= Electricity policy of Ontario =

Policy

The electricity policy of Ontario refers to plans, legislation, incentives, guidelines, and policy processes put in place by the Government of the Province of Ontario, Canada, to address issues of electricity production, distribution, and consumption. Policymaking in the electricity sector involves economic, social, and environmental considerations. Ontario's electricity supply outlook is projected to deteriorate in the near future due to increasing demand, aging electricity supply infrastructure, and political commitments, particularly the phase-out of coal-fired generation. Policymakers are presented with a range of policy choices in addressing the situation, both in terms of overall system design and structure, and specific electricity generating technologies.

Ontario finds itself faced with choices that define energy policy debates throughout the western world: the role of markets vs. centralized planning and what Amory Lovins has termed "hard" versus "soft energy paths"; i.e. continued reliance on large, centralized generation, particularly nuclear and coal, or moving towards decentralized technologies, including energy efficiency and low impact renewables.

As of December 2021 the capacity of 18,958 MW is divided up as 30.5% Nuclear, 39.5% Hydro-electric, 1% Biomass, 0.25% Solar, 25.5% Gas.(remainder unspecified). Coal use was phased out in 2014 (1st jurisdiction in North America).

== History of electricity demand planning in Ontario ==
=== Early history ===
In 1925, Ontario's public electricity utility, established in 1906, the Ontario Hydro Electric Commission (HEC) (later Ontario Hydro) constructed what was then the world's largest hydroelectric plant, Queenston-Chippawa (now Beck 1). From this early beginning until the postwar economic boom of the 1950s, Ontario Hydro was able to meet growing demand for electricity by expanding its network of hydraulic generating facilities. Planning for Ontario's electricity system was relatively simple for two reasons: 1) electricity was coming almost entirely from hydroelectric power; and 2) the electricity system consisted of several smaller systems, making management considerably easier.

Challenges to the system began to emerge in the 1950s: the accessible waterpower sites were exploited; and the province's electricity distribution system was limited in capacity. To address these problems, the HEC began constructing new coal-fired electricity generation plants near major sources of electricity demand and launched plans to build nuclear power plants across the province of Ontario. Between the early 1970s and early 1990s twenty CANDU power reactors were brought into service at the Pickering (8 reactors), Bruce (8 reactors) and Darlington (4 reactors) nuclear generating facilities.

=== Electricity demand planning 1970s–1990s ===
The Power Corporation Act required Ontario Hydro, (formerly HEPCO, renamed in 1974) to provide "power at cost". This philosophy became part of the culture and lore of electricity supply in Ontario. The utility did not pay taxes, nor was it intended to generate profits.

==== Porter Commission ====
Amid growing concern over the cost of nuclear power, coupled with inflation and recessions that reduced the demand for electricity, the Porter Commission (1975–1979) performed a detailed review on the problem of electricity supply. The Porter Commission's conclusions were simple: demand management, not supply planning, must be the focus of Ontario electricity planning.

==== Demand/Supply Plan (DSP) Report ====
It was not until 1989, however, that Ontario Hydro published its first Demand/Supply Plan (DSP) Report, "Providing the Balance of Power". The plan projected a supply/demand gap would open up in the mid-1990s, reaching 9,700 MW by 2005 and 21,300 MW by 2014. To address this gap, Ontario Hydro proposed building several additional nuclear and coal-fired generation plants. In 1992, Ontario Hydro issued a revised Supply/Demand Plan Report. As a public body, all Ontario Hydro projects, including the DSP, were subject to the province's Environmental Assessment Act. By 1993, however, faced with increasing criticism from the province's independent, quasi-judicial Environmental Assessment Board, a recession and economic restructuring that dramatically reduced industrial electricity demand, and an oversupply of electricity as the Darlington nuclear power plant came into service, the DSP was withdrawn by Ontario Hydro and no additional generating facilities were built.

=== Ontario's short experiment with competitive retail markets ===
In the 1990s, Ontario Hydro's enormous debt from the building of the Darlington nuclear generating station became a major political issue. Ontario Hydro was becoming financially and operationally dysfunctional. The situation forced Ontario Hydro to dramatically reduce staff and transmission investments. Ontario Hydro also published a document called Hydro 21. This report suggested that electricity system in Ontario should be restructured in a more market oriented direction.

The political impetus for restructuring increased with the 1995 election of the Mike Harris government. In that year, Mike Harris commissioned the Macdonald Committee. The committee recommended the elimination of Ontario Hydro's monopoly on managing generation capacity and that the electricity market be opened up to competition. In response to the Macdonald Committee's recommendations, the Ontario government released "Direction for Change: Charting a Course for Competitive Electricity and Jobs in Ontario" in 1997, detailing the government's plans to open the market for electricity supply.

The competitive market did not actually open until May 2002. Participation in the retail market was voluntary, with customers having the option of entering into contracts or rates being set in the five-minute spot market. Retail consumers were also free to enter fixed-rate contracts. For those that opted out of the contract option, electricity rates passed through a smoothed spot market price. When the market opened in May, wholesale prices averaged 3.01 cents per kWh. For a number of reasons, however, including an especially hot summer, a reduction in domestic generating capacity, and an increasing reliance on a limited import capacity, prices began to rise sharply. In July, average wholesale price was 6.2 cents per kWh. Under surmounting pressure from consumers, the government adopted the Electricity Pricing, Conservation and Supply (EPCS) Act in December 2002. The legislation capped retail prices at 4.3 cents per kWh and Ontario Power Generation (the successor of Ontario Hydro's electricity generation division) was to provide customers with a rebate for 100% of all electricity charges above that mark, retroactive to the market opening and continuing until 1 May 2006. Transmission and distribution rates were also frozen at their existing levels and would remain unchanged until 1 May 2006. The net result was a complete cessation of new investment in generation capacity and a significant cutback in new investment in transmission and distribution.

==== Concerns regarding aging nuclear plants ====
In 1996, major questions arose regarding the status of Ontario's nuclear plants. The oldest of these plants built in the 1970s were aging and in the early 1990s reliability began to decline significantly. The situation drew the attention of the federal nuclear regulator, the Atomic Energy Control Board of Canada (AECB) (now Canadian Nuclear Safety Commission), and was acknowledged by Ontario Hydro. In 1996, the AECB judged the situation at Pickering A to be particularly critical and issued the plant a six-month operating license. The following year a review board of industry experts concluded that the operations of Ontario's nuclear plants were "below standard" and "minimally acceptable". The Ontario government responded by approving a Nuclear Asset Optimization Plan proposed by Ontario Hydro. The plan had three major objectives: 1) the closure of the seven oldest of the utility's 19 operational nuclear reactors for rehabilitation; 2) the redeployment of staff; and 3) the spending of between $5 and $8 billion to implement the plan. In order to replace the lost capacity by the reactor closures, Ontario Hydro relied on its five coal-fired generation facilities. The result was a doubling of greenhouse gas emissions, smog, and acid rain precursors from these facilities between 1997 and 2001. This development occurred at a time when poor air quality was already a growing public health concern in southern Ontario. In response to the concerns of the public health impacts of increased coal-fired generation, all three major provincial political parties included a coal-phase out plan in their 2003 election platforms. The winner of the election, the Ontario Liberal Party, led by Dalton McGuinty, had committed to a phase-out by 2007.

==== Electricity Conservation and Supply Task Force ====
The August 2003 blackout in eastern North America reinforced concerns over the future of electricity supply in Ontario. In response an Electricity Conservation and Supply Task Force (ECSTF) was formed, submitting its recommendation in January 2004. The task force concluded that "the market approach adopted in the late 1990s needs substantial enhancement if it is to deliver the new generation and conservation Ontario needs, within the timeframes we need them". The task force also suggested that a long-term plan for generation and conservation was needed.

==== Creation of Ontario Power Authority ====
Following the recommendations of the ECSTF, the new provincial government, elected in October 2003, enacted the Ontario Electricity Restructuring Act. The legislation provided for the creation of the Ontario Power Authority (OPA). One of the four mandates of the OPA was to address the power system planning issues.

=== Green Energy Act ===
Ontario's Green Energy Act (GEA), and related amendments to other legislation, received Royal Assent on 14 May 2009. Regulations and other tools needed to fully implement the legislation were introduced through the month of September 2009, as part of a ten step plan to bring the GEA to life. The GEA will attempt to expedite the growth of clean, renewable sources of energy, like wind, solar, hydro, biomass and biogas, with the ambition to make Ontario become North America's leader in renewable energy. Specifically this would be attempted by creating a Feed-in Tariff that guarantees specific rates for energy generated from renewable sources, establishing the right to connect to the electricity grid for renewable energy projects that meet technical, economic and other regulatory requirements, establishing a one stop streamlined approvals process, providing service guarantees for renewable energy projects that meet regulatory requirements, and hopefully implementing a 21st-century "smart" power grid to support the development of new renewable energy projects, which may prepare Ontario for new technologies like electric cars.

On 1 January 2019, Ontario repealed the Green Energy Act.

== Integrated Power System Plan (IPSP) ==
2006 Existing Installed Generation Capacity.
	Capacity (MW)	No. of Stations	% of Total Capacity
Nuclear	11,419	5	36.6
Hydroelectric	7,768	68	24.9
Coal	6,434	4	20.6
Oil/Gas	5,103	22	16.4
Wind	395	4	1.3
Biomass/Landfill Gas	70	4	0.2
TOTAL	31,189	107	100

Over the next 20 years, it is expected that approximately 80% of the province of Ontario's existing electricity generation capacity will need to be replaced. In May 2005 the Minister of Energy, Dwight Duncan, asked the OPA to provide recommendations on what would be the appropriate mix of electricity supply sources to satisfy the expected demand in 2025, taking into account conservation targets and new sources of renewable energy.

Ontario faced three major electricity challenges: 1) the phasing-out of coal as a generation capacity source by 2007; 2) the impending end-of-life shutdown of nuclear generation capacity from 2009 to 2025; and 3) the steady increase of summer peak-demand in normal weather patterns.

=== IPSP evaluation and development process ===
In December 2005, the OPA issued the Supply Mix Advice Report in response to the Minister's request. The report's principal recommendation was the retention of a major role for nuclear power in Ontario, with the implication of the refurbishment of existing facilities and even new build plants, while coal generating capacity would be replaced with renewable energy sources (principally wind) and gas-fired generation. The proposal's failure to incorporate significant improvements in the province's overall energy efficiency and continued heavy reliance nuclear power was the subject of widespread criticism from the province's environmental movement, and members of the public who participated in consultations on the OPA's report.

On 13 June 2006 Dwight Duncan, Ontario's Minister of Energy, issued a directive for the preparation of a 20-year integrated power system plan for the province. The Minister's directive included minimum goals for conservation (increased substantially from the Supply Mix Advice report) and renewable energy, and a maximum limit for nuclear power production at approximately the capacity of the existing 20 reactors. Since then, the OPA has published eight discussion papers, as well as a preliminary version of the IPSP. It is expected that the OPA will submit the IPSP to the Ontario Energy Board (OEB), a regulatory body who will review and then either accept or reject the plan based on whether or not it complies with the Minister's directives and the IPSP regulations, and whether or not it is prudent and cost effective. If the OEB does not approve the IPSP based on these evaluation criteria, then the IPSP is sent back to the OPA for revision. If the OEB approves the plan, then the OPA will put the IPSP into effect.

On the same day (13 June 2006) that the Ministry of Energy issued its directive, the Government of Ontario passed a regulation exempting the IPSP from being subject to an environmental assessment (EA) under the Ontario Environmental Assessment Act. This has been met with opposition from environmental groups, who argue that an EA of the IPSP is the "best way for Ontarians to understand the risks and costs of the government's electricity plan".

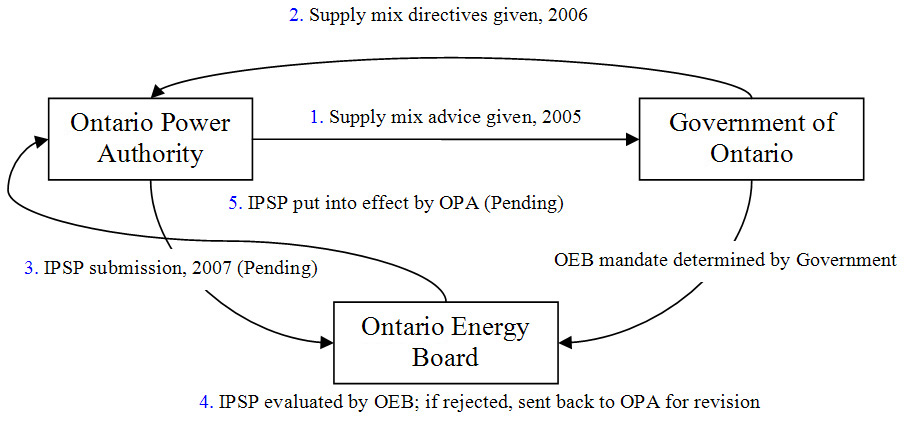
Existing Policy Process.

=== Existing environmental policy process ===
Instead of an environmental assessment of the plan, as had been the case 1989 DSP, a regulation made under the Electricity Act, 1998, the OPA was instructed to "[e]nsure that safety, environmental protection and environmental sustainability are considered" in the development of the Integrated Power System Plan (IPSP). The OPA's approach to sustainability is outlined in IPSP Discussion Paper #6: Sustainability.

The OPA defines sustainable development according to the definition agreed upon by the World Commission on Environment and Development's 1983 report, Our Common Future : "Sustainable development is development that meets the needs of the present without compromising the ability of future generations to meet their own needs."

The OPA states that it has based its consideration of sustainability in the IPSP on Robert B. Gibson's Sustainability Assessment: Criteria and Processes. Six context-specific criteria were identified by the OPA: feasibility, reliability, cost, flexibility, environmental performance, and societal acceptance.

The OPA's approach has been criticized for a number of reasons. The OPA's discussion paper on sustainability was published both after the supply mix advice was given to the Ontario Government and after the supply mix directives were given to the OPA by Ontario's Minister of Energy. Also, several elements of Gibson's sustainability assessment framework were not implemented or discussed in Discussion Paper #6: Sustainability.

The IPSP regulation mandates that the OPA consider environmental sustainability in the IPSP. The OEB, the body responsible for evaluating the IPSP, defines "consider" as meaning "weighed and evaluated". Thus, the OPA is only liable for evaluating the sustainability of the IPSP rather than for the incorporation of sustainability into the IPSP.

== Central planning and traditional regulation versus competitive markets ==
Although the provincial government officially describes the system it has established as a 'hybrid' of planning and market models, debates on the merits of a centrally planned system versus a competitive market approach persist.

=== Central planning and traditional regulation ===
Central or traditional electricity planning is designed to expand supply resources to meet demand growth and to minimize the economic costs of this expansion by improving economies of scale in electricity generation. Economies of scale exist for a vertically integrated electric utility because a larger generating system can provide power to many users, and additional users can be accommodated with small increases in power costs.

Centrally planned systems are usually accompanied by a regulatory framework intended to restrict or replace competition with administrative restraints on profits. In Ontario, electricity rates were typically set by Ontario Hydro as an approximation to its long-run average cost of service, plus a mark up to recover capital investment costs, although rates were never subject to formal approval by the Ontario Energy Board.

Howard Hampton, former leader of the Ontario New Democratic Party, argues that this averaging out of the cost of power ensures supply meets demand in a cost-effective manner. For example, to ensure overall system reliability, a considerable portion of generation capacity from peaking plants must remain idle most of the time. Operating costs for peaking plants, however, are usually expensive because they inefficiently convert costly fossil fuels to electricity.

In Ontario's public monopoly system, costs were averaged out between base load and peaking stations. In other words, the insurance cost of reliability is spread out and shared equitably by all customers. Under a deregulated system, in which each generating station "must stand on its own two financial feet", the cost of ensuring such reliability would be considerably higher, as peaking plants would charge as much as the market will bear, as they are rationally expected to do.

Those who defend the combination of traditional regulation and central planning for the electricity sector, like Hampton, often base their arguments on the basic premise that electricity is an essential good required for consumer well-being. According to Hampton, central planning and regulation are required to ensure reliability in both the supply and delivery and the generation and infrastructure aspects. Whereas planning under a market regime is profit-driven, central planning can ensure that Ontario's best interests are being attended to and not just the interests of private investors. Stephan Schott, for example, has stated that, at least theoretically, state ownership of the electricity sector could satisfy all of the criteria for socially efficient and environmentally sustainable electricity production. This includes fully internalizing external social costs of electricity production and pricing electricity according to demand fluctuations, even while maintaining stable supply.

Central planning, however, is not without limitations. Central planning has the disadvantage of the risk of political interference. The tendency for governments has been to avoid creating policies that could make electricity consumption more expensive or that would require citizen to adjust their consumption habits. Furthermore, central planning, which seeks to improve economies of scale, has historically "led to a nearly universal strategy of rapid capacity expansion and promotion of demand growth, with little consideration of the necessity or efficiency of energy use". This is true of Ontario Hydro, which, faced with the threat of cheap natural gas in the late 1950s, made the ill-fated decision to protect its market share by encouraging consumers to use more electricity. Ontario Hydro was forced to build new, more expensive generating plants and transmission and distribution infrastructure to keep up with demand.

Although signs were present by the early 1970s indicating that consumer demand growth was falling, Wayne Skene argues that "Ontario Hydro's board and management had remained locked in megaproject mode, persisting in the belief that demand would continue to double every decade". Therefore, simply in terms of scale of operations, it can be argued that central planning in Ontario, by overestimating future demand and building unnecessary capacity, has been economically inefficient and has imposed unwarranted costs upon the environment.

=== Deregulation and competitive markets ===
Proponents of deregulation and restructuring of the electricity sector used these limitations to strengthen their case, arguing that such flaws are typical of regulated/centrally planned systems. Ronald Daniels and Michael Trebilcock, for example, argue that a premium should be placed on incrementalism and decentralization in terms of decision-making, rather than planning for "some once-and-for-all, system-wide set of collective decisions as to the future of the [electricity] industry". Moreover, they argue that competitive markets have the added advantage of being able to rely on the knowledge and expertise possessed by investors to generate a more rational assessment of the alleged merits of a given project.

Deregulation would ensure that rates would no longer be based on long-term average costs, as determined by a central regulating entity, to pricing based on short-term marginal costs. A plant's marginal cost varies considerably based on age, technology, fuel conversion efficiency, and so on. Both regulated and deregulated systems operate to minimize the avoidable costs of meeting instantaneous demand.

As demand is communicated to a power system dispatcher, this least-cost operating principle requires the dispatcher to first employ plants with the lowest marginal costs. In other words, rates in a deregulated system are "determined by hungry competitors contending for the last megawatt of demand in a market that clears every five minutes". Eliminating average cost of service rates creates the need for a market to determine electricity rates.

The term restructuring generally refers to the creation of these markets and the disintegration of vertically integrated utilities. The theoretical gains from restructuring are numerous. Competition, coupled with freeing electricity generators from cost of service rates, ought to give generators powerful incentives to cut costs, which will lower consumer prices in the long-term. In other words, deregulation is said to subject the electricity sector to the "innovative and productive forces of competition".

Competition would require generating facilities to assume a much tougher stance in negotiating contracts for fuel sources, labour, and maintenance. It would also require utilities to focus on innovation to increase technological efficiency in order to remain competitive. In addition, Timothy Considine and Andrew Kleit argue that competition would improve the efficiency of allocating electricity.

As Don Dewees explains, investors in a competitive market will build new capacity when they expect to recover "all capital and operating costs from the expected markets price. If market prices will not cover the cost of the investment, that investment is socially excessive". In theory, this particular aspect of deregulation should correct the systemic over-expansionary tendencies of centrally planned regimes.

However, competitive markets are not without limitations. Basic economic theory dictates that for competition to exist, a large number of market participants are required. Experience with deregulation in the United States and the United Kingdom, however, has shown that competitive markets can lead to market power concentration and market manipulation. In these jurisdictions, the market has been threatened by the strategic behaviour of incumbents and new entrants that have too large a market share. The case of Enron in California is a prime example. For a competitive market to function, firms cannot significantly influence prices by adjusting or shutting down supply individually.

Furthermore, the promise of competitive markets to lower consumer prices, for the most part, has yet to materialize. Data from the United States, for example, indicates that while Pennsylvania and Connecticut have fairly stable residential prices since restructuring, most other states have witnessed price increases after the year 2000. While this may be good news in terms of conservation and demand-side management (C&DM) objectives, it has made competitive markets unpopular among consumers and politically troublesome. For example, as consumer prices rose during Ontario's experiment with deregulation, Premier Ernie Eves, under surmounting political pressure, intervened into the market by freezing retail prices in November 2002.

This is because electricity is different from all other products in that it must be produced and distributed at the exact moment that it is consumed, and in that it is essential for the functioning of a modern, industrial nation. Thus a market in electricity does not respond in the same way as the market for products which can be stored, whose purchase can be deferred, or which are not essential. Naing Win Oo and V. Miranda used intelligent agent simulation to show that in moving from a vertically integrated to a competitive electricity market, retail consumers were heavily disadvantaged and suppliers used this to steadily increase both prices and profits. This occurred even with a large number of suppliers, and in the absence of any active collusion between them. However, in practice collusion and exploitative behavior by suppliers have been found in real markets when they have been deregulated. S. David Freeman, who was appointed Chair of the California Power Authority in the midst of the power crisis in that state, testified on Enron's role in creating the crisis to the Subcommittee on Consumer Affairs, Foreign Commerce and Tourism of the Senate Committee on Commerce, Science and Transportation on 15 May 2002:

There is one fundamental lesson we must learn from this experience: electricity is really different from everything else. It cannot be stored, it cannot be seen, and we cannot do without it, which makes opportunities to take advantage of a deregulated market endless. It is a public good that must be protected from private abuse. If Murphy's Law were written for a market approach to electricity, then the law would state 'any system that can be gamed, will be gamed, and at the worst possible time.' And a market approach for electricity is inherently gameable. Never again can we allow private interests to create artificial or even real shortages and to be in control.

Market manipulation for private profit thus creates government intervention into the marketplace. This intervention, although certainly supported by electricity consumers, creates doubt in the minds of potential investors, who then begin to question the government's commitment to restructuring. An unattractive environment for private investors, in turn, threatens overall supply in a competitive market regime, as planning for and building new generating capacity becomes an increasing risk. This is why some supporters of restructuring, like Dewees, admit "[t]he greatest risk to competitive markets may not be power shortages or heat waves but government intervention ..."

== Conservation and demand management ==
Electricity use can be divided into three main sectors:

- Residential sector: this includes residential space and water heating and cooling, lighting, household appliances, etc. Electricity use in this sector accounts for about one third of total consumption in Ontario. Residential demand is projected to decline slightly.
- Commercial sector: this includes mainly space heating, and cooling, as well as commercial and office lighting. This sector accounts for about 39% of Ontario's total electricity consumption and is projected to grow the most.
- Industrial sector: this includes manufacturing activities, mining activities, forestry and construction. Industrial consumers account for approximately 28% of electricity consumed in Ontario. This consumption is projected to remain stable.

Electricity demand can also be separated as base load and peak demand. Base load refers to constant, or unvarying, demand for electricity. In Ontario, base load amounts to approximately 13,000 MW and is met by nuclear and hydroelectric power. These supply options generally have low operating costs. Nuclear stations are limited in their capability to rapidly change their output. Hydroelectric stations can rapidly change their output and are typically used to adjust grid supply to match instantaneous demand.

Peak demand refers to fluctuating, or varying, needs for electricity above and beyond base load levels. Added to this base load, the peak load raises Ontario's maximum electricity demand to 27,000 MW. This peak is typically met by oil/natural gas-fired, coal and select hydro-electric power plants. These plants can respond to changes in demand rapidly, but have higher operating costs.

Average demand in Ontario is currently 17,500 MW.

Electricity demand is greatly affected by seasonal variations. A recent trend has developed whereby summer peak demand has grown to outpace winter peak loads. This is primarily the result of increasingly warm summer conditions. The highest load recorded in Ontario occurred on 1 August 2006, when peak demand for electricity reached 27,005 MW. The highest winter peak demand occurred 13 February 2007, when peak demand was 25,868 MW.

Peak demand also varies by the time of day. The daily peak period refers to the time of the day when demand is at its high. In winter, there are generally two peaking periods: around 10:30 a.m. and around 6 p.m.. In summer months, demand peaks in the late afternoon, when temperatures are at their hottest.

=== Current and expected future electricity demand ===
Current annual electricity demand in Ontario is 151 TWh. In other words, on average, Ontarians consume 12,750 kWh per person per year. Based on 2003 information, this figure is approximately 25% lower than the Canadian average, roughly equal to U.S. rates, and about twice as high as European consumption levels (see: electricity consumption by country). In order to supply such demand, Ontario counts on 31,000 MW of installed power capacity, broken down as follows: 37% nuclear, 26% renewable (including hydro-electric power), 16% natural gas and 21% coal.

Total electricity demand has been increasing in Ontario over the last decades. In particular, during the period 1993–2004, it increased at a rate of approximately 0.5%.

Several factors affect how much energy is consumed by Ontarians. These include:

- Population growth: According to 2006 census data, Ontario's population has increased 6.6% in the past 5 years. This considerable growth offsets the effects of reduced per capita consumption in Ontario, and results in overall increased electricity consumption.
- Economic growth: Ontario's GDP growth has varied between 2% and 3% in recent years, and is expected to average 3.0% over the next few years. Although electricity per unit of GDP has been falling in the past few years, the total rate of economic growth will result in increased overall demand. This overall increase, however, is significantly smaller than the rate of economic or population growth, showing that electricity demand is decoupled from these two growth rates, a pattern that is recently being replicated in other areas of Canada and other G7 countries.
- Climate variability: Given that a large part of electricity consumption is related to space and water heating and cooling, the increasing variability of temperatures in Ontario will likely result in greater electricity demand over time.
- Industrial activity: Heavy industry (mining, pulp and paper, auto manufacturing, etc.) consumes more energy than service- and knowledge-related economic sectors. However, structural changes are occurring in the province's economy, particularly the decline of heavy manufacturing and increase in service and knowledge sectors, which will result in reduced industrial electricity demand overall.
- Electricity prices: As of Sept 10, 2016, Electricity rates in Ontario are among the highest in North America.
- Conservation and Demand Management (C&DM) practices: C&DM initiatives can significantly reduce electricity demand. Conservation can result in improved productivity, lower energy bills and price fluctuations, as well reduced environmental impacts.

All of the above variables affect the forecasting of future electricity demand. The uncertainty embedded in these factors accumulates and makes it difficult to determine how much electricity will be consumed in the future.

In its 2005 Supply Mix Advice Report, the OPA estimated that electricity demand will grow at a rate of 0.9% annually between 2006 and 2025, rising to approximately 170 TWh per year by 2025. This OPA estimate is nearly double the actual rate of electricity demand growth between 1990 and 2003 of 0.5% per year. In fact, the rate of growth in electricity demand in Ontario has been in decline since 1950. This was a result of the structural changes in the Ontario economy over this period, particularly the decline of heavy manufacturing and increased growth in the service and knowledge sectors.

The OPA projections are controversial. Organizations like Pollution Probe, the Pembina Institute, and the Ontario Clean Air Alliance claim that the OPA Supply Mix is fundamentally supply oriented and overestimates future electricity demand. They base their claims on several reports that estimate lower demand projections.

=== Conservation and demand-side management initiatives in Ontario ===
Demand-Side Management (DSM) consists of the implementation of different policies and measures that serve to influence the demand for a product. When talking about electricity, it is often referred to as Conservation and Demand Management (C&DM or CDM), as it aims to reduce electricity demand, either by using more efficient technologies or by changing wasteful habits. C&DM also addresses reductions in peak demand via Demand Response (DR) programs. Demand Response does not lower total electricity demand; rather, it shifts demand out of the peak times.

Economically rational and technically feasible conservation is considered by some to be the cheapest, cleanest way to bridge the gap between supply and demand. For example, load reductions are vital in achieving the goal of shutting down Ontario's coal plants and in avoiding imports of US coal-fired power, which entails important health and environmental benefits. Moreover, the implementation of aggressive C&DM mechanisms would lower consumers' bills while increasing the province's energy productivity. Ontario's economy currently reflects relatively low electricity productivity levels, measured as GDP per electricity use. The state of New York has an electricity productivity rate that is 2.3 times higher than that of Ontario. C&DM programs are also advantageous in that they can be implemented within limited time horizons and budgets relative to the huge lead times and financial risks involved in the installation of new generation plants.

Energy efficiency models can be used to estimate energy efficiency potential to determine and prioritize effective conservation policies.

Based on their estimates of future demand, the OPA has recommended 1,820 MW as a target for peak demand reduction to be achieved by 2025. After consultation with stakeholder groups who deemed this target too low, Ontario's C&DM goals were eventually adjusted to reflect a new target of 6,300 MW of conservation by 2025 (1,350 MW by 2007, an extra 1,350 MW by 2010, and an additional 3,600 MW by 2025). This target was set by Ministry of Energy's supply mix directive, which provides direction for preparation of Integrated Power System Plan (IPSP) for Ontario Power Authority. This target was based on "economically prudent" and "cost effective" conservation and renewables, and by setting a lower priority for both options in comparison to nuclear.

Based on models and estimation by several Ontario's energy consultant companies and independent agencies, Ontario has a saving potential of almost twice the Ontario's target for energy efficiency. The gap between the Ontario's potential savings and its current target could be the result of: a) inadequate coordination between the Ontario government and OPA; b) lack of public information regarding incentives and energy efficient measures; c) insufficient long-term energy efficiency planning and funding; and e) lack of good institutional, delivery and market transformation. The largest potential for energy savings in Ontario has been identified in lighting, space heating, air conditioning, manufacturing machinery, and commercial equipment. According to an assessment commissioned by the OPA, this potential applies to all three electricity sectors:

- The residential sector accounted for one-third of energy use in Ontario. The OPA assessment suggests that there is a potential electricity savings of 31% in Ontario's residential sector by 2015 via lighting and space heating upgrades.
- The commercial sector accounts for 39% of Ontario's total electricity consumption. The OPA assessment reports a potential savings of 33% in this sector mainly in interior lighting and cooling retrofits.
- The industrial sector, which includes all manufacturing activities, mining, forestry and construction, accounts for approximately 28% of electricity use in Ontario. Based on the OPA assessment, a 36% energy savings is possible in this sector based on investments in new heating, ventilation, and air conditioning equipment.

=== Government actors involved in conservation and demand management ===
The Ontario Conservation Bureau is a governmental organization established by the Ontario government as a division of OPA in 2005. Its mandate is to promote C&DM programs that defer the need to invest in new generation and transmission infrastructure. Programs managed by the Conservation Bureau include:

- Low income and social housing initiatives designed to reduce electricity consumption by a total of 100 MW in 33,000 homes.
- Savings rebates which encourage Ontario residents to reduce their electricity use by installing energy efficient cooling and heating equipment.
- Demand response programs that offer consumers compensation for curtailing their electricity demand during specific times of day.

The Ontario Ministry of Energy (MOE) is responsible for ensuring that Ontario's electricity system functions at the highest level of reliability and productivity. This includes establishing energy efficiency standards, including Energy Star standards for appliances and windows. The Ministry has recently begun a program to remove T12 (tubular 1.5 inch fluorescent) commercial lamps by 2011.

The Ontario Ministry of Municipal Affairs and Housing has begun encouraging private sector housing developers to increase the energy efficiency standards of new homes. Other programs include:

- A three-year review of Ontario's building code to upgrade the energy efficiency performance of Ontario buildings.
- Financial incentives (in the form of rebates) for energy efficiency in affordable housing units.
- Implementation of ecoENERGY building standards beginning in 2007 (the official Government of Canada mark associated with the labelling and rating of the energy consumption or energy efficiency of specific products)

The Office of Energy Efficiency (OEE) was established in April 1998 as part of Natural Resources Canada and is the primary federal office for energy efficiency. OEE responsibilities include: the promotion of energy efficiency in major energy sectors (industrial, residential, commercial, and building); the provision of energy efficiency information to the public; the collection of data and publication of energy efficiency trends.

Since 2005, the Ontario Energy Board (OEB) put into place two mechanisms to create incentives for local distribution companies (LDCs) to promote C&DM program: a Lost Revenue Adjustment Mechanism (LRAM), by which utilities recover all of the revenues that they would have collected had they not promoted sales reductions through conservation and energy efficiency; and a Shared Savings Mechanism (SSM), by which consumers and utilities share the benefits associated with the implementation of C&DM program.

Since 2009, the Environmental Commissioner of Ontario (ECO) has had the statutory responsibility to report on "the progress of activities in Ontario to reduce the use or make more efficient use of electricity, natural gas, propane, oil and transportation fuels." The ECO produces two-part annual reports on energy conservation, the first part on the broader policy framework affecting energy conservation in Ontario, and the second part on the results of initiatives underway.

== Supply options ==
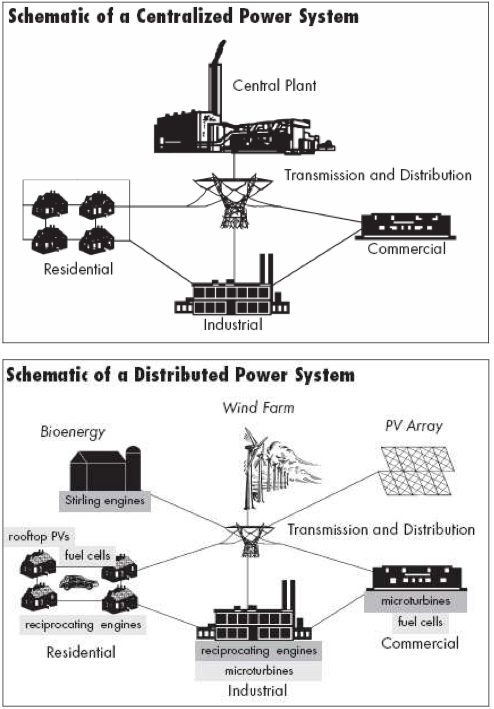
Schematics of Centralized versus Distributed Systems

Electricity supplies can be classified as either distributed or centralized in nature. Whereas conventional, centralized generation involves few generation facilities connected via high-voltage transmission lines spanning long distances, distributed generation facilities are located close to the load—or in technical speak, on the customer side of the meter—although not necessarily restricted to local uses. In this scheme, distributed energy sources are more numerous and sufficiently smaller than central generating plants so as to allow interconnection at nearly any point in the electricity system.

Distributed generation—sometimes known as 'dispersed' or 'embedded' generation when referring to small-scale wind generation—generally describes only renewable electricity sources with capacities less than 10 MW. Technologies often associated with distributed generation include cogeneration—also known as combined heat and power (CHP) generation—as well as micro-turbines, fuel cells, and gas generators used for on-site or emergency backup power.

Renewables can also be considered distributed technologies, depending on their application. Typically, community wind farms, solar photovoltaic arrays, geothermal installations, and biomass-fuelled power facilities are typically sufficiently limited in their generation capacity that they qualify as distributed energy sources. Conversely, large hydropower plants and offshore wind parks, with substantial production capacities of 50–100 MW or more which feed into high-voltage transmission grids, cannot be considered distributed generation.

=== Coal ===
Coal-fired electricity generation is currently inexpensive relative to other energy sources. In 2005, the average price of coal power in Ontario was C$46/MWh, compared to $89/MWh and $107/MWh for hydropower and oil/natural gas generation, respectively. However, coal is believed to cost 3 billion in additional health costs to Ontario every year, accounting for this, it is twice as expensive as wind.

Ontario's coal plants emit large quantities of greenhouse gases and smog-causing pollutants each year. The Ontario Clean Air Alliance is perhaps the loudest critic of coal-fired generation in this regard. The latest figures, from 2005, reported in the Canadian Government's National Pollutant Release Inventory and the Greenhouse Gas Emissions Reporting Program, show that the Nanticoke Generating Station is the single largest emitter of greenhouse gases (CO_{2}) (17,629,437 tonnes) and fifth largest emitter of air pollutants (107,689,470 kg) in Canada. Nevertheless, thanks in part to acid rain controls implemented in the 1980s and 1990s, coal emissions have been dropping. In total, Ontario's coal plants emitted 14% (37,000 tonnes) of all NO_{x}, 28% (154,000 tonnes) of all SO_{2}, and 20% (495 kg) of all Hg (mercury) emissions in 2003, respectively.

A cost-benefit analysis released by the provincial government in April 2005, found that emissions from all Ontario coal-fired stations are responsible for up to 668 premature deaths, 928 hospital admissions, 1,100 emergency room visits, and 333,600 minor illness (headaches, coughing, respiratory symptoms) per year.

New 'clean coal' technologies—such as Flue Gas Desulphurization (FGD) "scrubbers" for SO_{2} removal and Selective Catalytic Reduction (SCR) for NO_{X}—can be used to reduce toxic releases, but have no effect on carbon emissions and are expensive to install. Testifying before a legislative committee in February 2007, Jim Hankinson, chief executive of Ontario Power Generation, estimated the cost of installing new scrubbers on Ontario's coal plants between C$500 million and C$1.5 billion.

As of 2007, two of the four smokestacks at Lambton and two of eight stacks at the Nanticoke station are currently equipped with scrubbers. The OPA is expected to recommend whether or not to install scrubbers at remaining coal facilities in Spring 2007.

In 2007, coal-fired power plants made up about 21% of Ontario's existing energy supply (6,434 MW) and 19% of total Ontario electricity production (30.9 TWh). at the time, Ontario had four coal-fired power plants in operation:

- Thunder Bay Generating Station (no longer producing coal since April 2014)
  - Location: Thunder Bay, Ontario
  - Total Capacity: 2 units, 310 MW
- Atikokan Generating Station (no longer producing coal since late 2012)
  - Location: Atikokan, Ontario, between Thunder Bay and Kenora
  - Total Capacity: 1 unit, 215 MW
- Lambton Generating Station (no longer producing coal since late 2013)
  - Location: Corunna (south of Sarnia)
  - Total Capacity: 4 units, 1,975 MW
- Nanticoke Generating Station (no longer producing coal since December 2013)
  - Location: Haldimand County (near Port Dover)
  - Total Capacity: 8 units, 3,938 MW

In April 2005, the government of Ontario closed the Lakeview Generating Station in Mississauga, Ontario, representing 1,140 MW of generating capacity.

The Ontario Liberals came to power in 2003 promising to phase-out and replace all of the province's coal stations by 2007. In 2005, the Government pushed back the target date to 2009, citing reliability concerns. It has since revised this plan once more, maintaining its political commitment, but refusing to set a specific deadline for a complete phase-out. Instead, it instructed the OPA to: "Plan for coal-fired generation in Ontario be replaced by cleaner sources in the earliest practical time frame that ensures adequate generating capacity and electric system reliability in Ontario." [Emphasis added]

The OPA has subsequently published preliminary plans for a complete coal phase-out by 2014, to begin in 2011. Coal generators are expected to be replaced by new renewable energy and natural gas generation facilities, as well as conservation measures. Thunder Bay Generating Station, the last coal-fired electricity plant in Ontario was shut down in April 2014, completing the phase-out. The plant has since been restored to service fueled by biomass.

=== Natural gas ===
Natural gas is a fossil fuel composed mainly of methane, which can be burned to release heat that is then used to produce electricity. It contains very little sulphur, no ash and almost no metals; therefore, unlike with coal, heavy metal and SO_{x} (sulphur dioxide and sulphur trioxide) pollution is not a major concern. In the United States the average natural gas-fired plant emits 516 kg of carbon dioxide, 0.05 kg of sulfur dioxide and 0.8 kg of nitrogen oxides (NO_{x}) per megawatt-hour of energy generated. Compared with coal, natural gas generates about half as much carbon dioxide, one-third of the nitrogen oxides, and one one-hundredth of the sulfur oxides.

Natural gas is most commonly used for heating applications in homes and businesses but natural gas-fired power generation is also a significant component of the power supply mix, accounting for 8% of Ontario's power generation capacity, with 102 natural gas generating stations. This capacity is set to increase from 5,103 MW to 9,300 MW by 2010.

In 2006, the Ontario government directed the OPA to use natural gas to meet peak time energy demand. The OPA was also instructed to develop high efficiency and value use options for natural gas. The OPA has therefore decided to use natural gas for two applications: (1) local area reliability and (2) system capacity.

By 2025, installed natural gas and cogeneration capacity is targeted to increase from the current 4,976 MW to 11,000 MW—roughly 27% of system generation capacity. That said, due to its predominant use only in high-value energy applications, natural gas is only expected to account for 6% of Ontario's overall electricity production.

=== Cogeneration ===
Cogeneration, or combined heat and power (CHP), refers to the concurrent generation of power and heat from the same energy source. The heat is then used in local applications such as heating homes.

Cogeneration can be applied to any fuel which is combusted for energy. Fossil fuels, biomass and biogas can all be used in CHP plants. Transporting heat over long distances is impractical, so cogeneration plants are usually small and located close to the energy load. Hence, cogeneration is inherently linked to distributed generation. The urban location of CHP plants makes them very compatible with clean-burning fuels such as natural gas. The health concerns associated with other fossil fuels (see coal above) make them less suitable for areas with high population densities.

Cogeneration can dramatically increase the efficiency of fuel use, as 48–64% of the energy from conventional combustion can be recovered as heat, while only 25–37% is converted into power. The combined efficiency of heat and power use can be up to 91%. High efficiencies translate into much lower fuel costs as well as much lower [greenhouse gas] and other emissions.

There are 110 CHP generating plants currently in operation in Ontario, with a total capacity of approximately 2,300 MW. Of these, 82 burn natural gas and the rest use biomass. Only 50 of these facilities are connected to the grid. (See: Simon Fraser's Cogeneration Database).

The Ontario Power Authority anticipates that the contribution of cogeneration to electricity conservation will be between 47 and 265 MW depending upon how aggressively it is pursued in Ontario. However, these projections are controversial, as there is still much debate about the real-life potential of widespread cogeneration projects.

A request for proposals was sent out by the OPA in 2005 for up to 1,000 MW of new cogeneration. As a result, seven new CHP generating stations are currently being developed in Ontario under contracts executed in 2006 with a combined total capacity of 414 MW.

=== Nuclear ===
Nuclear power accounts for almost half of Ontario's power generation. The government plans to maintain nuclear power's role in energy generation through to 2025. Ontario currently has 18 nuclear units in operation. These reactors amount to 11,400 MW of generation capacity and are located at three sites: Pickering, Bruce and Darlington. Approximately one half of Ontario's power was generated from nuclear energy sources in 2005.

The Canadian Energy Research Institute (CERI) prepared a report for the Canadian Nuclear Association in 2004 comparing environmental impacts of nuclear generation to other base load generation technologies in Ontario. They found nuclear power to be almost cost-comparable with coal generation. However, groups such as the Pembina Institute and the Ontario Clean Air Alliance criticize nuclear power because of the impact of uranium mining operations, the long-term effects of radioactive waste and the potential terrorism and disaster risks of nuclear energy.

As of December 2004 there were more than 1,700,000 used fuel bundles stored on-site at both operational and decommissioned nuclear generating stations around Ontario.

Nuclear facilities have long lead times for both environmental and other approvals, as well as actual construction. Ontario's nuclear history is also chequered with budget overruns and delays in new build and refurbished plants. Nuclear has high capital costs and lead times, but low operational costs, making it suitable only for base load applications. In comparison, natural gas plants have short lead times but high operational and fuel costs. However, recently a range of economic factors have had a major impact on the cost of nuclear power. Groups such as the Ontario Clean Air Alliance are quick to point out that fluctuations in uranium prices have made operational costs associated with nuclear generation rise higher than those of natural gas plants and renewables.

The OPA has been directed by the government to use nuclear energy to meet the base load of energy demand in Ontario, but that nuclear generation capacity should not exceed 14,000 MW. The result is that nuclear is projected to make up approximately 37% of generation capacity in Ontario and produce 50% of the power in 2025, similar to its role in the current supply mix.

To achieve this mix, more nuclear units will need to either be built or refurbished, as most of the reactors currently in service will exceed their useful lifetime before 2020. In response, the OPA has entered into an agreement with Bruce Power to refurbish two units at Bruce, which are anticipated to add 1,540 MW of generating capacity by 2009. Bruce Power also plans to refurbish a third unit in future. The Auditor General of Ontario released a report on 5 April 2007, criticizing the high costs associated with the Bruce Power refurbishment agreement.

Ontario Power Generation (OPG) is currently conducting an environmental assessment for refurbishment of four operational units at Pickering B.

=== Renewables ===
OPA projections for installed renewable electricity capacity in Ontario by 2025.
	2005 Installed capacity (MW)	New capacity (MW)	2025 Projected Total (MW)
Hydroelectric	7,768	2,287	10,055
Wind	305	4,719	5,019
Biomass	70	786	856

As a strategy to cut down greenhouse gas emissions, the Ontario government is planning to phase out coal-fired electricity generating plants and increase the proportion of electricity generated from renewable sources as well as promoting strategies to reduce electricity demand through CDM. It is estimated that 30% of Ontario electricity demand will be produced from these sources by 2025. Compared to fossil fuel sources, generating electricity from renewable sources such as water, wind, and biomass has the following advantages:

- Low environmental and health impacts due to reduced emissions of green house gases.
- Low operating costs leading to low heating and electricity costs.
- Low security and safety risks relative to conventional energy sources such as fossil fuels-fired or nuclear generations.
- Reduced dependency on imported fuels which create energy security.
- The distributed nature of renewables allows reduction of costs and losses of transmission and distribution of centrally generated power.

==== Hydroelectricity ====
Hydropower currently accounts for approximately 21% of the current electricity supply in Ontario. This capacity is estimated to rise to 30% by 2025 as new sites are added to the current installed capacity and the existing ones are refurbished. Particular emphasis will be placed on developing hydroelectric plants with large storage capacities that can be used to provide dispatchable energy, which are equally capable of meeting peak electricity demand or offsetting the intermittent nature of other renewable sources such as wind.

==== Wind ====
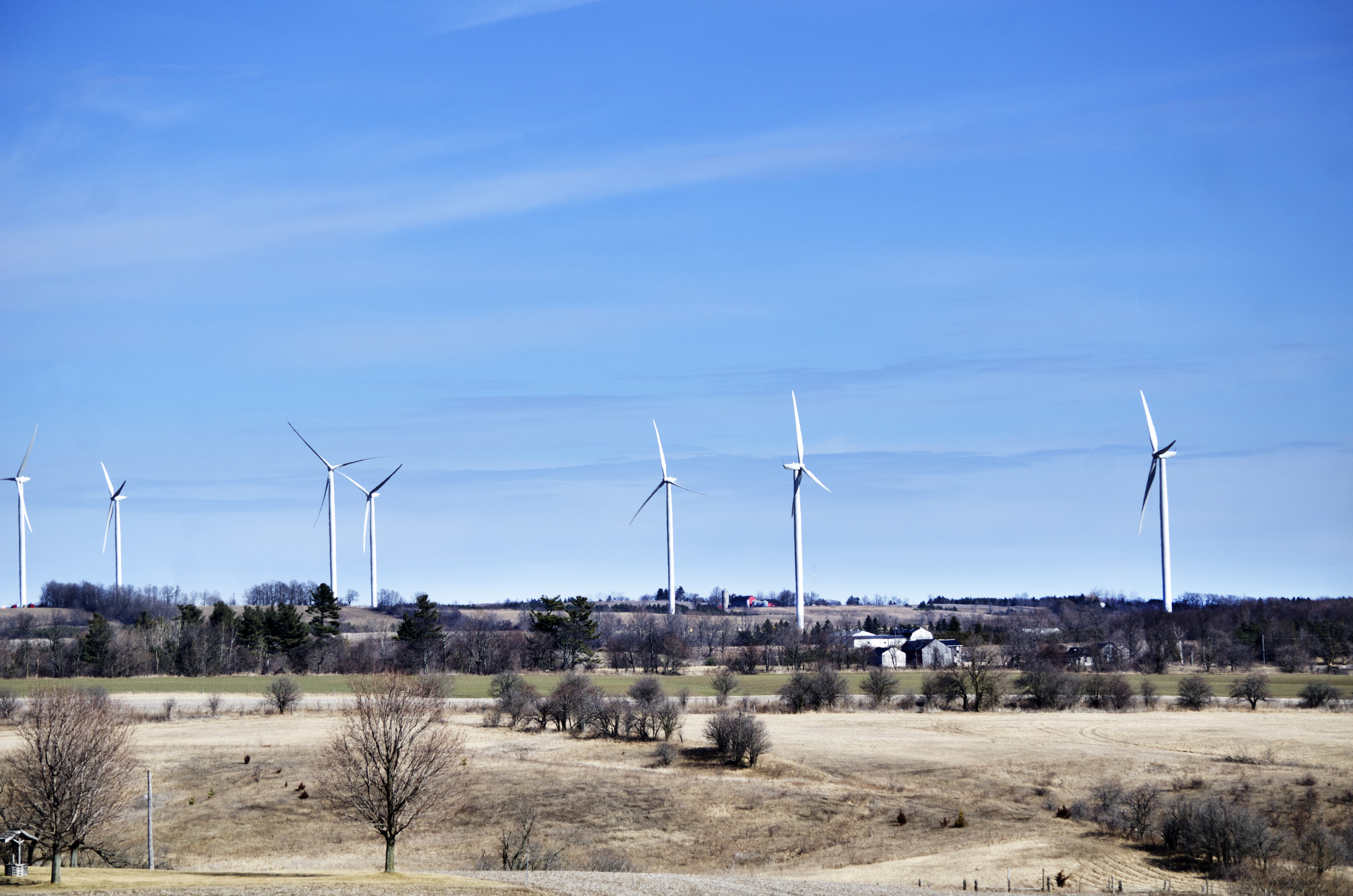
Ganaraska Wind Farm, located in Clarington, Ontario.

Ontario, especially the southern part, has abundant wind potential that can be harnessed to generate renewable electricity. It is estimated that Ontario has an area of about 300,000 km^{2} within the reach of the transmission system that can be used for generating electricity from wind energy. This area approximates the size of Germany, which is the leading country for producing electricity from wind energy. If Ontario could intensively use wind energy like Germany, wind-based electricity would contribute up to 13% of the province's demand. Generating electricity from wind energy is considered cost-effective in southern Ontario because of closeness to transmission lines and load centres.

Wind may be considered an unreliable source of electricity due to its intermittent nature. However, integrating wind energy with hydroelectric systems or biomass ensures stable renewable electricity supply. Integrations of wind and hydro have been successfully practiced in the state of Oregon and may be used to provide reliable electricity in Canada.

In 2015 Canada's installed wind capacity was 11,205 MW, with Ontario leading the country in installed capacity at 4,361 MW. OPA estimates this capacity will increase to 5,000 MW by 2025, but other studies estimate the capacity to reach 7,000 MW by 2020 and 8000 MW by 20XX.

==== Biomass ====
Biomass refers to organic matter from plants or animals that can be converted to energy. Bioenergy, in turn, is any form of energy (heat or electricity) generated from biomass.

The development of a bioenergy industry in Ontario faces many challenges including, but not limited to, high costs owing to the small-scale nature of technologies used to convert biomass to energy and environmental issues (e.g., declining soil productivity and increased fertilizer and pesticides use) related to intensive harvesting of biomass for energy production. That said, research that has been carried out to address some of these concerns suggests that the adoption of sustainable management practices that aim at maintaining ecological functions of forest and agro-ecosystems may sustain biomass production without adverse impacts to the environment.

The dual role of biomass as a substitute for fossil fuels and as a sink for atmospheric carbon is the main advantage for its use in energy generation. Bioenergy production from sustainable biomass sources is considered to be carbon neutral because CO_{2} emitted during combustion or natural degradation processes is captured by growing plants. Although biomass-based Integrated Gasification Combined Cycle (IGCC) and Combined Heat and Power (CHP) with carbon capture storage (CCS) may be promising technologies for reducing GHG emissions from electricity generating plants, these technologies are small-scale and not well developed in Ontario. The movement in favour of generating bioenergy from municipal waste appears to be a strategy to mitigate trash management; many municipal landfills are approaching capacity. There is a potential to generate income from methane emissions from municipal waste.

According to the IPSP, a total of 1,250 MW may be generated from biomass by 2027, but only 856 MW has been considered in plans thus far. Other reports suggest that biomass has the potential to produce about 14.7TWh (2,450 MW) of electricity and 47.0 TWh of heat in 10 – 20 years time.

At present, forest biomass is the main source of biomass used for energy production, followed by agriculture biomass as well as municipal solid waste and waste water.

- Forest biomass includes harvest residues (slash), residuals from silviculture operations, wood mill residues, peat, and short-rotation woody plantations such as willow plantations. A large part of this can be found in northern Ontario, where remote communities may benefit from relying on energy sources less dependent on a connection to the larger provincial grid. A feasibility study for generating electricity from forest biomass, peat or municipal waste at the Atikokan generating station in northwestern Ontario is currently under way.
- Agricultural biomass includes biogas from manure, crop and animal residues, as well as energy crops such as switchgrass and reed canary grass. Ontario has about 630,000ha of less productive agricultural land than could be dedicated to energy crop farming with a production capacity of 5.58 million tonnes of biomass (103PJ of energy) per year.
- Municipal biomass sources include solid waste and municipal wastewater. Decomposition of biomass produces gas that is 50% methane and 50% carbon dioxide. Thus, conversion of landfill gases to energy can reduce overall environmental impacts.

==== Solar and geothermal ====
Southern Ontario, in particular Toronto, receives as much summer solar radiation as the city of Miami, Florida, indicating that Ontario has sufficient solar energy that can be harnessed to generate electricity or heat. Unlike solar energy, geothermal heat pumps (GHP) produce heat energy that is mainly used for space and hot water heating. GHPs operate like refrigerators to transfer absorbed heat energy from below the frost line (about 1.2m soil depth for Southern Ontario) to connected buildings.

The OPA estimates that these technologies will contribute about 1,000 MW to Ontario electricity capacity by 2025. Although this estimate was used for planning purposes, it is possible that the capacity will increase in future as respective technologies develop. Some studies suggest that installed capacity of solar photovoltaic systems alone may be as much as 5,000 – 6,200MW by 2015.

=== Imports ===
Ontario has an interconnection capacity totalling 4,000 MW. Connecting jurisdictions include: New York, Michigan, Quebec, Manitoba and Minnesota. The provincial grid is connected to the Eastern Interconnection managed by the Northeast Power Coordinating Council.

The OPA Supply Mix Advice Report recommends 1,250 MW of imports for Ontario. This figure is derived mainly from short-term hydropower projects planned in Quebec. Hydro-Québec TransEnergie and Ontario's Hydro One, each province's electricity delivery company, signed a C$800 million agreement in November 2006 to construct a new 1,250 MW Quebec-Ontario interconnection by 2010.

There is also potential for new interconnections to Manitoba and/or Labrador. But due to cost and siting challenges, these plans remain tentative and are considered long-term possibilities (2015–2025).

Manitoba is planning two new hydropower projects, known as Conawapa Generating Station and Keyask (Gull) Generating Station, in northern Manitoba. Conawapa, located on the Lower Nelson River, is planned to have a projected capacity of 1,380 MW when it comes online in 2017. Keeyask, initially projected to be in service in 2011/2012, is expected to generate 600 MW. New long-distance high-voltage transmission lines will have to be built to the support the projects, as the existing interconnection line between Manitoba and Ontario is too small to allow for adequate upgrades.

Newfoundland and Labrador is planning to build two major generating stations, capable of generating roughly 2,800 MW on the Lower Churchill River in Labrador. The Muskrat Falls facility is to have a planned capacity of 824 MW, while the Gull Island project is expected to generate 2,000 MW. Any interconnection to Ontario, however, would need the support of both the Quebec Government and the federal government, as the transmission of electricity generated in Labrador must run through Quebec.

Most imports from the United States are based on nuclear, natural gas, or coal-fired generation facilities. As such, the Government of Ontario has expressed little interest in increasing electricity imports from the United States.

== See also ==
- Hydro One
- Ontario Hydro
- Ontario Power Generation
- Ontario Power Authority
- Independent Electricity System Operator
- Ontario Energy Board
- Association of Power Producers of Ontario
- Electricity policy of Alberta
- Energy policy of Canada
- Ontario Sustainable Energy Association
- Stranded debt
