= Ministry of Energy and Mines (Ontario) =

- Ministère de l’Énergie et des Mines (French)
- Government of Ontario wordmark

Ministry overview
- Formed: 1959, 1973
- Jurisdiction: Government of Ontario
- Ministers responsible: Hon. Stephen Lecce, Minister of Energy and Mines; Hon. Sam Oosterhoff, Associate Minister for Energy-Intensive Industries; David Smith, Rudy Cuzzetto, Parliamentary Assistants to the Minister of Energy and Mines
- Key document: Ministry of Energy Act, 2011
- Website: Ministry of Energy

The Ministry of Energy and Mines is the ministry in the provincial government of Ontario, Canada with policy responsibility of ensuring that Ontario's electricity system functions with reliability and productivity, and promoting innovation in the energy sector. Since June 6, 2024, the minister of energy is Stephen Lecce.

== History ==
=== Ministerial presence on Hydro-Electric Commission ===
While energy was not a formal dedicated department within the Ontario government until 1959, dedicated ministerial oversight has existed since as early as 1905 when newly elected Premier James Whitney appointed Sir Adam Beck to cabinet as a minister without portfolio to head a hydroelectric commission of inquiry. Beck was an advocate of public ownership of electricity distribution while in opposition, and was given wide latitude in the Whitney ministry to pursue rapid development of Ontario energy sources to support industrial growth. Upon the creation of the Ontario Hydro Commission in June 1906, Beck was appointed its chair and remained a member of cabinet for the entire duration of the Whitney ministry, and was routinely referred to as the power minister. While Beck was dropped from cabinet by Whitney successor's William Howard Hearst and lost his seat in 1919 when the United Farmers formed government under Ernest Drury, both premiers left Beck in his role as Hydro Commission chairman. Beck returned to the legislature in 1923 and was again invited by Premier Howard Ferguson to join cabinet as a minister without portfolio, as served until his death two years later.

Following Beck's death, John Robert Cooke, another minister without portfolio, took on ministerial responsibility for energy matters while serving as initially a commissioner and later as the chair of the hydro commission for the remainder of the Ferguson-Henry ministry. The practice was adopted by later ministries from time time. William Houck served as a hydro commissioner while serving as a minister without portfolio in the Liberal Hepburn ministry, and three ministers served in those same roles in the early years of the Frost ministry before the formal creation of a energy department. These ministers were routinely referred to as the "power minister" or "hydro minister" in press reports.

=== Department Formation ===
The Department of Energy Resources was formally established by legislation in 1959. The Ontario Fuel Board was also attached to the department until 1960. When the board was dissolved in 1960, its administrative functions were assumed by the department, while its judicial functions were taken over by the Ontario Energy Board. In 1964, the department acquired responsibility over the conservation authorities from the Department of Lands and Forests, and was renamed the Department of Energy and Resources Management.

In the throne speech delivered on March 30, 1971, the government acknowledged the competing priorities of environmental protection and of assuring adequacy of energy supply, and signaled its intention to integrate various related functions with the existing Department of Energy and Resources Management and to reconstitute it as the Department of the Environment. This plan was implemented through a number of legislations enacted in July 1971, right before that year's provincial election campaign was to start. The renamed department retained most of its existing functions including policy functions relating to energy conservation and energy supply while being given an additional mandate on environmental protection matters unrelated to energy. Functions relating to energy extractions, including the oversight of the Ontario Energy Board, were transferred to the Department of Mines and Northern Affairs, while functions relating to distribution and transmission were given to the Department of Labour. Incumbent energy and resources minister George Kerr became Ontario's inaugural Minister of environment (Note: and also gained the distinction as Canada's first provincial environment minister) while remaining the principal minister for energy matters during the two years period with no department named energy.

In 1973, the Ministry of Energy was re-constituted, assuming responsibilities over energy policy; energy conservation and planning; and energy technology development. Agencies which reported to the ministry included the Ontario Energy Board, the Ontario Energy Corporation, and Ontario Hydro.

Between 2008 and 2010, the ministry was merged with the Ministry of Public Infrastructure Renewal to form the Ministry of Energy and Infrastructure. The merger was formally effected by legislation between September 9, 2009 and June 5, 2011.

The Ministry resumed the name Ministry of Energy in 2010 (and formally via amendments to its enabling legislation in June 2011) and had remained as such under its enabling legislation. It has however been known by other names from time to time to highlight the policy priorities of the government of the day. These changes are given temporary effect by orders-in-council without formal amendments to the ministry's or other ministries' enabling legislations. The energy portfolio had also been held by minister jointly with other portfolios:

- Between 1993 and 1997, and again in 2002, the portfolio was held jointly with the Ministry of the Environment by four different ministers styled as Minister of Environment and Energy.
- Between 1997 and 2002, the ministry took on responsibility for Science and Technology, and its minister Jim Wilson was styled as the Minister of Energy, Science and Technology
- Between 2018 and 2021, energy minister Greg Rickford held the portfolio jointly with the Northern Development, Mines and Forestry portfolio and the Indigenous Affairs portfolio, and was styled as the Minister of Energy, Northern Development and Mines and Minister of Indigenous Affairs. References to a "Ministry of Energy, Northern Development and Mines" appeared routinely in government document, but the enabling legislations were never amended to formally effect any merger.
- For a nine month period between June 2024 and March 2025, incumbent energy minister Stephen Lecce was styled as Minister of Energy and Electrification. His title was updated to Minister of Energy and Mines in March 2025.

== Responsibilities ==
Several agencies and crown corporations are under the Ministry:

- Hydro One 1999–present; created from the breakup of Ontario Hydro
- Independent Electricity System Operator (IESO) 1998–present; created from the breakup of Ontario Hydro
  - Ontario Power Authority 2004–2015; now merged with IESO; created from the breakup of Ontario Hydro
- Ontario Energy Board 1999–present; created from the breakup of Ontario Hydro
- Ontario Power Generation (OPG) 1999–present; created from the breakup of Ontario Hydro

From 1974 to 1999 Ontario Hydro reported to the Minister, but the public utility was broken up into various agencies and crown corporations. Prior to 1974 Ontario Hydro reported to Commissioners appointed by the Premier and a few were Ministers without Portfolio.

=== Chair of the Hydro Electric Commission ===
The Commission was headed by a Chairman (along with two commissioners):

- Sir Adam Beck 1906–1925 (while a minister without portfolio 1905–14, 1923–25)
  - Commissioners (1919–23, appointed by the United Farmers Drury ministry): Dougall Carmichael (minister without portfolio), J. George Ramsden
- Charles Alexander Magrath 1925-1931
  - Vice Chair: John Robert Cooke (while a minister without portfolio)
- John Robert Cooke 1931–1934 (while a minister without portfolio)
- Robert H. Saunders 1948–1955 (a former mayor of Toronto, killed in a plane crash while in office)
  - Vice Chair (minister without portfolio): George Holmes Challies (while a minister without portfolio)
  - Vice Chair: Ross Strike (a former mayor of Bowmanville)
- Dr. Richard Hearn 1955–56 (incumbent general manager and chief engineer of the commission)
  - Vice Chair (minister without portfolio): George Holmes Challies (until August 1955), Bill Warrender (from August 1955)
  - Vice Chair: Ross Strike
- James S. Duncan 1956–61
  - Vice Chair (minister without portfolio): Ray Connell (until April 1958)
  - Vice Chair: Ross Strike
- George E Gathercole 1962–1974

== List of ministers ==
Name	Term of office		Tenure	Ministry (Party)	Note
Minister without Portfolio, while Ontario Hydro-Electric Commissioner					
Adam Beck	February 8, 1905	October 2, 1914	(non-portfolio)	Whitney Conservative	(Note: Commission Chairman 1905–25)
Dougall Carmichael	November 19, 1919	July 16, 1923	(non-portfolio)	Drury United Farmers	
Adam Beck	July 16, 1923	August 15, 1925	(non-portfolio)	Ferguson-Henry Conservative	
John Robert Cooke	September 12, 1925	July 10, 1934	(non-portfolio)	Ferguson-Henry Conservative	(Note: Commission Chairman 1931–34)
William Houck	October 12, 1937	May 18, 1943	(non-portfolio)	Hepburn-Conant Liberal	
George Holmes Challies	August 17, 1943	May 4, 1949	(non-portfolio)	Drew Conservative	(Note: From September 17 to October 19, 1948 Louis-Pierre Cécile was appointed Minister without portfolio for purpose of conducting an inquiry into municipal readjustment resulting from power development projects.He was however promoted to be a portfolio minister shortly prior to completing the inquiry.)
George Holmes Challies	May 4, 1949	August 17, 1955	(non-portfolio)	Frost Conservative	
Bill Warrender	August 17, 1955	November 1, 1956	(non-portfolio)	Frost Conservative	
Ray Connell	November 1, 1956	April 28, 1958	(non-portfolio)	Frost Conservative	
Minister of Energy Resources				Frost Conservative	
Robert Macaulay	May 5, 1959	November 8, 1961	4 years, 164 days	Frost Conservative	
Robert Macaulay	November 8, 1961	October 16, 1963	4 years, 164 days	Robarts Conservative	
John Richard Simonett	October 16, 1963	March 25, 1964	(to continue)	Robarts Conservative	
Minister of Energy Resource and Management				Robarts Conservative	
John Richard Simonett	March 26, 1964	June 5, 1969	5 years, 232 days	Robarts Conservative	
George Albert Kerr	June 5, 1969	March 1, 1971	(to continue)	Robarts Conservative	
George Albert Kerr	March 1, 1971	July 23, 1971	(to continue)	Davis Conservative	
Minister of the Environment				Davis Conservative	
George Albert Kerr	July 23, 1971	February 2, 1972	2 years, 242 days	Davis Conservative	
James Auld	February 2, 1972	July 4, 1973	1 year, 152 days	Davis Conservative	(Note: Continued as Minister of the Environment until February 26, 1974)
Minister of Energy				Davis Conservative	
Darcy McKeough	July 4, 1973	June 18, 1975	1 year, 349 days	Davis Conservative	
Dennis Timbrell	June 18, 1975	February 3, 1977	1 year, 230 days	Davis Conservative	
James Taylor	February 3, 1977	January 21, 1978	352 days	Davis Conservative	
Reuben Baetz	January 21, 1978	August 18, 1978	209 days	Davis Conservative	
James Auld	August 18, 1978	August 30, 1979	1 year, 12 days	Davis Conservative	(Note: Concurrently Minister of Natural Resources)
Bob Welch	August 30, 1979	July 6, 1983	3 years, 310 days	Davis Conservative	(Note: While Deputy Premier)
Philip Andrewes	July 6, 1983	February 8, 1985	1 year, 217 days	Davis Conservative	
George Ashe	February 8, 1985	May 17, 1985	98 days	Miller Conservative	
Mike Harris	May 17, 1985	June 26, 1985	40 days	Miller Conservative	
Vince Kerrio	June 26, 1985	September 29, 1987	2 years, 95 days	Peterson Liberal	
Bob Wong	September 29, 1987	August 2, 1989	1 year, 307 days	Peterson Liberal	
Lyn McLeod	August 2, 1989	October 1, 1990	1 year, 60 days	Peterson Liberal	
Jenny Carter	October 1, 1990	July 31, 1991	303 days	Rae NDP	
Will Ferguson	July 31, 1991	February 13, 1992	197 days	Rae NDP	
Brian Charlton	February 14, 1992	February 3, 1993	355 days	Rae NDP	(Note: Interim minister prior to September 23, 1992)
Minister of Environment and Energy				Rae NDP	
Bud Wildman	February 3, 1993	June 26, 1995	2 years, 143 days	Rae NDP	(Note: Styled as "Minister of Environment and Energy")
Brenda Elliott	June 26, 1995	August 16, 1996	1 year, 51 days	Harris Conservative	
Norm Sterling	August 16, 1996	October 10, 1997	1 year, 55 days	Harris Conservative	
Minister of Energy, Science and Technology				Harris Conservative	
Jim Wilson	October 10, 1997	April 14, 2002	4 years, 186 days	Harris Conservative	(Note: Styled as Minister of Energy, Science and Technology, effected by Order in Council)
Minister of Environment and Energy				Harris Conservative	
Chris Stockwell	April 15, 2002	August 22, 2002	129 days	Eves Conservative	
Minister of Energy				Eves Conservative	
John Baird	August 22, 2002	October 22, 2003	1 year, 61 days	Eves Conservative	
Dwight Duncan	October 23, 2003	October 11, 2005	1 year, 353 days (first time)	McGuinty Liberal	(Note: While Government House Leader) (Note: While Chair of Cabinet)
Donna Cansfield	October 11, 2005	May 23, 2006	224 days	McGuinty Liberal	
Dwight Duncan	May 23, 2006	October 30, 2007	1 year, 160 days (second time, 3 years, 148 days in total)	McGuinty Liberal	
Gerry Phillips	October 30, 2007	June 20, 2008	234 days (first time)	McGuinty Liberal	
Minister of Energy and Infrastructure				McGuinty Liberal	
George Smitherman	June 20, 2008	November 9, 2009	1 year, 142 days	McGuinty Liberal	
Gerry Phillips	November 9, 2009	January 18, 2010	70 days (second time, 304 days in total)	McGuinty Liberal	
Brad Duguid	January 18, 2010	August 18, 2010	(to continue)	McGuinty Liberal	
Minister of Energy				McGuinty Liberal	
Brad Duguid	August 18, 2010	October 20, 2011	1 year, 275 days	McGuinty Liberal	
Chris Bentley	October 20, 2011	February 11, 2013	1 year, 114 days	McGuinty Liberal	
Bob Chiarelli	February 11, 2013	June 13, 2016	3 years, 123 days	Wynne Liberal	
Glenn Thibeault	June 13, 2016	June 29, 2018	2 years, 16 days	Wynne Liberal	
Greg Rickford (Note: Styled as Minister of Energy, Northern Development and Mines and Minister of Minister of Indigenous Affair; Rickford was assigned protfolio responsibility for the Ministry of Energy, the Ministry of Northern Development, Mines and Forestry (both enacted by legislations) and the Ministry of Indigenous Affairs (in existence through a series of Orders-in-Council))	June 29, 2018	June 18, 2021	2 years, 354 days	Ford Conservative	(Note: During Rickford's tenure, Bill Walker served as Associate Minister of Energy from June 20, 2019 to June 18, 2021)
Todd Smith	June 18, 2021	June 6, 2024	5 years, 106 days	Ford Conservative	
Stephen Lecce (Note: From June 6, 2024 to March 19, 2025 styled as Minister of Energy and Electrification; From March 19, 2025 concurrently Minister of Mines and styled as Minister of Energy & Mine from March 19, 2025)	June 6, 2024	Incumbent	2 years, 118 days	Ford Conservative	(Note: During Lecce's tenure, Sam Oosterhoff serves as Associate Minister for Energy-Intensive Industries)
