= Ontario Power Authority =

Independent, non-profit corporation

- Company type: Independent non-profit corporation established under the Electricity Restructuring Act (Ontario)
- Industry: Electricity generation
- Founded: 2004
- Defunct: January 1, 2015
- Fate: Merged into IESO
- Headquarters: Toronto, Ontario, Canada
- Key people: Colin Andersen - Chief Executive Officer; James D. Hinds - Director and Board Chair
- Products: Electricity conservation, transmission procurement
- Number of employees: 200-250

The Ontario Power Authority (OPA) was an independent, non-profit corporation established through the Electricity Restructuring Act, 2004 (Bill 100). Licensed by the Ontario Energy Board, it reported to the Ontario legislature through the Ministry of Energy.

The OPA was responsible for:

- Assessing the long-term adequacy of electricity resources on Ontario
- Forecasting future demand and the potential for conservation and renewable energy
- Preparing an integrated system plan for conservation, generation, transmission
- Procuring new supply, transmission and demand management either by competition or by contract, when necessary
- Achieving the targets set by government for conservation and renewable energy.

In April 2012, the Energy Minister of Ontario Christopher Bentley introduced legislation in Parliament to merge the Ontario Power Authority and the Independent Electricity System Operator. Ontario Power Authority merged with IESO on January 1, 2015.

== See also ==
- Ontario Hydro
- Independent Electricity System Operator
