= Ontario Energy Board =

Ontario provincial energy regulator

- French: Commission de l'énergie de l'Ontario

Agency overview
- Formed: 1999
- Preceding agency: Ontario Hydro
- Type: Crown agency
- Jurisdiction: Government of Ontario
- Headquarters: 2300 Yonge Street; 27th floor Toronto, Ontario; M4P 1E4
- Minister responsible: Stephen Lecce, Minister of Energy and Mines
- Agency executive: Geoff Owen, Chair
- Key documents: Ontario Energy Board Act; Electricity Act; Energy Consumer Protection Act
- Website: oeb.ca

The Ontario Energy Board (OEB) is a Crown regulatory agency responsible for the regulation, rates, and licensing of the natural gas and electricity sectors in the Canadian province of Ontario. The OEB reports to the Minister of Energy and Mines.

== History ==
The Ontario Energy Board was created with the passing of the Ontario Energy Board Act, which was passed following the dissolution of Ontario Hydro through the passing of the Energy Competition Act in 1998.

== Electricity ==
In the electricity sector, the Board sets transmission and distribution rates, and approves the budget and fees of the Independent Electricity System Operator (IESO). The Board also sets the regulated price of electricity for residential and small business consumers on the Regulated Price Plan, and licenses all electricity retailers who sell electricity to residential and small commercial consumers.

== Natural gas ==
In the natural gas sector, the Board approves rates associated with the cost to transport, store and distribute natural gas from utilities to consumers as well as charges to administer natural gas accounts. The Board also approves the price utilities can charge consumers for the natural gas they use.

== See also ==
- Independent Electricity System Operator
- Electricity policy of Ontario
