= XL Foods =

XL Foods Inc. is a Canadian meat packing company. The company is a subsidiary of Nilsson Brothers Inc. based in Edmonton, Alberta. From 2009 until 2013, XL Foods' Lakeside Packers Division was located just west of Brooks, Alberta, in Newell County. This facility was the second largest beef-processing operation in Canada. During this period the company was by far the largest employer in Brooks, employing more than 2,200 people in 2012.

== History ==
XL Foods grew from a collection of ranches, feedlots and feed mills into one of the foremost Canadian-owned and operated beef processors in Western Canada. Nilsson Bros. reached an agreement to purchase the core beef assets, along with the company name, on November 22, 1998. In 2009, XL Foods bought Lakeside Packers from its U.S. parent company Tyson Foods, following a bitter strike at Lakeside that lasted through most of 2005 after the workers joined the United Food and Commercial Workers labour union.

== XL Lakeside shutdown ==
XL Foods was temporarily closed on September 27, 2012, by order of the Canadian Food Inspection Agency (CFIA) due to Escherichia coli O157:H7 being discovered in processed meat originating from the plant. The plant was testing incorrectly for E. coli in meat, so the testing procedures were made more stringent. The plant was processing between 2000 and 5000 cattle per day, representing approximately one-third of Canada's 2012 beef slaughtering capacity.

According to American regulators and the CFIA, testing practices in place at the plant were not stringent enough to protect consumers from the E. coli contamination. The incident was also linked to increased production at the plant during the time when the E. coli was detected.

A total of 18 confirmed cases of infection with E. coli O157:H7 were reported during the subsequent outbreak linked to XL Foods.

On October 18, 2012, it was announced that the XL Lakeside plant was to be taken over by JBS USA for 60 days with "an exclusive option to buy the Canadian and U.S. operations of XL Foods".

With the XL Foods recall, some experts like Sylvain Charlebois claimed that the XL Foods incident is an example of how a dysfunctional food safety culture can affect an organization.

The Brooks plant was sold to JBS Canada on January 14, 2013.
