= Providing the Balance of Power =

1989 report in Ontario, Canada

"Providing the Balance of Power: Ontario Hydro's Plan to Serve Customers' Electricity Needs" was a four-volume 1989 study to the year 2014 by Ontario Hydro, the then supplier of electric power for the province of Ontario, Canada. The general public of Ontario was provided with copies of this report free of charge, and ask for feedback.

== Overview ==
The report explained why Ontario needed an electricity plan. It analyzed the people using electricity, a flexible system for serving customers, priority resources to meet needs, choosing the best major supply options, finding a balanced solution, and it added a glossary about electricity.

The report was part of what was known as the "25-year plan". The report was intended to stimulate discussion of the various goals and methods to meet the objectives of Ontario Hydro. One purpose of the overall 25-year plan was to ensure there would be enough electricity to meet the growing demand at a price which would maintain various industries within their operating territory. Many opponents did not have sufficient resources to present their opposition in a business fashion and Ontario Hydro was mandated to provide financial resources to some opposing groups. One significant finding by an opposition group was that the report omitted defining the overall health effects of the presented options.

== Demand/Supply Plan Report ==
This report, in colour, with tables and graphs, went into details on the amount of electricity that was expected to be demanded from the electricity supply system every year until 2014, and showed how much additional generating capacity would have to be provided to meet that demand. For example, on page 3-15 is a table showing that, as an estimate, there is only a 10% probability that less than 28.6 gigawatts (GW) will be needed as peak in 2005, 29.0 GW in 2006, 29.6 GW in 2007, and 33.5 GW in 2014. The report went into great detail about what the needs were anticipated to be, defined resources, and examined various alternative plans (How much nuclear? Fossil fuel? Minimum pollution? Least expensive? Matters of politics? etc.) to ensure sufficient electricity would be available when it was needed in Ontario, considering not only the additional demand, but also the expected retirements before 2015 of older generating facilities.

Appendix A was about strategy (March 1989), Appendix B provides a list of references, and Appendix C is a glossary, including commonly used acronyms.

== Outcome ==
As a result of the recession of the early 1990s, power demand stopped rising at the historical rate for several years. As a result, the plan was perceived to be overly ambitious and the environmental assessment required to review it was eventually abandoned. Ontario Hydro essentially stopped any further future planning and concentrated on running its existing assets. As a result, in the early years of the 21st century, Ontario was suffering from inadequate domestic power supplies and had to import power from other utilities.

=== Actual peak demand and pricing ===
In July 15, 2005 a new power consumption record was set at 26,170 megawatts (MW). Ontario had to purchase 3400 megawatts at up to seven times the normal rate, according to Metro of July 19 quoting the Torstar News Service, to meet the peak demand. Unfunded electricity debt so far is $20.6 billion, with Ontario's household consumers being charged only 5 cents per kilowatt hour for the first 750 kilowatt hours, and only 5.8 cents for the remainder. The price of imported power had sometimes risen to nearly 39 cents a kilowatt hour, while it normally is in the 5 to 10 cent range.

Peak demand for 2006 was 27,005 megawatts. This is the peak demand as of December 2009.

Peak demand for 2007 was 25,737 megawatts.

Peak demand for 2008 was 24,195 megawatts.
