= Association of Power Producers of Ontario =

The Association of Power Producers of Ontario (APPrO) is a trade and professional body representing commercial electricity generators in Ontario, and the largest organization of its type in Canada.

APPrO was established in 1986 as the Independent Power Producers' Society of Ontario (IPPSO) and changed its name to APPrO in 2003. It projects a unified voice of advocacy for Ontario-based generators of all types, addressing a range of public policy and regulatory issues of concern to the power industry. The organization also operates industry conferences and produces a number of publications, both hardcopy and electronic. The APPrO conference is the largest annual event of its type in Canada.

APPrO currently has about 100 corporate members including TransCanada Corporation, Bruce Power and Brookfield Renewable Power, along with many lesser-known companies. APPrO members produce electricity from a range of sources including natural gas, hydroelectricity (waterpower), cogeneration, windpower, solar energy, biomass (wood waste), biogas, nuclear energy, and other sources.

APPrO's current advocacy work is focused on regulatory and policy issues affecting generators in Ontario including electricity market rules, power procurement processes, the regulation of the natural gas market, both provincially and federally, climate change rules and compliance mechanisms, approval requirements, transmission development, distributed generation, and a number of other issues.

The Canadian Power Conference and Trade Show is the APPrO's annual conference and is the only annual conference covering all types of generation in Canada.

== Structure and history ==
APPrO has frequently put forward the view that the greatest benefits for consumers of electricity are likely to be achieved through the development of open and competitive markets for the production of electricity. Since it was established in 1986, APPrO has been one of the most vocal and consistent advocates for wholesale electricity markets in Ontario. Originally incorporated as the Independent Power Producers' Society of Ontario, the organization grew in scale and scope during the 1990s.

APPrO's predecessor IPPSO was one of the forces that helped convince the Ontario government to end the near-monopoly status of the former Ontario Hydro and introduce a competitive wholesale market for electricity in the province.

The organization is governed by a Board of 28 directors, and is operated on a day-to-day basis by a President, an Executive Director and support staff. 14 of the directors are appointed as direct representatives of major generator members or staff, and the remainder are elected from various categories of APPrO members. The first full-time (and current) president of APPrO is David Butters.

Over the years, APPrO's efforts have affected important decisions in the areas of ramp rates, natural gas supply services, net load billing for network transmission services, market design, and large number of technical rules and procedures. APPrO has worked closely with the Ontario government to ensure that the concerns and perspectives of its members are reflected in the contracting process for various procurement processes. APPrO says it intends to continue to advocate for "fair access to the market for all generators, reasonable terms for interconnection to the electric grid, a more efficient system in the future, and lower costs for all users of the electric system in Ontario."

== See also ==
- Category:Electric power in Canada
- List of power stations in Canada
