= Lakeside Packers =

Lakeside Packers is a beef producer based in Brooks, Alberta. It is owned by JBS Canada, a subsidiary of JBS S.A., a Brazilian protein company.

== History ==
=== BSE Aid ===
As of June 2004, Lakeside Packers had received roughly $33 million Canadian dollars in financial aid from the Government of Alberta since a cow with bovine spongiform encephalopathy was found on an Alberta farm in May 2003.

=== 2005 labour dispute ===
Lakeside Packers was unionized under the United Food and Commercial Workers, and the union went on strike from October 12 to November 6, 2005. The union accepted a four-year contract after a member vote approved it by a margin of 56%.

=== Sale to XL Foods ===
As of March 2009, Lakeside Farm Industries, Ltd. was sold by Tyson to XL Foods, it is reported that Lakeside and its assets were sold to XL Foods Inc. for approximately $107 million.

=== Sale to JBS Canada ===
XL Foods sold the Lakeside Packers plant to JBS Canada on January 14, 2013.
