= 2005 BBC strike =

The 2005 BBC strike was a strike of more than 11,000 BBC workers over a proposal to cut 4,000 jobs and to privatise parts of the BBC under the management of Mark Thompson. Much of the BBC's regular programming was affected, with many programmes being replaced with pre-recordings, and some being halted altogether, with those that remained suffering in quality due to the striking of many technical workers.

== Background ==
The BBC was fragile, facing competition from other digital and cable broadcasting companies. The BBC is funded primarily by a television license and must convince the government to keep the license. At the time it needed to also convince the government to renew its government charter, which would expire the following year. The BBC was also facing conflict with the government at the time, after the BBC's unfavourable coverage of the Iraq War in 2003. An investigation led by Lord Hutton, a former judge, found that the BBC misrepresented the government's position on the war and engaged in sloppy reporting. Despite containing valid criticism of the BBC, the report was viewed by other sections of the media as an "establishment whitewash" – caused the BBC's chairman and director general to resign.

Mark Thompson was appointed as the new BBC director to replace those who resigned. In order to restore the BBC's reputation and reform it for the digital age, he cut budgets by 15% across the board and removed 3,780 jobs. This would have saved about £355 million (US$642 million) to reinvest in new programmes. This caused anger across the BBC, and many workers went on strike.
