= Stranded costs =

In discussions of electric power generation deregulation, stranded costs represent a public utility's existing infrastructure investments that may become redundant after substantial changes in regulatory or market conditions. An incumbent electric power utility will have made substantial investments over the years and will carry debt. The whole-life cost of electricity includes payments on this debt.

As technology improves, with all else equal, the cost of generating electricity falls. A new entrant to the market, unencumbered by debt, can build a modern plant and generate electricity at a lower cost than existing providers. Logical customers leave the incumbent utility for the new entrant, reducing the incumbent's revenue and spreading its debt payments across fewer remaining customers.

The problem is often caused by overlong depreciation schedules for capital investments by utilities, presuming that regulatory and market conditions would not change substantially.

Solutions to the stranded costs problem include assigning a portion of the incumbent utility's debt to the new entrant as a condition of entry, or charging all customers in the market area a "stranded cost recovery fee". In some cases, a government may assume a portion of an incumbent utility's debt and assign it to the public debt, thus freeing the incumbent to compete more efficiently against new entrants.

== See also ==
- Stranded asset
