= Independent Electricity System Operator =

Electric utility in Ontario, Canada

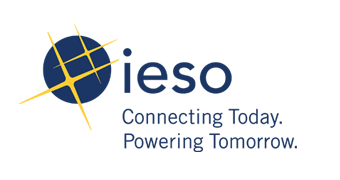
- Formerly: Independent Market Operator
- Type: Crown corporation
- Industry: Electric power transmission
- Founded: 1998
- Headquarters: Toronto, Ontario, Canada
- Key people: Lesley Gallinger, CEO
- Products: Electricity transmission and procurement
- Owner: Government of Ontario
- Website: ieso.ca

The Independent Electricity System Operator (IESO) is the Crown corporation responsible for operating the electricity market and directing the operation of the bulk electrical system in the province of Ontario, Canada. It is one of seven independent system operators in North America.

The IESO was established in April 1999 as the Independent Electricity Market Operator (IMO) under the government of Ontario during the premiership of Mike Harris in preparation for deregulation of the province's electrical supply and transmission system. As part of government plans to privatize the assets of Ontario Hydro, the utility was split into five separate Crown corporations with the IMO responsible for directing the flow of electricity across the high-voltage, province-wide network owned by Hydro One and other transmission companies. It was also given the responsibility of managing and operating the competitive wholesale electricity market and working with neighbouring jurisdictions to manage an integrated North American electricity network.

The IMO was renamed to the IESO in January 2005 as a result of the passage of Bill 100, which redefined the direction of deregulation and also led to the creation of the Ontario Power Authority.

As a Crown corporation, IESO is owned by the government of Ontario but operates at arm's length. It is governed by a board whose directors are appointed by the provincial government, its fees and licences are set by the Ontario Energy Board and it operates independently of all participants in the electricity market.

In April 2012, the Energy Minister of Ontario Chris Bentley introduced legislation in provincial Parliament to merge the Ontario Power Authority and IESO. The merger was expected to take place in late 2012. After the Premier of Ontario Dalton McGuinty resigned in the fall of 2012, the merger was postponed.

As of January 1, 2015 the IESO and the Ontario Power Authority were merged.

== See also ==
- Ontario Hydro
- Ontario Power Generation
- Hydro One
