= Hydro One =

Electricity transmission and distribution utility in Ontario, Canada

Hydro One Limited
- Type: Public
- Traded as: TSX: H; S&P/TSX 60 component
- Industry: Electric utilities
- Predecessor: Ontario Hydro
- Founded: 1999; 27 years ago in Toronto, Ontario, Canada
- Headquarters: Toronto, Ontario, Canada
- Area served: Ontario
- Key people: David Lebeter (president and CEO); Melissa Sonberg (chair)
- Products: Transmission and distribution
- Revenue: ▲CA$7.844 billion (2023)
- Net income: ▲CA$1.094 billion (2023)
- Total assets: ▲CA$32.852 billion (2023)
- Total equity: ▲CA$11.745 billion (2023)
- Owners: Government of Ontario (47.4%); OFN Power Holdings (2.4%); Ontario Power Generation (1.5%)
- Number of employees: 7,000 regular employees 2,200 non-regular employees
- Subsidiaries: Hydro One Networks Inc. Hydro One Remote Communities Inc. Acronym Solutions Inc. (formerly Hydro One Telecom Inc.)
- Website: www.hydroone.com

Hydro One Limited is an electricity transmission and distribution utility serving the Canadian province of Ontario. Hydro One traces its history to the early 20th century and the establishment of the Hydro-Electric Power Commission of Ontario (renamed "Ontario Hydro" in 1974). In October 1998, the provincial legislature passed the Energy Competition Act which restructured Ontario Hydro into separate entities responsible for electrical generation, transmission/delivery, and price management with a final goal of total privatization.

Hydro One was established at this time as a corporation under the Business Corporations Act with the Government of Ontario as sole shareholder. Following its initial public offering on the Toronto Stock Exchange in 2015, the Government of Ontario began selling shares to the public with a final goal of 60% of the company being held by private investors. A report released on December 2, 2015, by the Auditor General of Ontario raised concern with the sale, indicating that power outages are increasing and that Hydro One's equipment is aging and "at very high risk of failing". The estimated cost of necessary repairs was $4.472 billion.

== Service territory ==
Hydro One is a holding company with four subsidiaries, the largest being Hydro One Networks. It operates 98% of the high voltage transmission grid throughout Ontario, and serves 1.4 million customers primarily in rural areas across the province in its capacity as Ontario's largest distribution utility.

== System information ==
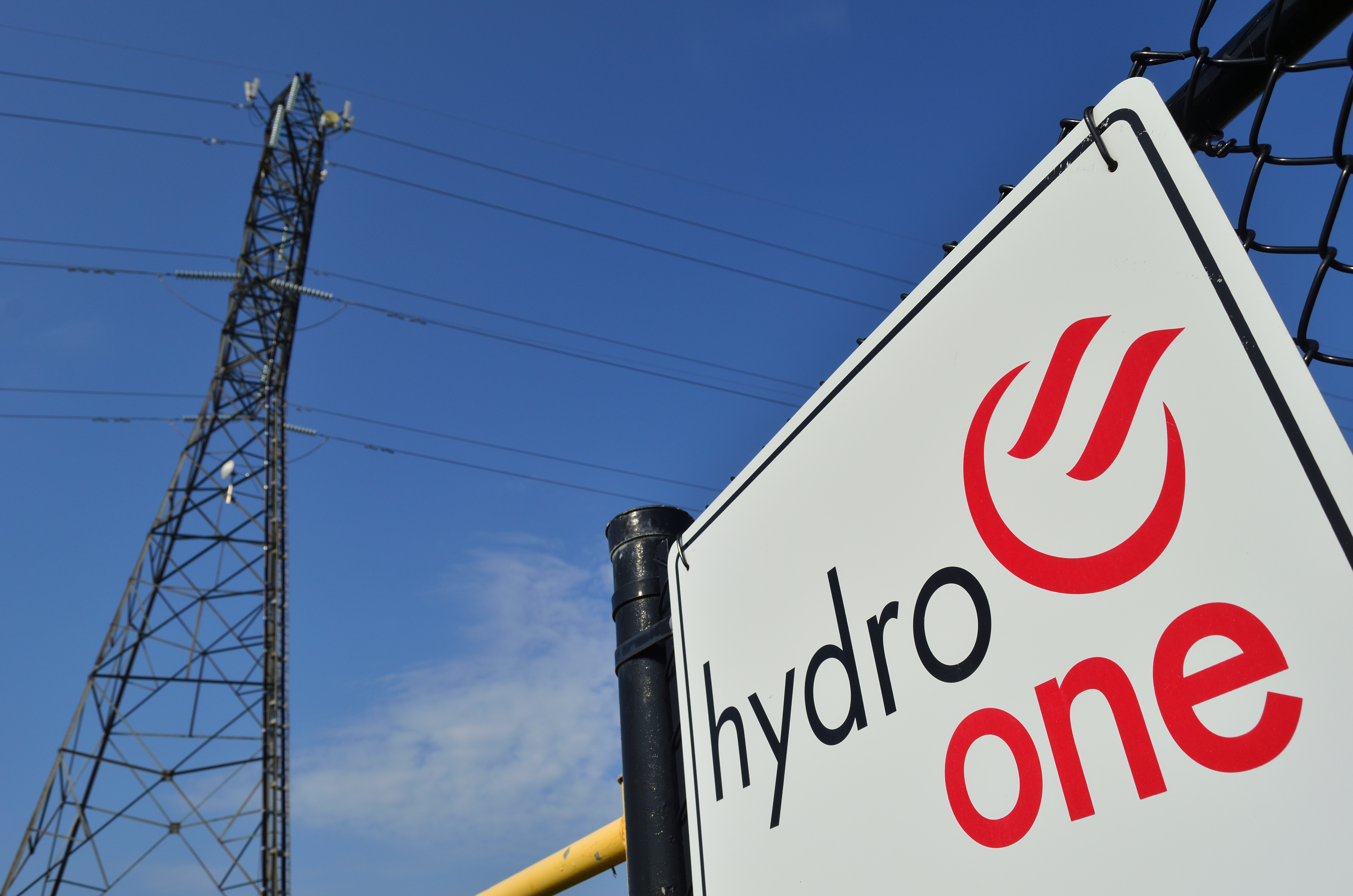
Hydro One's overhead power lines

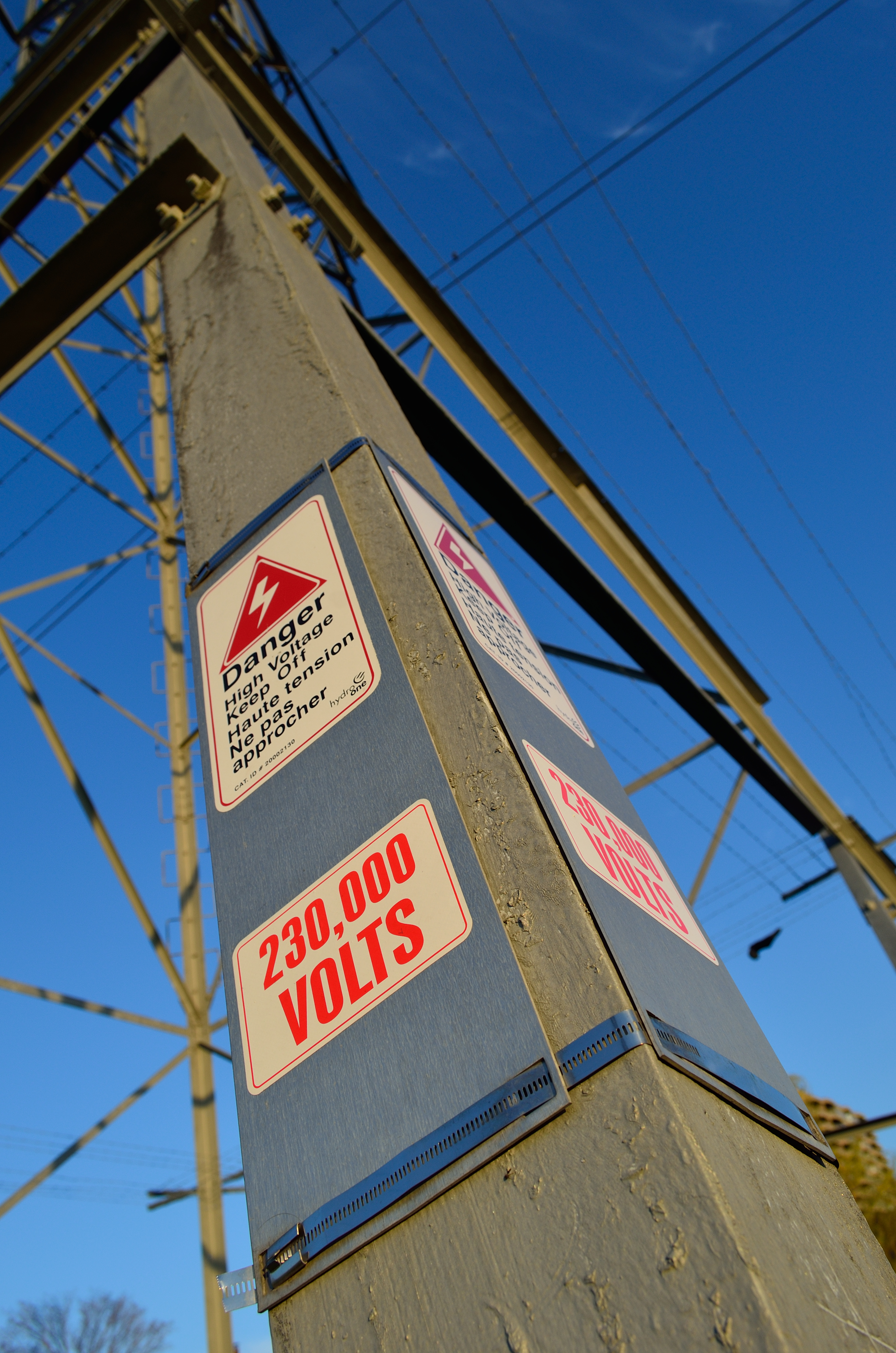
A pylon leg and warning signage from one of Hydro One's 230,000 volt transmission lines

Hydro One's transmission line voltages are 500,000, 230,000 and 115,000 volts AC. Hydro One has interconnections with Manitoba Hydro, Hydro-Québec, Minnesota Power, DTE Energy/ITC, National Grid (the former Niagara Mohawk Power) and the New York Power Authority.

=== Generators ===
Hydro One works with the transmission and distribution network by connecting generating facilities operated by Ontario Power Generation, Bruce Power, and a number of other privately owned companies, to it. The generators deliver the electricity they generate at hydroelectric, natural gas, wind, solar and nuclear facilities to businesses and people across Ontario. The generators have different responsibilities than Hydro One. The power from generators connected to Hydro One's high voltage system is transformed to more than 50 kV (50,000 volts). The transmission-connected generators are registered with the Independent Electricity System Operator (IESO). Transmission lines, strung between metal towers or concrete poles, are not as plentiful as their distribution lines, which are most commonly strung between wooden poles. The distribution system is connected to Hydro One's generating facilities. It delivers the electricity generated at hydroelectric, wind and other facilities to businesses and people across Ontario. These distribution facilities work at voltages of 50 kV or less.

Ontario's electricity grid is made up of a 29,000 km high-voltage transmission network that delivers electricity to large industrial customers and municipal utilities and 123,000 km low-voltage distribution system that serves about 1.3 million end use customers mainly in rural service areas and smaller municipal communities in the province. More than 75% of the applications to connect small generators are in Hydro One's rural service territory along the company's distribution system. While Hydro One has connected thousands of small projects to the grid it is approaching their technical limits of the wires and equipment in some rural locations. In these areas there are two issues that limit the number of projects that Hydro One can safely connect without putting the grid in jeopardy. The first issue is the physical limits of the power lines and the second is a phenomenon called 'islanding'. In larger areas that are densely populated, Hydro One's wires are thicker and designed to deliver larger amounts of electricity. In rural areas, Hydro One's distribution wires are smaller, thinner and deliver a smaller amount of electricity because they were designed to serve a much smaller number of customers than in large urban centers. These thinner lines deliver electricity safely and reliably to rural customers and are able to support the connection of small generation projects spread across the line, but these lines become over loaded when more electricity is fed back to the grid than the line was built to deliver. In some areas where the program is extremely popular, many generators want to connect to the same thin line but the line is not able to support the transfer of so much electricity.

The second issue is about islanding. Hydro One's distribution system knows how to protect itself under certain conditions. For instance, during a storm if a tree falls on a line, the system shuts itself down, similar to a circuit breaker. This protects the company's customers and employees from accidentally coming into contact with a live electrical line; it also protects appliances like televisions from uncontrolled surges and drops in voltage. In addition, when there is a fault, the line must be dead. Also when solar panels are attached to such lines, they must also be shut down when there is a fault on the line. If they are not shut down, electricity keeps flowing from the solar panels to all points between the panels. This can create an unsafe condition called islanding, which can put at risk customers, employees, and the equipment drawing power from that line. Hydro One prevents islanding by limiting the amount of generation that the company connects in one area; this ensures that the electrical load is greater than generation at all times. Ontario has moved to smart meters, which could support even more solutions to these problems. By using the company's existing network and working with customers, Hydro One is exploring new ways to deliver the cleaner electricity which Ontarians are helping to generate.

== History ==
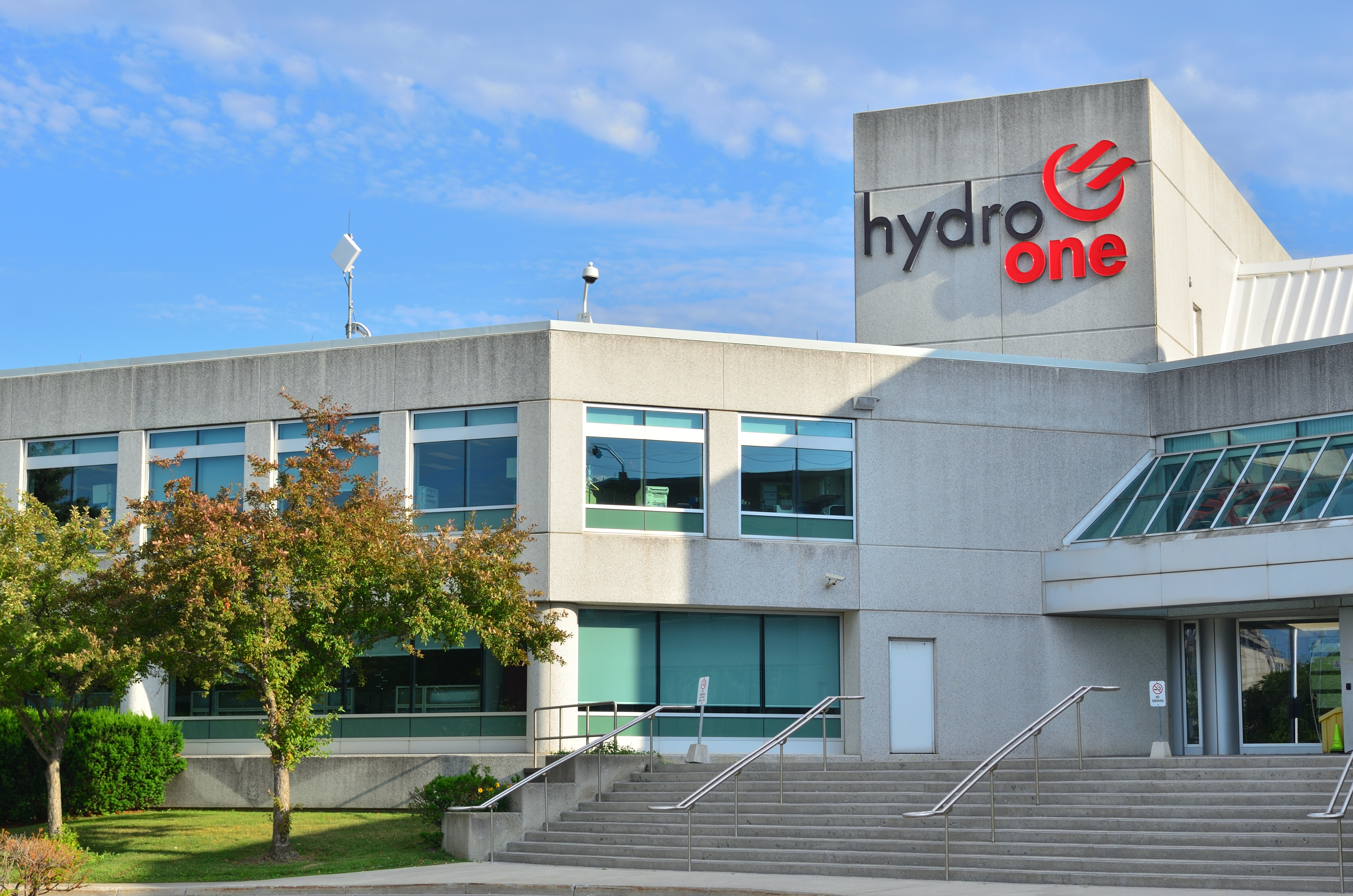
Hydro One office in Markham

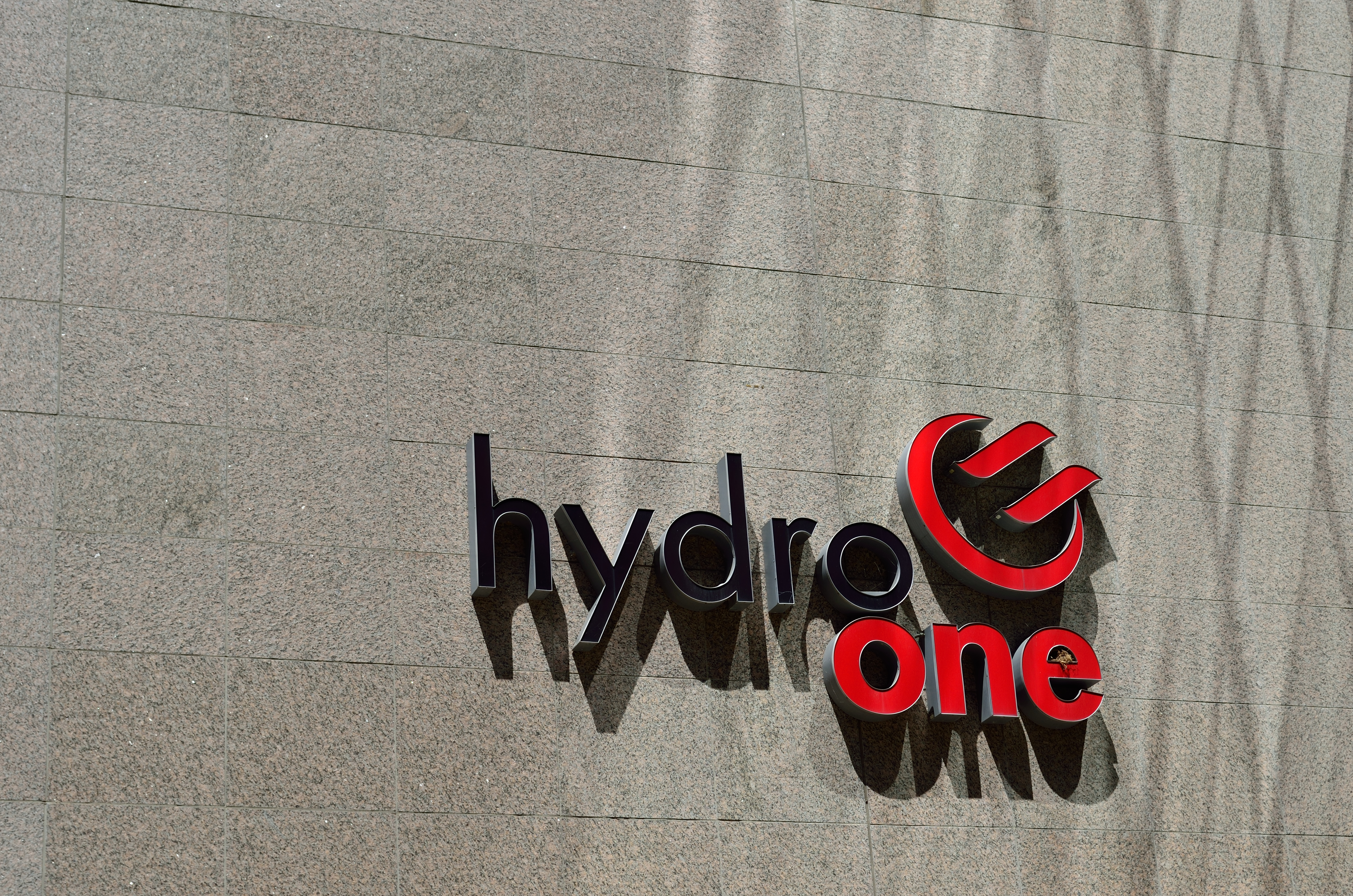
Hydro One Toronto head office

Hydro One was created out of the Hydro-Electric Power Commission of Ontario (HEPC or Ontario Hydro), which was established in 1906 by the provincial Power Commission Act to build transmission lines to supply municipal utilities with electricity generated by private companies already operating at Niagara Falls. The first chairman was Adam Beck, minister without portfolio in the provincial government of Sir James P. Whitney. Beck had been an advocate for a publicly owned electricity grid.

The commission's initial responsibility was to build transmission lines in order to supply municipal utilities with power. The power that was being transferred by HEPC was already being generated at Niagara Falls by private companies. Also during 1906, the company appointed Adam Beck as chairman. A year later, Beck and his colleague William Peyton Hubbard fought for the public ownership of the company. Later in 1908, HEPC purchased power from Niagara Falls and sought to transmit this power over its own lines, which at the time, had not been established. The company continued its steady growth for the next few years. and by 1914 HEPC built its first owned power generating station located on the Severn River.

In the early 1920s, HEPC expanded further and became an electricity distributor itself. The company now transmitted to rural areas in addition to municipal utilities. In 1922 the company's first unit of the Chippawa hydroelectric development on the Niagara River began service. Upon the unit's completion in 1925, it was the largest generating station in the world.

HEPC bought the generation and transmission assets of the Electrical Development Corporation, which was the last remaining private power company. In 1926, HEPC entered into a long-term contract with Gatineau Power Company, located in Quebec. These contracts were needed to accommodate a growing demand for power and electricity. However, these same contracts were to become a source of controversy during the Great Depression when there was an overcapacity in the system. The development of the St. Lawrence and Ottawa rivers was stalled by jurisdictional complications. The development of the rivers would have allowed access to a preferred source of power. In 1939 the Quebec contracts were reinstated and the development of the rivers were continued.

In the late 1940s and early 1950s HEPC took a great leap forward with development of hydro-electric potential along the St. Lawrence River. During the mid-1950s HEPC joined all its power stations and transmission systems into one network in order to become more efficient and flexible. Also during the 1950s, hydro-electric development was supplemented by the construction of thermal coal-fired power stations in Toronto. And by the end of the 1950s HEPC began construction of Canada's first extra-high voltage (500,000-volt) transmission lines. This brought power from northern Ontario to demand in southern Ontario. However, these transmission lines would only come into service in 1967. And by the start of the 1970s all of Ontario's power systems had merged, creating a province-wide grid.

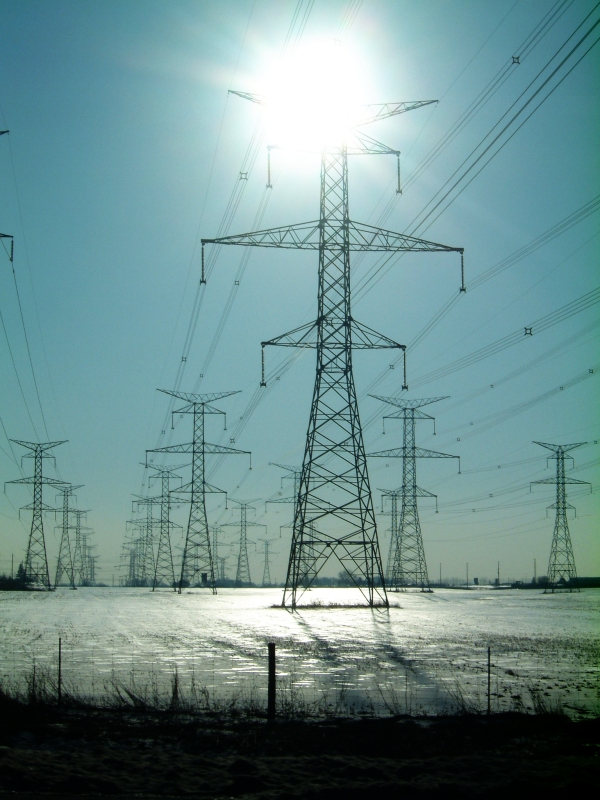
500,000-volt (centre) and 230,000-volt (far left and right) transmission lines in the Greater Toronto Area, for which Hydro One is responsible.

In 1974, the Power Corporation Act reorganized the system as a crown corporation called "Ontario Hydro", the name by which it was most usually known.

In 1998, the Progressive Conservative Party (PC) government of Mike Harris passed the Energy Competition Act which authorized the establishment of a market in electricity. In April 1999, Ontario Hydro was re-organized into five successor companies: Ontario Power Generation, the Ontario Hydro Services Company (later renamed Hydro One), the Independent Electricity Market Operator (later renamed the Independent Electricity System Operator), the Electrical Safety Authority, and Ontario Electricity Financial Corporation. The two commercial companies, Ontario Power Generation and Hydro One, were intended to operate as private businesses rather than as crown corporations.

By 2001, Hydro One had acquired 88 municipal utilities. In December 2001 the provincial government announced its intention to sell Hydro One under an initial public offering (IPO), however by April 2002 various groups in opposition to the plan challenged the government in the Ontario Superior Court of Justice, forcing a halt to the IPO.

In 2002, an electricity market began operating. However, critics questioned, among other things, whether the market was truly competitive or could ever become competitive, given that an electricity grid is not a private good. Public dismay at an increase in prices led the government of Harris's successor, Ernie Eves, to freeze electricity prices for residential and small business consumers. This freeze was maintained after the Liberal Party of Dalton McGuinty replaced the PC government in 2003. The freeze was removed and prices were raised in April 2004, and have been increased again subsequently.

In 2017, Hydro One agreed to acquire U.S. energy company Avista for CA$6.7 billion in cash.

In 2018, the annual CA$6.2 million compensation paid to CEO Mayo Schmidt became a campaign issue in the 2018 Ontario election. Progressive Conservative Party leader Doug Ford promised to remove Schmidt if elected, although it was speculated that it would cost CA$10.7 million in severance payments under a clause of "change of control" in Schmidt's contract, which shareholders had approved in May.

The PCs won the election and in July 2018, the newly elected government convinced CEO Mayo Schmidt to retire immediately. News reports indicated that Schmidt would receive a payment of CA$400,000 in lieu of continuing benefits and would also be entitled to receive incentive bonuses for previous years' achievements, Hydro One stock with a value of approximately CA$9 million. His annual pension was estimated as exceeding CA$160,000. The government and other major shareholders in Hydro One then began the process of appointing an entirely new board of directors after accepting the resignation of all previous members. The new Board is searching for a chief executive to replace Schmidt. In the interim, CFO Paul Dobson is serving as acting CEO.

In December 2018 the Washington Utilities and Transportation Commission blocked the purchase of Avista, citing concerns about the independence of Hydro One from the provincial government. Hydro One paid Avista a $103 million termination fee.

In March 2025, Hydro One Networks announced that it completed the acquisition of a 48% interest in the East-West Tie Limited Partnership, which owns the East-West Tie line, a 450-kilometre line between Wawa and Thunder Bay, for CAD 261 million.

== Restructuring ==
Ontario Hydro was restructured on April 1, 1999, into five separate entities: Ontario Power Generation, the Ontario Hydro Services Company, the Independent Electricity System Operator (originally named the Independent Electricity Market Operator), the Electrical Safety Authority, and Ontario Electricity Financial Corporation.

On May 1, 2000, the Ontario Hydro Services Company was renamed "Hydro One Incorporated" and reorganized as a holding company with four subsidiaries:

- Hydro One Networks Inc.
- Hydro One Remote Communities Inc.
- Hydro One Telecom Inc.
- Hydro One Brampton

Between 1998 and 2000, Hydro One acquired 88 municipal electrical utilities. Many local/municipal distribution companies were also consolidated during this time.

In May 2002, the provincial government launched an open electricity market, although generating and distribution remained under control of the government.

From 2000 to 2017, Hydro One directly owned the distribution utility for the city of Brampton. This subsidiary operated separately from the main Hydro One corporation and operated only in the city of Brampton. Hydro One Brampton was acquired by Alectra Utilities on February 28, 2017.

In August 2014, Hydro One acquired the assets and customers of Norfolk Power.

== Privatization ==
On October 29, 2015, Premier Kathleen Wynne confirmed rumours that the province planned to sell 60% of Hydro One ("broadening of ownership"), essentially completing the plan proposed by the PC government decades before. Some of the proceeds from the sale of shares would be used to begin financing of Premier Wynne's 10-year plan for public transit and infrastructure projects in addition to reducing the provincial deficit.

The plan was criticized by many, including Stephen LeClair, the new financial accountability officer for Ontario. LeClair warned that the sale of an entity that generated a $750 million profit in 2014 would lead to a long term negative financial impact for the province.

The sale will certainly provide short term benefits, generating an estimated total of $9 billion at a time when the provincial government is "desperate for money" (according to The Globe and Mail), with one of the largest subsovereign debts in the world. The estimated revenue will not all be a windfall for the provincial coffers however, since roughly $5 billion is earmarked to pay down Hydro One's $8.5 billion debt.

The balance of the revenue from the Hydro One sale would help meet the targets laid out by the provincial Liberal government in its April 2015 budget. Although the budget announced some austerity measures, there was no indication of any new revenue sources. Even so, the plan was to reduce the Province's estimated budget deficit by $2.5 billion to $8.5 billion in the 2015–16 fiscal year, then to $4.8 billion in 2016–17 and to have a balanced budget by 2017–18, according to Finance Minister Charles Sousa. This promise was made in spite of increasing demand for government services due to an aging population, at a time when "... a slowing domestic economy are putting downward pressure on its revenue streams," according to Ed Clark, Wynne's chief advisor on government assets, as quoted in The Globe and Mail.

On November 5, 2015, the province began the first phase of the process, with an initial public offering (IPO) of 81.1 million shares (equivalent to 13.6% of Hydro One) on the Toronto Stock Exchange. It was the largest IPO in Canada since 2000. The estimated proceeds from this IPO were expected to total $1.83 billion. This was the first step in the long-term goal of gradually selling 60% of the utility. Three more offerings, roughly the same size, followed in 2016 and 2017.

Finance Minister Sousa stated on November 4, 2015, that the Hydro One IPO was already "oversubscribed" at that time, with more advance orders than the shares that would be available. On November 5, 2015, the stock closed at $21.62, up 5.46% or $1.12 from the IPO price of $20.50, with more than 18 million shares sold. Although this is not necessarily indicative of a rosy future for the share price, Sousa was optimistic. "Every uptick on the market is an indication the future offerings will net even greater proceeds benefiting all Ontarians." However, shares dropped 3.9% on December 2, 2015, because of Auditor-General Lysyk's warning that the cost of replacing outdated transmission assets was $4.47 billion, information that might continue to depress the share price. Hydro One responded by indicating that steps were under way to increase reliability: "There are several initiatives under way to ensure investments strike the appropriate balance between reliability and cost."

Some consumer advocacy groups and some analysts raised red flags, concerned with the risk of increasing electricity costs under a privatized Hydro One. "Internal polling done for the Wynne government — released under Access to Information — found that 73 per cent of Ontarians oppose the government's plans to privatize Hydro One, the key transmission arm of the original public utility," noted Linda McQuaig in a 2016 Toronto Star opinion article.

On the other hand, Brady Yauch, executive director of the Consumer Policy Institute discussed the potential benefits in an opinion piece in the Financial Post, including "lower rates for ratepayers". His premise is based on the potential increase in productivity of Hydro One under private control, "something that the government has failed to do adequately", bringing high salaries into line, and reducing pension liabilities in future, with employees contributing higher amounts to their pensions. "Given the government's performance over the last 15 years, it calls for hopeful optimism ...", said Yauch.

A secondary offering of 72.4 million Hydro One shares, equivalent to 14.5%, in April 2016 generated $1.7 billion in revenue for the provincial government. Crown corporation Ontario Power Generation purchased 9 million of the shares, giving it a 1.5% stake in Hydro One.

In May 2017, the Ontario government completed the third and final sale of Hydro One shares worth $2.8 billion. After the offering, Ontario held 48.9% of Hydro One's common shares: 47.4% directly held by the government, and 1.5% held by Ontario Power Generation.

The Province of Ontario is a shareholder of Hydro One with approximately 47.2% ownership at September 30, 2021.

== First Nations and Métis relations ==
As part of the partial privatization of Hydro One, the provincial government announced it would sell up to 15 million shares (2.5%) to the indigenous and Métis nations of Ontario for "their collective benefit".

In January 2018 the Ontario government announced it had sold over 14 million shares of Hydro One to OFN Power Holdings, a partnership controlled by 129 First Nations around the province. The shares represented 2.4% of outstanding common shares, reducing the government's stake in the company to approximately 47.4%.

== See also ==
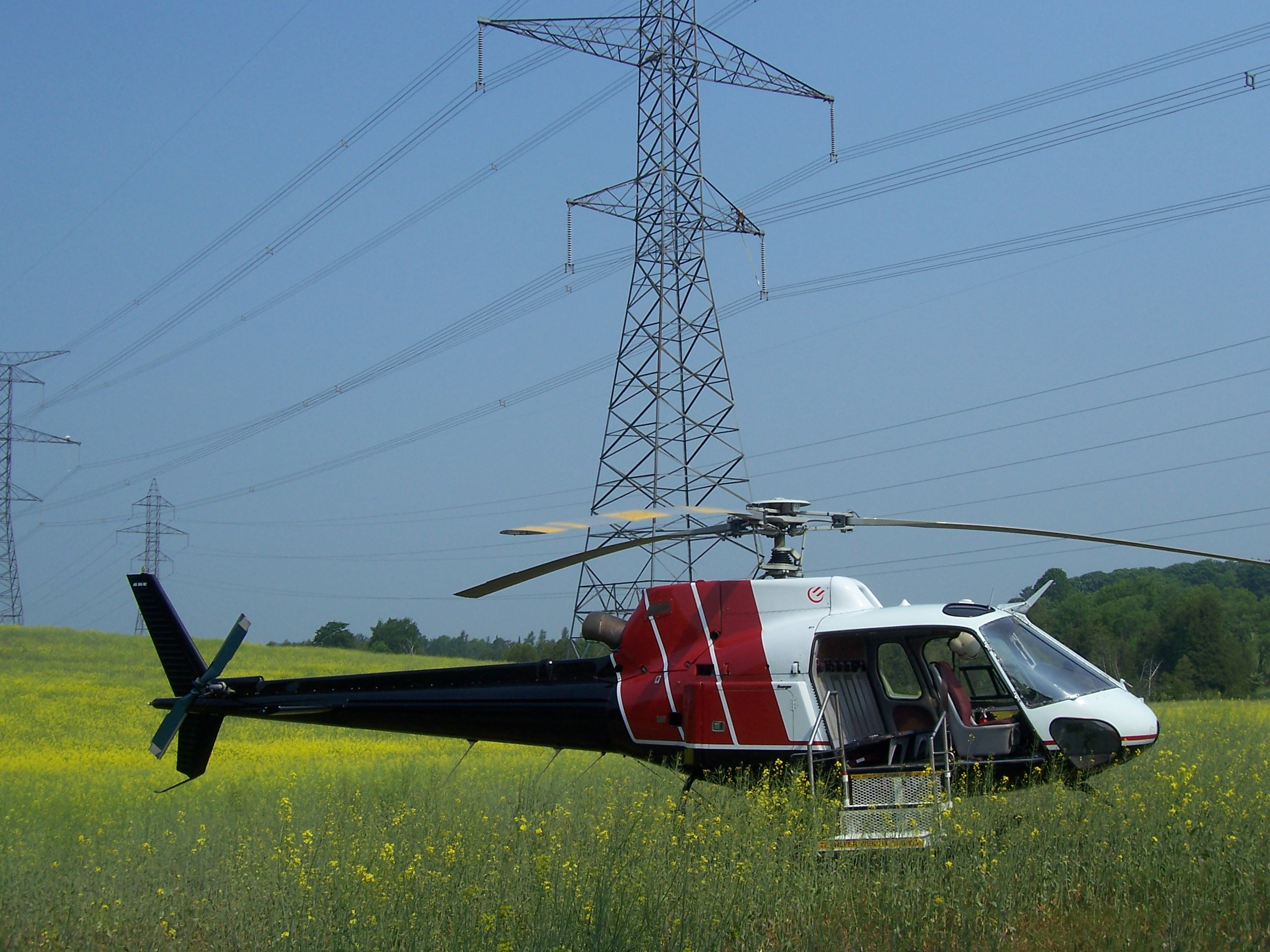
Hydro One - A-Star with AirStair attachment near transmission towers

- David F. Denison
- Electricity policy of Ontario
- Helicopter AirStair
- List of Canadian electric utilities
