= Kashabowie River =

Watercourse in Canada

- Location of the mouth of the Kashabowie River in Ontario

Location
- Country: Canada
- Province: Ontario
- Region: Northeastern Ontario
- District: Thunder Bay
- City: Kashabowie

Physical characteristics
- Source: Unnamed lake
  - coordinates: 48°44′32″N 90°34′13″W
  - elevation: 468 m (1,535 ft)
- Mouth: Shebandowan Lakes
  - coordinates: 48°38′47″N 90°25′09″W
  - elevation: 449 m (1,473 ft)

Basin features
- River system: Great Lakes Basin

The Kashabowie River is a river in southwestern Thunder Bay District in Northwestern Ontario, Canada. It is in the Great Lakes Basin and is a tributary of the Shebandowan Lakes.

== Course ==
The river begins at an unnamed lake, flows east to Lily Lake, and continues east to Kashabowie Lake. It drains the lake at the south passing over a dam, passes under Ontario Highway 11, at this point part of the Trans-Canada Highway, then under the Canadian National Railway Kashabowie Subdivision main line, built originally as the Canadian Northern Railway transcontinental main line; both crossings are between the community of Kashabowie to the west and the Postans flag stop to the east. The Kashabowie River then reaches its mouth on the north shore of Upper Shebandowan Lake, part of the Shebandowan Lakes. The Shebandowan Lakes flow via the Shebandowan River, the Matawin River and the Kaministiquia River to Lake Superior. A portion of the final stretch from Kashabowie Lake to Upper Shebandowan Lake lies in geographic Haines Township.

== Natural history ==
The 2,055-hectare (5,080-acre) Kashabowie Provincial Park is at the southeast of Kashabowie Lake and encompasses portions of the lake, and of the Sabrina Creek drainage basin including the mouth of Sabrina Creek at Kashabowie Lake. The park has features resulting from the Wisconsian age like an "...esker complex, outwash apron, and a glaciated lake spillway."

== Tributaries ==
- Kashabowie Lake
  - Crayfish Creek (right)
  - Sabrina Creek (left)
  - Athelstane Creek (left)

== See also ==
- List of rivers of Ontario
