= Swallow Lake =

Swallow Lake may refer to:

== Lakes ==
In Canada:

- In Nova Scotia:
  - Swallow Lake in Digby County at 44° 11′ 13″ North 66° 01′ 29″ West
  - In Queens County:
    - Swallow Lake at 44° 09′ 05″ North 65° 17′ 40″ West
    - Swallow Lake at 44° 30′ 28″ North 64° 55′ 56″ West
- In Ontario:
  - Swallow Lake (Algoma District) at 48° 01′ 14″ North 84° 43′ 51″ West
  - Swallow Lake (Cochrane District)
  - Swallow Lake (Nipissing District) at 45° 40′ 56″ North 78° 39′ 41″ West
  - Swallow Lake (Sudbury District) at 47° 12′ 34″ North 82° 17′ 38″ West
  - In Thunder Bay District:
    - Swallow Lake (Matawin River), the source of the Matawin River
    - Swallow Lake at 49° 39′ 14″ North 90° 28′ 39″ West
- Swallow Lake (Saskatchewan) at 52° 28′ 00″ North 102° 23′ 01″ West

Source for lakes in Canada: search on Atlas of Canada retrieved 2010-02-09
