= Oskondaga River =

- Location of the mouth of the Oskondaga River in Ontario

Location
- Country: Canada
- Province: Ontario
- Region: Northeastern Ontario
- District: Thunder Bay

Physical characteristics
- Source: Unnamed lake
  - location: Golding Township
  - coordinates: 48°50′01″N 89°54′15″W
  - elevation: 488 m (1,601 ft)
- Mouth: Shebandowan River
  - location: Dawson Road Lots Township
  - coordinates: 48°35′36″N 89°54′21″W
  - elevation: 397 m (1,302 ft)

Basin features
- River system: Great Lakes Basin
- Tributaries
  - left: East Oskondaga River

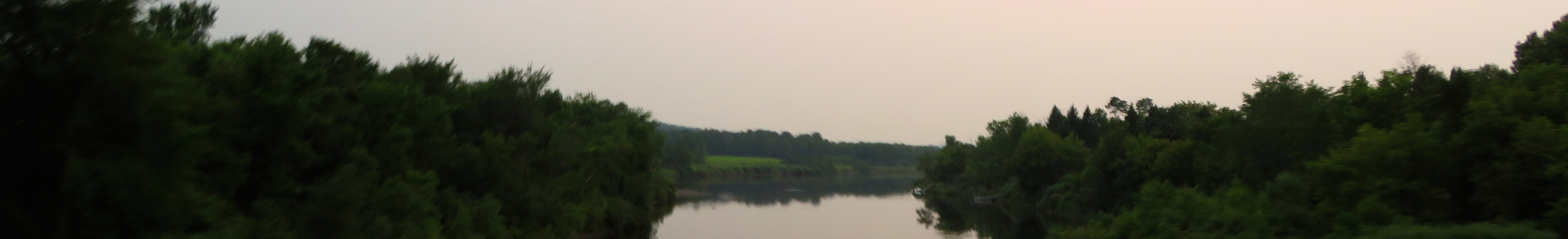
An image of the river as seen from the Ontario highway

The Oskondaga River is a river in Thunder Bay District in Northwestern Ontario, Canada. It is in the Great Lakes Basin and is a left tributary of the Shebandowan River. The river valley is paralleled by Ontario Highway 17, at this point part of the Trans-Canada Highway; and by both the Canadian Pacific Railway transcontinental main line, still in operation, and the Canadian National Railway Graham Subdivision main line, originally built as part of the National Transcontinental Railway, now abandoned.

== Course ==
The river begins at an unnamed lake in geographic Golding Township, just north of the community of Raith, at the watershed divide between the Atlantic Ocean and Arctic Ocean drainage basins. It heads southeast, then south, enters geographic Goldie Township, and takes in the left tributary East Oskondaga River. The river continues south into geographic Dawson Road Lots Township, flows under Ontario Highway 17 and the concurrent Ontario Highway 11 at the community of Shabaqua Corners, and reaches its mouth at the Shebandowan River. The Shebandowan River flows via the Matawin River and the Kaministiquia River to Lake Superior.

== Tributaries ==
- East Oskondaga River (left)

== See also ==
- List of rivers of Ontario

== Sources ==
- Map 13 (PDF) (Map). 1 : 1,600,000. Official road map of Ontario. Ministry of Transportation of Ontario. 2014.
- Restructured municipalities - Ontario map #2 (Map). Restructuring Maps of Ontario. Ontario Ministry of Municipal Affairs and Housing. 2006. Archived from the original on 2014-04-10.
