= Atikokan =

Town in Ontario, Canada

- Town (single-tier)
- Town of Atikokan
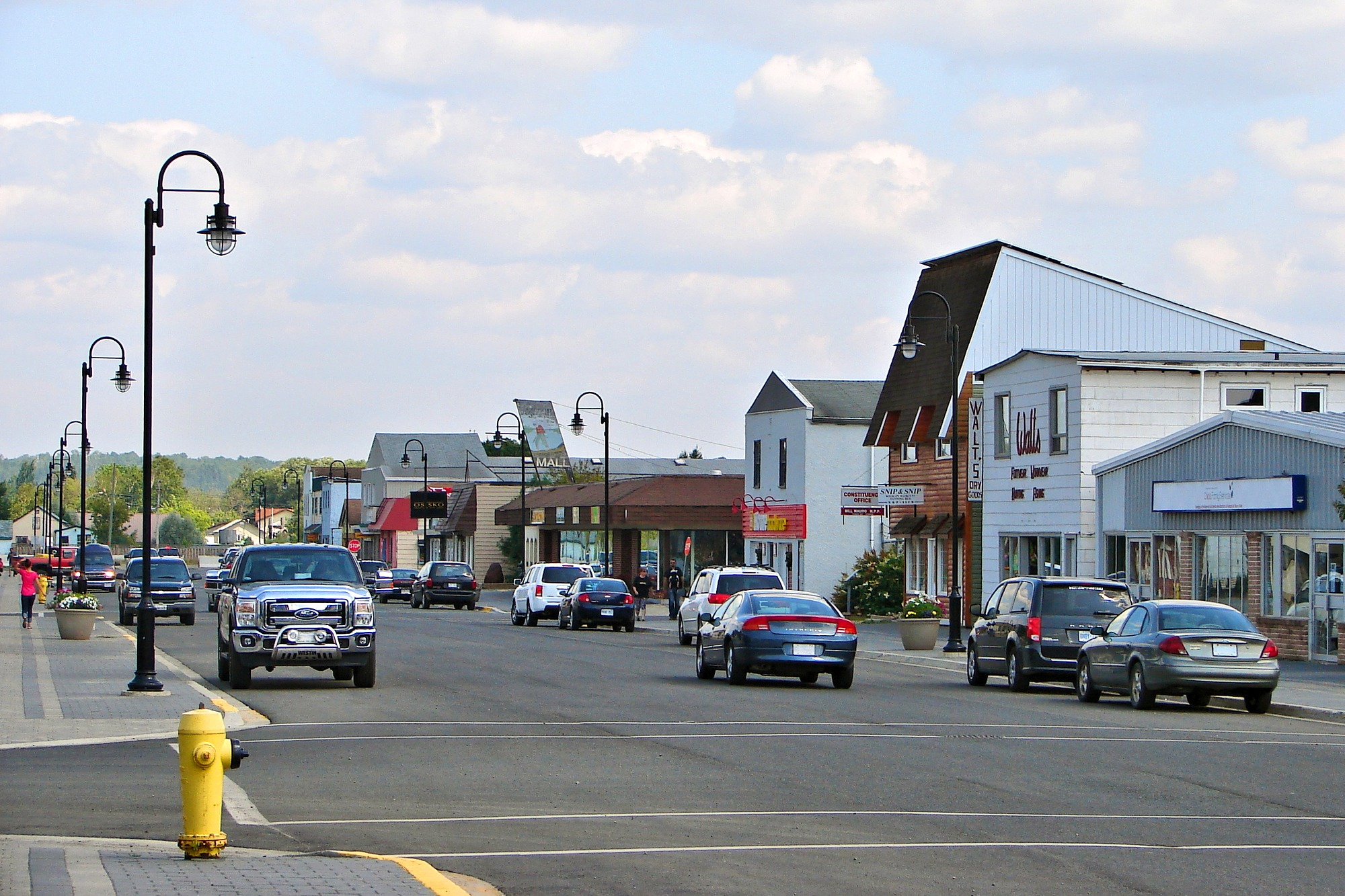
- Motto: Canoeing Capital of Canada
- Location within Ontario
- Coordinates: 48°45′N 91°37′W
- Country: Canada
- Province: Ontario
- District: Rainy River
- Settled: 1899
- Incorporated: 1954

Government
  - Mayor: Rob Ferguson
  - Federal riding: Thunder Bay—Rainy River
  - Prov. riding: Thunder Bay—Atikokan

Area
  - Land: 313.64 km^{2} (121.10 sq mi)
  - Urban: 2.37 km^{2} (0.92 sq mi)
- Elevation: 395.30 m (1,296.9 ft)

Population (2021)
  - Total: 2,642
  - Density: 8.4/km^{2} (22/sq mi)
  - Urban: 1,929
  - Urban density: 815.1/km^{2} (2,111/sq mi)
- Time zone: UTC−5 (EST all year.)
- Postal code: P0T 1C0
- Area code: 807
- Website: www.atikokan.ca

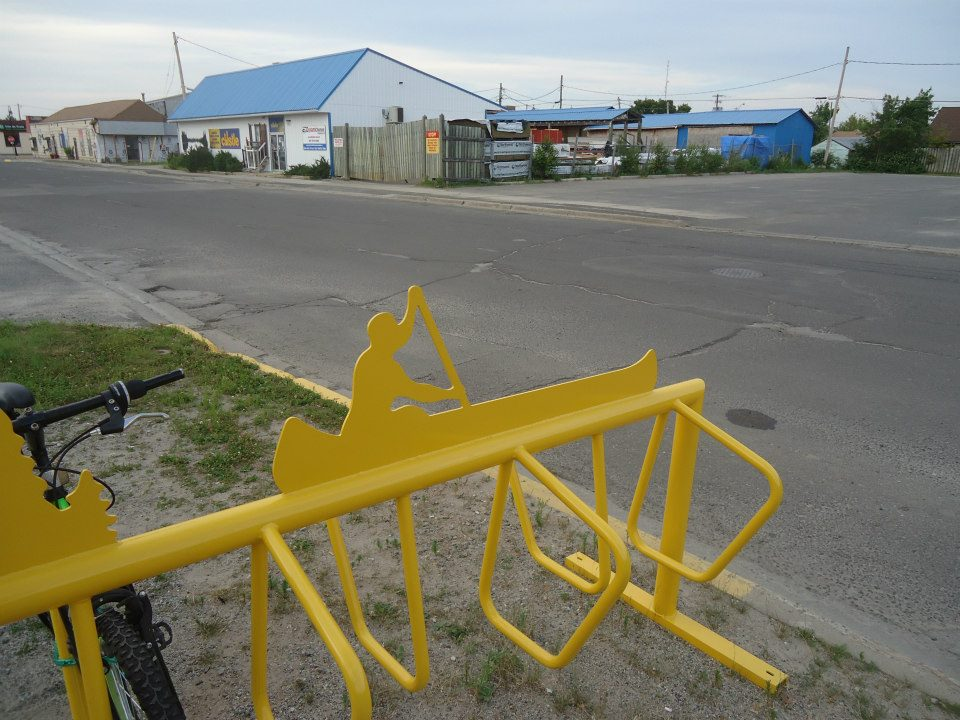
A bike rack in Atikokan, Ontario. Because the town is considered the "Canoeing Capital of Canada", a number of canoe symbols are seen around town.

Atikokan (/ˌætɪˈkoʊkən/) is a town in the Rainy River District in Northwestern Ontario, Canada. The population was 2,642 as of the 2021 census. The town is one of the main entry points into Quetico Provincial Park and promotes itself as the "Canoeing Capital of Canada". Atikokan was originally established as a Divisional Point for the Canadian Northern Railway.

The town of Atikokan is an enclave within the Unorganized Rainy River District. It is geographically located within the Central Time Zone, but uses Eastern Standard Time year round.

== History ==
=== Early history ===
The inhabitants to the Atikokan area at the time of first contact with Europeans were the "Oschekamega Wenenewak" (Ojibwa/Chippewa). They lived by themselves until the arrival of Jacques de Noyon in 1688. His journey was critical for the expansion and exploration of the Atikokan area.

=== 19th century to mid-20th century ===
==== The road to Atikokan ====
Palliser Gladman-Hind suggested the first real road in the area, he intended for it to go as far as possible starting from Arrow Lake, and after the road's end travellers would take a waterway to Fort Frances. Simon Dawson, on the other hand, thought the road could go from Dog Lake, to Thunder Bay, then using a series of dams, would allow even the larger boats to travel along the route of Dog River, Savanne River, Lac des Mille Lacs, via Pickerel Lake and Sturgeon Lake.

The government, ignoring both plans, decided to build a road west of Lac des Mille Lacs, down the Seine River and finally into Rainy Lake. In 1859, Simon James Dawson was hired to begin the route, but the plan was held up due to poor economic conditions in the east. In 1867, after Confederation, there became an increased need for communication to the west. Construction of the Dawson Trail began in Prince Arthur's Landing in 1868. Construction was sped up in 1869 as the Riel Rebellion resulted in the need to transport troops.

==== The first settler residents ====
Tom Rawn and his wife, Mary, were the first residents of Atikokan of European descent, arriving by canoe in 1899. Rawn was lured to Atikokan by both the allure of gold in the area and because of plans by the Canadian Northern Railway to build a divisional point. Tom moved here because he heard there was need of shelter for the workers on the railway. Within a year of moving to Atikokan, Tom Rawn built the Pioneer Hotel, which had 18 rooms on its second story. In 1900, he was the first to strike a claim for iron ore in the Steep Rock area.

In 1937, when Julian Cross discovered ore, it seemed Atikokan had potential for becoming a real town. The first real showing was the construction of the Canadian Imperial Bank of Commerce on Clark Street. Pitt Construction arrived later to construct roads. Their new way of making roads with machines amazed old-timers, who were used to making them using a pick, shovel and wheelbarrow. In 1950, the population had grown to 3,000 people.

The first businesses in Atikokan could buy lots on Main Street for $10 an acre, but the prices soon skyrocketed to $100 per square foot. Even with high costs, stores, restaurants, banks and other establishments sprang up quickly. The second bank to open was the Toronto-Dominion, the third, the Royal Bank of Canada is the only remaining bank.

=== Economic history ===
==== Fur trade era ====
During the fur trade era, major fur transportation and trading routes used by the voyageurs passed through the waters and portages south of what would later be Atikokan.

==== Mining ====
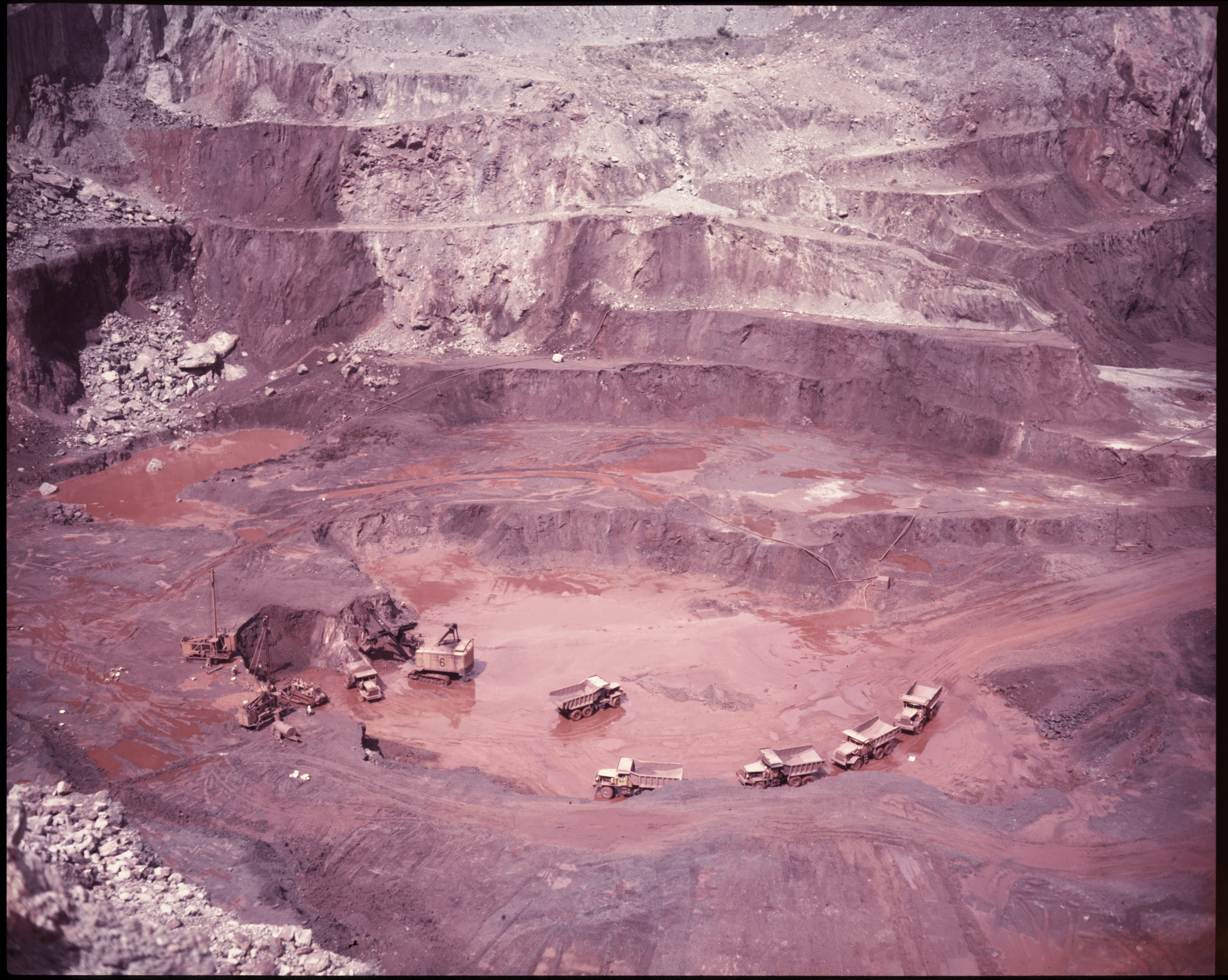
Steep Rock Mine, Atikokan, 1953

The potential for Steep Rock iron mine was revealed in 1897 by a non-resident geologist, William McInnis. Nothing was done until the winter of 1929–1930, when Julian Cross started interviewing iron and steel companies to try to unlock Steep Rock's potential. He finally convinced a company from Duluth, Minnesota, led by Robert Whiteside to take the job.

In 1932, Dr. McKenzie and Tom Rawn staked out the entire South East bay of Steep Rock. They then found a spot, sunk a shaft and found it was rich with high grade hematite. The mine was quickly abandoned as they had trouble keeping water out of it. In 1940, Rawn sold 109 claims located west of Steep Rock to Midwest Iron Mining Corporation, and in March of that year, with 60 claims in his name, created Rawn Iron Mines Ltd. Four months later, on July 23, Rawn went out prospecting near Sapawe, and never returned. Parties searched for weeks, but his remains were never found.

An indigenous person discovered The Hammond Reef Mine in 1894 on the shore of Sawbill Lake, about 30 miles from Atikokan and showed it to John Hammond. A 10 stamp mill was built there in 1897 and 30 more stamps were added along with a hydro electric power house. It closed in 1899 because the results were disappointing. It then reopened in 1938.

==== Forestry ====
Timber was first noticed in the area as early as the 1870s. There were 31 surveys, with 21 being in Quetico Provincial Park and 10 being in the Clearwater and White Otter Castle area. The first attempt at harvesting timber in the area was in 1886. A sawmill was located on the height of land east of the French Portage.

The strip between Lac La Croix and French Lake held great potential for logging of red and white pine, however, the barren shores around Saganaga show that there were multiple fires there, with approximately one sixth of the total area having been destroyed by fires. These forest fires were usually caused by the carelessness of troops that passed through the area years before on the Dawson Trail. H.C. Smith described the aftermath as "gigantic, half burned dead pines, which, towering in the air, add so much to the wildness and desolation of the scene" and "too often caused by the carelessness of explorers, prospectors, and hunters; The Indians are very careful to extinguish their fires during the dry season ... it is regretted that the fatal carelessness of the others cannot be checked." He noted that the pine in the unburnt area was excellent. The best trees were said to be found on Trout, Darkey, and Brent Lakes, and the farthest Southeast end of Sturgeon Lake.

=== Recent history ===
Before the 2nd World War, mineral exploration in the area determined the presence of a large, high grade, iron ore deposit at the bottom of Steep Rock Lake. After the war a large water diversion project on the Seine River system was undertaken to enable the draining and dredging of Steep Rock lake in order to develop open-pit mining operations.

Two large mines (Steep Rock Iron Mines and Caland Ore Co.) commenced operations in the late 1950s and continued for more than 30 years. When the mines closed in the early 1980s the town of Atikokan suffered economically but continued to survive on natural resource-based industries and tourism.

In 1994, a 10 megawatt hydroelectric generating station (Valerie Falls Power) was developed on the Seine River diversion that had facilitated the opening of the mines 40 years earlier. From 2012 until 2014, the Atikokan Generating Station was converted from a coal-fueled to a hundred percent biomass-fueled plant.

On February 1, 2013, Resolute Forest Products announced its plans to develop a new single-line random-length sawmill located in the Atikokan area, to be operational in 2014. The plan would create 90 direct jobs in Atikokan, with the additional benefit of supplying residual forest products to nearby pulp and paper mills.

== Climate ==
Atikokan has a humid continental climate (Köppen Dfb) with four distinct seasons. Winters are long, cold and snowy while summers are warm. Precipitation is higher during the summer months and lower during the winter months.

The highest temperature ever recorded in Atikokan was 42.2 °C (108 °F) on July 11 & 12, 1936. This is the highest temperature ever recorded in the province of Ontario. Atikokan shares this record with Fort Frances. The coldest temperature ever recorded was −48.9 °C (−56 °F) on 19 January 1943 and 15 February 1939.

Climate data for Atikokan, 1991−2020 normals, extremes 1914−present
Month	Jan	Feb	Mar	Apr	May	Jun	Jul	Aug	Sep	Oct	Nov	Dec	Year
Record high °C (°F)	10.0 (50.0)	15.1 (59.2)	25.6 (78.1)	28.3 (82.9)	35.0 (95.0)	37.8 (100.0)	42.2 (108.0)	37.0 (98.6)	37.2 (99.0)	30.0 (86.0)	21.4 (70.5)	11.0 (51.8)	42.2 (108.0)
Mean daily maximum °C (°F)	−9.8 (14.4)	−6.3 (20.7)	1.4 (34.5)	9.0 (48.2)	17.0 (62.6)	22.4 (72.3)	24.7 (76.5)	23.5 (74.3)	18.3 (64.9)	9.3 (48.7)	0.6 (33.1)	−6.6 (20.1)	8.6 (47.5)
Daily mean °C (°F)	−15.4 (4.3)	−13.8 (7.2)	−5.5 (22.1)	2.3 (36.1)	10.3 (50.5)	16.0 (60.8)	18.6 (65.5)	17.4 (63.3)	12.6 (54.7)	4.7 (40.5)	−3.7 (25.3)	−11.7 (10.9)	2.7 (36.9)
Mean daily minimum °C (°F)	−21.6 (−6.9)	−20.3 (−4.5)	−12.6 (9.3)	−4.2 (24.4)	3.5 (38.3)	9.6 (49.3)	12.4 (54.3)	11.2 (52.2)	6.8 (44.2)	0.2 (32.4)	−7.7 (18.1)	−16.4 (2.5)	−3.3 (26.1)
Record low °C (°F)	−48.9 (−56.0)	−48.9 (−56.0)	−46.7 (−52.1)	−32.2 (−26.0)	−13.9 (7.0)	−6.1 (21.0)	−2.2 (28.0)	−6.7 (19.9)	−12 (10)	−28.9 (−20.0)	−39.4 (−38.9)	−46.1 (−51.0)	−48.9 (−56.0)
Average precipitation mm (inches)	28.8 (1.13)	24.7 (0.97)	37.4 (1.47)	42.9 (1.69)	70.8 (2.79)	103.3 (4.07)	97.9 (3.85)	97.8 (3.85)	91.6 (3.61)	68.4 (2.69)	48.2 (1.90)	27.9 (1.10)	739.6 (29.12)
Average rainfall mm (inches)	0.3 (0.01)	1.0 (0.04)	11.6 (0.46)	27.1 (1.07)	66.6 (2.62)	103.3 (4.07)	97.9 (3.85)	97.8 (3.85)	89.4 (3.52)	58.4 (2.30)	12.2 (0.48)	2.9 (0.11)	568.3 (22.37)
Average snowfall cm (inches)	40.7 (16.0)	33.8 (13.3)	32.8 (12.9)	16.2 (6.4)	4.2 (1.7)	0.0 (0.0)	0.0 (0.0)	0.0 (0.0)	2.7 (1.1)	11.6 (4.6)	42.8 (16.9)	35.3 (13.9)	220.2 (86.7)
Average precipitation days (≥ 0.2 mm)	13.9	11.7	12.4	9.0	12.5	15.2	14.6	14.2	14.7	13.9	14.2	13.8	160.0
Average rainy days (≥ 0.2 mm)	0.61	1.1	3.2	6.0	12.1	15.2	14.6	14.2	14.4	11.0	4.2	1.1	97.7
Average snowy days (≥ 0.2 cm)	15.4	12.8	11.3	4.6	1.0	0.0	0.0	0.0	0.56	4.8	13.4	15.2	79.0
Mean monthly sunshine hours	105.5	116.3	158.6	218.1	248.6	247.7	279.4	231.7	157.9	109.8	76.0	74.8	2,024.3
Percentage possible sunshine	38.8	40.5	43.1	53.2	52.6	51.3	57.4	52.1	41.7	32.7	27.4	28.9	43.3
Source: Environment Canada (precipitation/rain/snow/sunshine 1971–2000)

== Demographics ==
In the 2021 Census of Population conducted by Statistics Canada, Atikokan had a population of 2,642 living in 1,259 of its 1,464 total private dwellings, a change of −4% from its 2016 population of 2,753. With a land area of 313.64 km^{2} (121.10 sq mi), it had a population density of 8.4/km^{2} (21.8/sq mi) in 2021.

Canada census – Atikokan community profile

	2021	2016	2011
Population	2,642 (-4.0% from 2016)	2,753 (-1.2% from 2011)	2,787 (-15.4% from 2006)
Land area	313.64 km^{2} (121.10 sq mi)	319.52 km^{2} (123.37 sq mi)	319.29 km^{2} (123.28 sq mi)
Population density	8.4/km^{2} (22/sq mi)	8.6/km^{2} (22/sq mi)	8.7/km^{2} (23/sq mi)
Median age	51.6 (M: 50.8, F: 52.4)	50.3 (M: 50.2, F: 50.4)	48.5 (M: 47.9, F: 48.9)
Private dwellings	1,464 (total) 1,259 (occupied)	1,477 (total)	1,460 (total)
Median household income	$69,000	$58,598

References: 2021 2016 2011

Historical census populations – Atikokan

Year	Pop.	±%
1951	2,821	—
1956	6,113	+116.7%
1961	7,093	+16.0%
1966	6,386	−10.0%
1971	6,087	−4.7%
1976	5,803	−4.7%
1981	4,452	−23.3%
1986	4,345	−2.4%

Year	Pop.	±%
1991	4,047	−6.9%
1996	4,043	−0.1%
2001	3,632	−10.2%
2006	3,293	−9.3%
2011	2,787	−15.4%
2016	2,753	−1.2%
2021	2,642	−4.0%

Source: Statistics Canada

== Economy ==
Atikokan's main employers are the Atikokan Generating Station located 20 kilometres north of the community, the general hospital, Quetico Provincial Park and (collectively) its canoeing outfitters. Ontario Power Generation (OPG) has been one of Atikokan's main employers since the early 1980s. Constructed as a fossil-fuel burning facility, the Atikokan Generating Station burned coal shipped from Saskatchewan until 2012. It was then converted to a biomass plant, re-opening in 2014. Formerly, Fibretech, a fibre board processing plant in Atikokan closed, but was converted by Rentech Inc. to produce wood pellets to supply the newly converted biomass generating station.

The Sapawe lumber mill located approximately 30 km from Atikokan reopened under management of Resolute Forest Products. The mill employs 108 workers.

Agnico Eagle Mines Limited is planning a new gold mine and ore processing facility at its Hammond Reef site approximately 30 kilometres north of Atikokan. A revised environmental assessment was approved in 2018, building on work by previous owner Osisko Mining Corporation. Two main open pits are planned, and the adjoining plant will process 60,000 tonnes of ore per day. Agnico Eagle planned to assess the economic viability of the mine in 2019.

== Transportation ==
The town is located off Highway 11, between Thunder Bay and Fort Frances. A CN Rail branch line runs along the south side of town. When Atikokan opened its first rail line, fares were $15. Atikokan Municipal Airport is located to the northwest of the town.

== Recreation ==
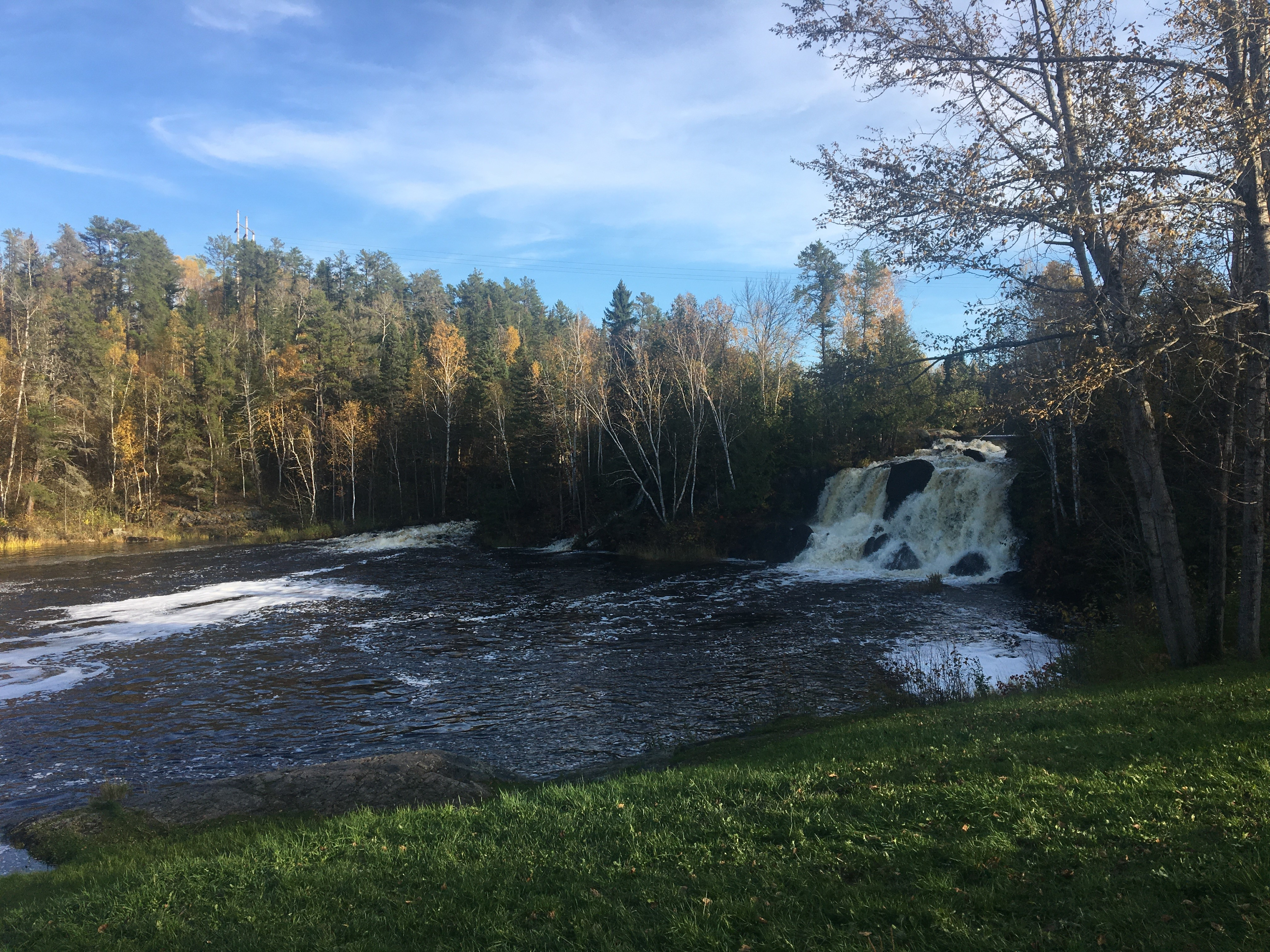
Little Falls, a scenic water body within the town limits

Atikokan was selected as the host site for the 2003 edition of 'Raid the North Extreme', a televised 6 day multi-sport expedition race that visits wilderness locations across Canada. A key factor in the selection was the proximity to Quetico Provincial Park. Quetico Park, located about 20 minutes south from the town of Atikokan, is a protected park with a route of lakes that was once traveled by the voyageurs.

In 2018 the Town of Atikokan completed a project to connect and renovate the existing Atikokan Municipal Swimming Pool and Community Arena. The resulting modern facility was named the Atikokan Recreation & Wellness Centre which features a 14,580 square foot ice surface, 25 meter long pool, and multi-purpose room with adjoining kitchen available for private rentals.

A large portion of recreation in Atikokan is at the town's Charleson Recreation Area. The area is named for the Canadian Charleson Iron Mine (a subsidiary of Charleson Iron Mining Co. of Minnesota), which was an iron ore mine operating there between 1958 and 1964. In 2005 the Charleson Recreation Area Committee formed to consolidate the various groups that use the area into a working committee that would develop the area for further recreation use by town residents and to enhance tourism potential. The committee continues to meet monthly to discuss and implement maintenance and improvements.

Major Annual events in Atikokan include the Atikokan Bass Classic, a smallmouth bass tournament for teams of all kinds, the Poker Run and Annual Sno-Ho Rally held by the Atikokan Sno-Ho Snowmobiling Club and the Atikokan Mud Slingers 4x4 Races, where drivers can show off their trucks and skills to try and make it through a 300-foot mud track at Charleson Recreation Centre.

Little Falls Recreation Centre is the home of Little Falls Golf Club and Little Falls Curling Club. Little Falls Golf Club is a 9-hole course that is double tee'd so players have the option of a 9 or 18 hole game. Little Falls Curling Club has a four sheet rink and hosts various bonspiels throughout the season.

Just 9 km North of town, off of Highway 622, is Atikokan's Mount Fairweather Ski Hill. Mount Fairweather opened in 1967 for downhill skiing and snowboarding and continues to operate weekends and holidays from December to March (weather permitting). Mount Fairweather is a 106-meter drop with 12 name runs and operates both a rope tow lift and a T-bar lift. The chalet has helmets, boots, and skis available for use for free on a first come first served basis and also offers a canteen, washrooms, comfortable seating, and an outdoor sun deck.

The Town of Atikokan also operates parks, playgrounds, three skating rinks, Bunnell Park Campground, the Pioneer Club (a drop in centre for seniors), toboggan hill (the previous location of the Mount Fairweather Ski Hill), and two baseball diamonds.

Other clubs and activities in Atikokan include: Atikokan Minor Hockey Association, Atikokan Figure Skating Club, Beaten Path Nordic Trails, Mount Fairweather Alpine Skiing, Atikokan Sno-Ho Snowmobiling Club, Atikokan Bowling Association, Atikokan Public Library programs, Atikokan Native Friendship Centre (ANFC) and Quetico Provincial Park's Natural Heritage Education outreach programs.

Fitness facilities exist at the Atikokan Native Friendship Centre (ANFC) and Ironworks Gym.

== Arts ==
The Atikokan Public Library started on December 16, 1952, with only 700 books. Currently it has a varied collection of 30,000 items such as books, CDs, DVDs, and e-books, and offers public computers and computer instruction.

The Atikokan Centennial Museum has a collection of heavy equipment from early logging, mining and railroad days.

The Atikokan Entertainment Series offers six or more high quality performances per season.

Quetico Provincial Park's Artist in Residence Program offers workshops, demonstrations and opportunities to artists from around the world to immerse themselves in the beauty of the area.

The Pictograph Gallery is a volunteer-run gallery that features arts and crafts of local and regional artists.

== Municipal government ==
The 40th Council for the Corporation of the Town of Atikokan was elected in October 2022, for a term ending in 2026. In this election, previous councillor Rob Ferguson was elected as mayor to lead the municipal government in Atikokan. In addition to the mayor, a total of six councillors represent Atikokan, two of which were reelected; Liz Shine and Jim Johnson, while four Councillors; Gord Knowles, Gord Martin, Kristi McQuay, and Janelle Zacharias are new to council.

== Hospital ==
The Atikokan General Hospital is a 41-bed hospital. Serving about 6,000 patients a year, this hospital offers emergency care, long-term care, and rehabilitation services.

== Education ==
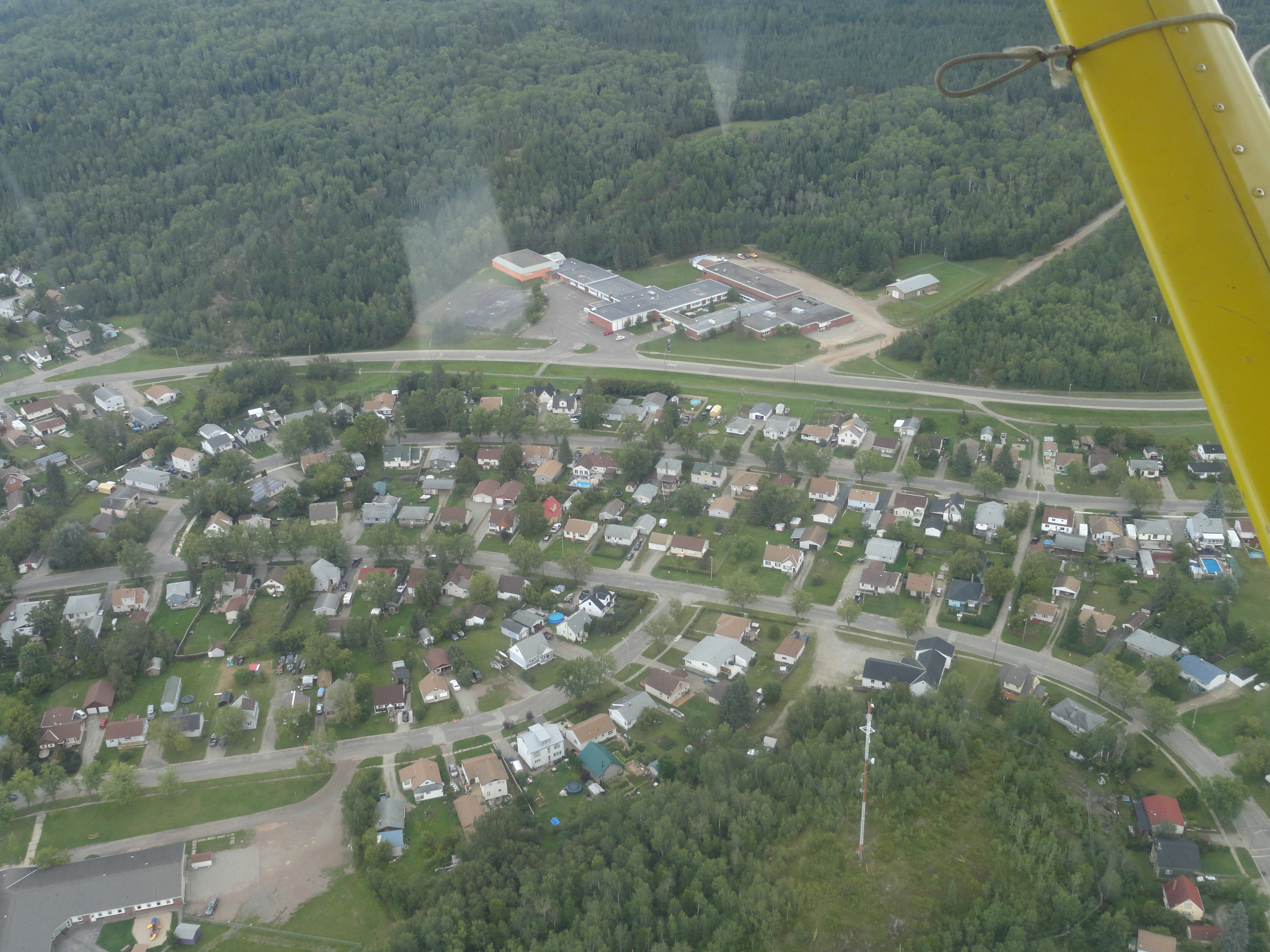
Partial view of Atikokan as seen from above

Atikokan is served by one separate school (administered by the Northwest Catholic District School Board) and one public school (administered by the Rainy River District School Board).

Community schools:

- Northern Lakes K-12 School
- St. Patrick's Separate School (K-8)

== Media ==
Newspapers:

- Atikokan Progress

Radio:

- FM 90.1 - CBQI, CBC Radio One
- FM 91.1 - CKAX tourist information from the Town of Atikokan
- FM 93.5 - 91.5 CKPR repeater from Thunder Bay (signed on in 2011)
- FM 95.9 - CFOB Fort Frances repeater (formerly used by CKDR Dryden until 2010)

Television:

- Channel 7 - CBWCT-1 - CBC - no longer transmitting (since digital conversion of TV transmitters)

== See also ==
- List of municipalities in Ontario
