= Swamp River (Ontario) =

- Location of the mouth of the Swamp River in Ontario

Location
- Country: Canada
- Province: Ontario
- Region: Northeastern Ontario
- District: Thunder Bay

Physical characteristics
- Source: Unnamed lake
  - coordinates: 48°44′32″N 90°11′06″W
  - elevation: 534 m (1,752 ft)
- Mouth: Shebandowan Lakes
  - location: Conacher Township
  - coordinates: 48°37′29″N 90°05′31″W
  - elevation: 449 m (1,473 ft)

Basin features
- River system: Great Lakes Basin

The Swamp River is a river in Thunder Bay District in Northwestern Ontario, Canada. It is in the Great Lakes Basin and is a tributary of Shebandowan Lakes.

== Course ==
The river begins at an unnamed lake and loops northeast then back south to Swamp Lake. It turns east, then south, then southwest, takes in the left tributary Drift Creek, and heads southeast, parallelled by the Canadian National Railway Kashabowie Subdivision main line, built originally as the Canadian Northern Railway transcontinental main line. It passes into geographic Conacher Township, flows past the railway point of Rossmere, then turns south, passes under the railway and then under Ontario Highway 11, at this point part of the Trans-Canada Highway, and reaches its mouth at Lower Shebandowan Lake, part of the Shebandowan Lakes. The Shebandowan Lakes flow via the Shebandowan River, the Matawin River and the Kaministiquia River to Lake Superior.

== Tributaries ==
- Drift Creek (left)

== See also ==
- List of rivers of Ontario

== Sources ==
- Map 13 (PDF) (Map). 1 : 1,600,000. Official road map of Ontario. Ministry of Transportation of Ontario. 2014.
- Restructured municipalities - Ontario map #2 (Map). Restructuring Maps of Ontario. Ontario Ministry of Municipal Affairs and Housing. 2006.
