= Shebandowan Lakes =

- Location in Ontario
- Location: Thunder Bay District, Ontario
- Coordinates: 48°38′35″N 90°18′06″W
- Type: Lake
- Part of: Great Lakes Basin
- Primary inflows: Greenwater Creek, Kashabowie River, Swamp River
- Primary outflows: Shebandowan River
- Basin countries: Canada
- Max. length: 40 kilometres (24.9 mi)
- Max. width: 5 kilometres (3.1 mi)
- Surface elevation: 449 metres (1,473 ft)

Shebandowan Lakes is the name for the combined entity of three lakes — Upper Shebandowan Lake at the west, Middle Shebandowan Lake at the centre, and Lower Shebandowan Lake at the east — in the Unorganized Part of Thunder Bay District in Northwestern Ontario, Canada. The lakes are in the Great Lakes Basin, and Lower Shebandowan Lake is the source of the Shebandowan River.

The primary inflows are Greenwater Creek at the southwest; the Kashabowie River at the north; and the Swamp River at the northeast. The primary outflow is the Shebandowan River, which leaves Lower Shebandowan Lake over a weir at the east at the community of Shebandowan, and flows via the Matawin River and the Kaministiquia River to Lake Superior.

Ontario Highway 11, at this point part of the Trans-Canada Highway, follows the north shore of the lakes. Ontario Highway 586 branches from Highway 11 along an isthmus between Middle Shebandowan Lake and Lower Shebandowan Lake. The Canadian National Railway Kashabowie Subdivision main line, built originally as the Canadian Northern Railway transcontinental main line, also follows the north shore of the lakes. Kashabowie/Upper Shebandowan Lake Water Aerodrome is on Upper Shebandowan Lake.

== Tributaries ==
Clockwise from the Matawin River outflow

- Harden Creek
- Greenwater Creek
- Firefly Creek
- Kashabowie River
- Swamp River
