= Thunder Bay Generating Station =

Biomass power station in Thunder Bay, Ontario, Canada

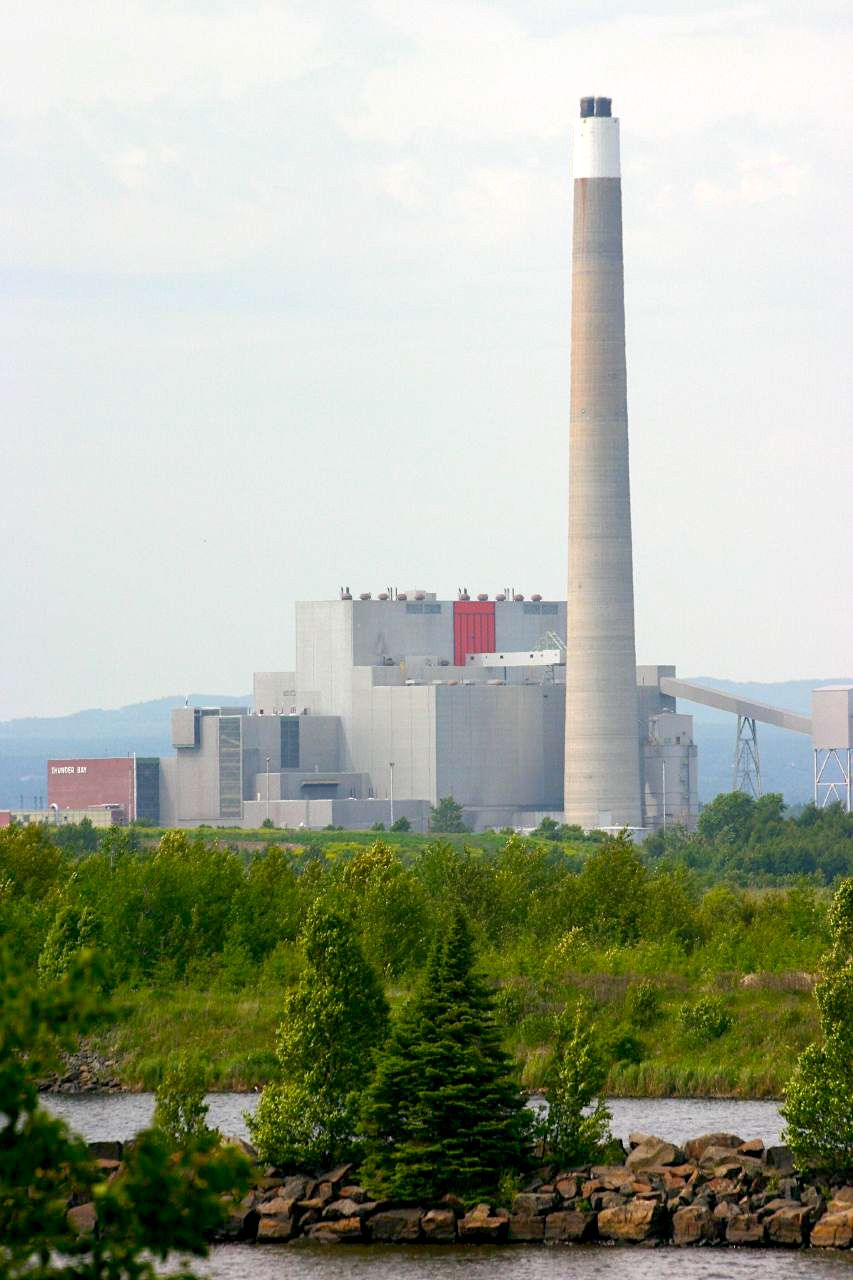
- The Thunder Bay Generating Station
- Country: Canada
- Location: Thunder Bay, Ontario
- Coordinates: 48°21′36″N 89°13′12″W
- Status: Decommissioned
- Commission date: 1963 (coal); 2015 (biomass)
- Decommission date: 2018
- Owner: Ontario Power Generation

Thermal power station
- Primary fuel: Advanced biomass
- Turbine technology: Steam turbine

External links
- Commons: Related media on Commons

Thunder Bay Generating Station is a defunct biomass-fired thermal power station owned by Ontario Power Generation ("OPG"). It is located on Mission Island in Thunder Bay, on the shore of Lake Superior.

Thunder Bay GS was in operation from 1963 to 2018. It was the last coal fired station in Ontario. The plant was initially shut down in April 2014 as part of Ontario's phase-out of coal-fired electricity generation, before being converted to run on advanced biomass (wood pellets) and recommissioned on February 9, 2015.

== Historic operations ==
Thunder Bay GS began operation in 1963, with one 100 MW coal-fuelled generating unit. Two additional coal-fuelled units were added in the early 1980s, and in 1984 the original 100 MW unit was removed from service. This plant is connected to the power grid via 115 kV and 230 kV transmission lines. The station occupies 53 ha (131 acres) on Mission Island, at the mouth of the Kaministiquia River delta on Thunder Bay. The plant's main chimney was 198 m (650 ft) tall. The stack was demolished on September 9, 2021.

The two coal-fuelled boilers provided a peak output of 326 MW fuelled by low-sulfur lignite coal from the Ravenscrag Formation in Southern Saskatchewan and low-sulfur sub-bituminous coal from the Powder River Basin in the United States.

While operating as a coal plant, annual production was approximately 1.5 billion kilowatt-hours (kWh), enough energy to supply over 100,000 households for one year.

== Conversion from coal ==
There were multiple announcements on the future of Thunder Bay GS over 10 years. The Ontario government initially proposed conversion to natural gas in 2004 but subsequently canceled that plan in 2006.

Then, as part of the 2010 Long-Term Energy Plan, Ontario's Ministry of Energy announced that Thunder Bay GS would be converted from coal to natural gas by the end of 2014. This was part of the Ontario government's commitment to phase out all of its coal-burning power generation.

On November 1, 2012, OPG announced that the Ontario Power Authority requested that the conversion to natural gas be suspended until the Ontario Power Authority could assess generating needs in northwestern Ontario. The next announcement on the generating station's fate was made in November 2013 when the Ministry of Energy announced that Thunder Bay GS would be converted to advanced biomass.

Ontario's Minister of Energy Bob Chiarelli outlined the broad terms of the conversion in a directive to the Ontario Power Authority dated December 16, 2013. Chiarelli noted that the station will have only one unit operating as a peaking plant and that OPG is only permitted to purchase 15,000 tonnes of fuel annually. It was estimated that the 15,000 tonnes of fuel would permit the single unit to operate at 2% of capacity. A five-year contract was in place for the generating station to produce electricity beginning in January 2015.

As of 2015, the plant burns steam-treated wood pellets (biocoal) from Arbaflame in Norway.

On July 27, 2018, OPG and IESO announced the closure of Thunder Bay Generating Station due to a leak in the boiler causing the station to be shut down since May 2017. Estimated repair costs would be about $5 million and the contract expiration in 2020 was not intended to be renewed.

In 2021, demolition began on the generation station by the Hamilton-based company, Budget Demolition. The work was expected to take two to three years and the majority of the materials was recycled. The 650-foot chimney came down in a controlled demolition on 9 September 2021 and was captured on video on YouTube.

== Emissions ==
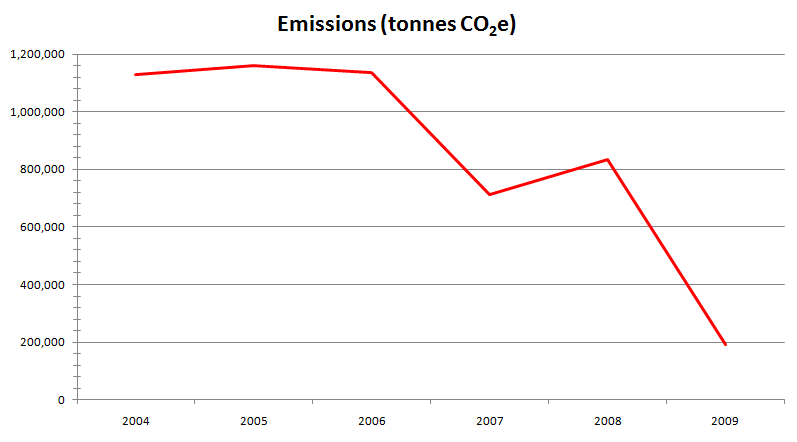
Emissions from Thunder Bay Generation Station from 2004 to 2009.

The Thunder Bay Generating Station was ranked within the top 200 facility emitters, according to Environment Canada.

Greenhouse Gases (2010)
Greenhouse gas	Sum (tonnes)	Sum (tonnes CO_{2}e*)
CO_{2}	264,950.63	264,951
CH_{4}	3.86	81
N_{2}O	4.75	1,472
Total	-	266,504

*Calculated figures for CO_{2}e are rounded to the nearest tonne.

Total emissions, 2004-2010
Year	Emissions (tonnes CO_{2}e)
2004	1,128,341
2005	1,159,003
2006	1,137,327
2007	712,571
2008	832,868
2009	190,366
2010	266,504

== See also ==
- Atikokan Generating Station
- Kakabeka Generating Station
- List of power stations in Canada
