= Wiegand River =

- Location of the mouth of the Wiegand River in Ontario

Location
- Country: Canada
- Province: Ontario
- Region: Northeastern Ontario
- District: Thunder Bay

Physical characteristics
- Source: Adrian Lake
  - location: Adrian Township
  - coordinates: 48°27′22″N 89°49′22″W
  - elevation: 518 m (1,699 ft)
- Mouth: Matawin River
  - location: Horne Township
  - coordinates: 48°33′02″N 89°50′46″W
  - elevation: 367 m (1,204 ft)

Basin features
- River system: Great Lakes Basin

The Wiegand River is a river in Thunder Bay District in Northwestern Ontario, Canada. It is in the Great Lakes Basin and is a right tributary of the Matawin River.

The river begins at Adrian Lake in geographic AdrianTownship, and heads northwest. It turns northeast, enters geographic Horne Township, and reaches its mouth at the Matawin River. The Matawin River flows via the Kaministiquia River to Lake Superior.

== See also ==
- List of rivers of Ontario

== Sources ==
- Map 13 (PDF) (Map). 1 : 1,600,000. Official road map of Ontario. Ministry of Transportation of Ontario. 2014.
- Restructured municipalities - Ontario map #2 (Map). Restructuring Maps of Ontario. Ontario Ministry of Municipal Affairs and Housing. 2006. Archived from the original on 2014-04-10.
