= Ontario Power Generation =

Electric utility company in Canada

Ontario Power Generation Inc.
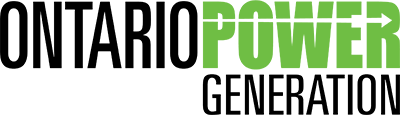
- Type: Crown corporation
- Industry: Electricity generation
- Founded: 1999
- Headquarters: 1908 Colonel Sam Drive, Oshawa, Ontario
- Key people: Wendy Kei, Chair; Nicolle Butcher, President and CEO
- Products: Electricity
- Revenue: ▲$5.53 billion CAD (2018)
- Net income: ▲$1.20 billion CAD (2018)
- Owner: Government of Ontario
- Number of employees: 10,000 (2019)
- Subsidiaries: Atura Power; Canadian Nuclear Partners Inc. Eagle Creek Renewable Energy; Ivy Charging Network; Laurentis Energy Partners; PowerON
- Website: opg.com

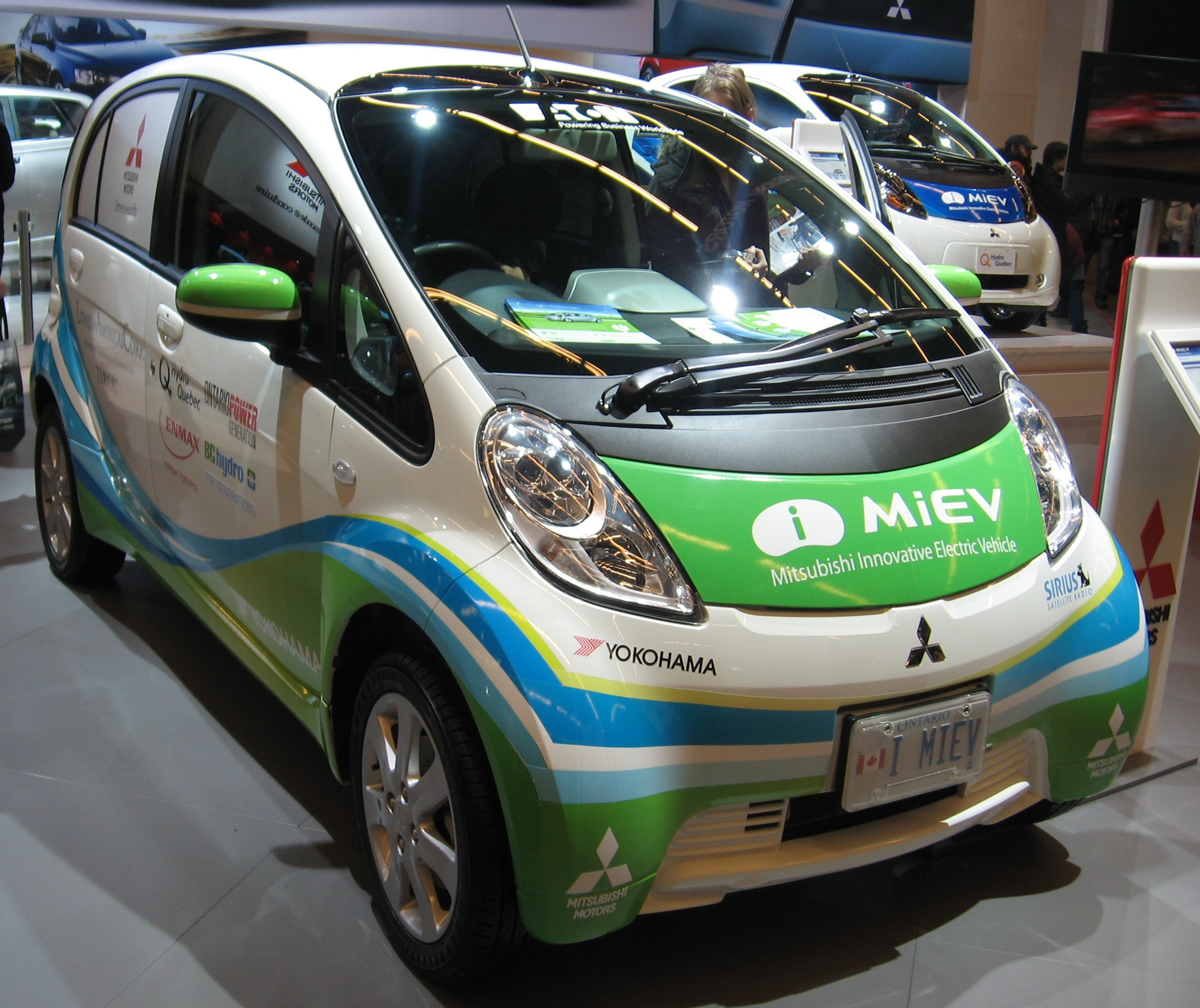
A Mitsubishi i-MiEV from the 2011 Montreal International Auto Show showing the hydro companies of Canada for Ontario Power Generation, Hydro-Québec, BC Hydro and others

Ontario Power Generation Inc. (OPG) is a Crown corporation and "government business enterprise" that is responsible for approximately half of the electricity generation in the province of Ontario, Canada. It is wholly owned by the government of Ontario. Sources of electricity include nuclear, hydroelectric, wind, gas and biomass. Although Ontario has an open electricity market, the provincial government, as OPG's sole shareholder, regulates the price the company receives for its electricity to be less than the market average, in an attempt to stabilize prices. Since 1 April 2008, the company's rates have been regulated by the Ontario Energy Board.

In June 2019, it was announced that a new corporate campus would be built in Clarington, Ontario, that will also house Ontario Power Generation's headquarters. In February 2023, it was announced that OPG would instead purchase the former head office building of General Motors Canada at 1908 Colonel Sam Drive in Oshawa, Ontario, for their new headquarters, planning to open by 2024, but full occupancy is now by end of 2025.

== Establishment ==
Ontario Power Generation was established in April 1999 as part of plans by the Progressive Conservative government of Premier Mike Harris to privatize the assets of Ontario Hydro and deregulate the province's electricity market. OPG was one of the five successor corporations to Ontario Hydro and assumed ownership of all generating stations.

== Board of directors ==
Wendy Kei is the chair of the board of directors. She was appointed as chairman on 27 June 2019.

Nicolle Butcher is the president and chief executive officer of OPG. She was appointed to this position on 19 December 2024, when the previous president and CEO, Ken Hartwick, resigned.

Other current members of the board include John Herron, Selma Lussenburg, Scott McDonald, Jill Pepall, Jim Reinsch, James Sheppard, Anju Virmani, Tracy Primeau and Mary Filipelli.

== Finances ==
The financial situation at Ontario Power Generation has improved significantly since 2003. Its profits for 2005 were $366 million, and its credit rating was upgraded. In July 2006, Liberal Energy Minister Dwight Duncan described OPG's turnaround as "[o]ne of the untold stories of the last two years".

On the local public relations side, OPG has won many awards for its performance as a "good corporate citizen". Most recently, OPG was named for the fourth year in a row to the Corporate Knights Top 50 Best Corporate Citizens in Canada. OPG regularly sponsors community events across the province and houses wildlife trails in the exclusion zones around its nuclear stations in Durham Region. The company's annual employee charity campaign has raised millions of dollars for charities across Ontario. In October 2008, OPG was named one of "Canada's Top 100 Employers" by Mediacorp Canada Inc., and was featured in Maclean's. Later that month, OPG was also named one of Greater Toronto's Top Employers, which was announced by the Toronto Star.

OPG regularly reports on its operational, safety and environmental record. The company publishes quarterly reports summarizing its performance in these areas.

OPG purchased 9 million shares (1.5%) of former Crown corporation Hydro One, another Ontario Hydro successor company, in April 2016.

== Nuclear power ==
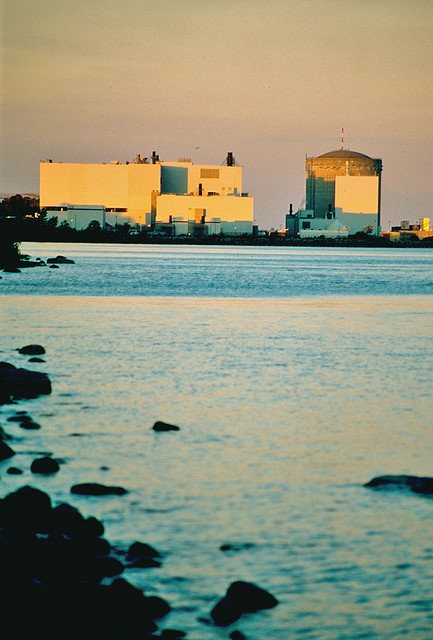
The Darlington Nuclear Generating Station, on the shores of Lake Ontario in Clarington.

OPG is the owner of four nuclear power plants. It directly operates Pickering Nuclear Generation Station in Pickering, Ontario and Darlington Nuclear Generating Station in Courtice, Ontario. OPG also owns the two nuclear power plants that make up the Bruce Nuclear Generating Station on Lake Huron in western Ontario, which are operated by Bruce Power under a long-term lease.

=== Waste ===
OPG also operates three facilities for the interim management of nuclear waste generated by OPG's 10 nuclear reactors and Bruce Power's eight nuclear reactors. The company is proposing to construct and operate a deep geologic repository (DGR) on the Bruce Nuclear site, adjacent to its present Western Waste Management Facility. The repository would provide permanent storage of low- and intermediate-level radioactive waste produced from the operation of the Bruce, Pickering, and Darlington nuclear generating stations. In 2005, OPG initiated the regulatory approval process.

Following a comprehensive environmental assessment (EA) process and two rounds of public hearings in front of a federal joint review panel (JRP), on 6 May 2015 the JRP issued the EA Report and recommended the approval of OPG's DGR to the federal government.

In February 2016, the Federal Minister of the Environment and Climate Change delayed a decision on OPG's DGR, causing a pause in the timeline for the EA decision to be issued. While the JRP had recommended to the federal government the project move forward based on the strong technical safety case, the Minister requested OPG provide further information. OPG has committed to provide the requested studies and additional information by the end of 2016.

=== New build at Darlington plant ===
OPG has also begun the process of building up to four new nuclear units at the site of its Darlington Nuclear Generating Station but in October 2013, the province of Ontario declared that the Darlington new build project would not be part of Ontario's long-term energy plan, citing the high capital cost estimates and energy surplus in the province at the time of the announcement.

=== Commercial operations in Pickering ===
In January 2016, the province of Ontario approved plans to pursue continued operation of the Pickering Nuclear Generating Station to 2024.

OPG will work with the Ministry of Energy, the Independent Electricity System Operator and the Ontario Energy Board to pursue continued operation of the Pickering Station to 2024. All six units would operate until 2022; two units would then shut down and four units would operate to 2024. Extending Pickering's operation will ensure a reliable, clean source of base load electricity during refurbishment of the Darlington Nuclear Generating Station and the initial Bruce Nuclear refurbishments.

Previous logo until 2019. The word "POWER" is colored red.

Any plan to extend Pickering's life requires approval from the Canadian Nuclear Safety Commission (CNSC). OPG is currently working on a licence application to the CNSC for approval in 2018.

On 2 December 2021, OPG announced a partnership with GE Vernova Hitachi Nuclear Energy to deploy a small modular reactor (SMR) at the Darlington new nuclear site, the only site in Canada currently licensed for a new nuclear build. The project is expected to be completed as early as 2028.

== Renewable energy ==
OPG has made some investments in renewable electricity generation.

By 2014, OPG had stopped burning coal to generate electricity. Thermal electricity-generating stations were traditionally coal-fired, creating problems caused by pollution. While the Nanticoke Generating Station, on Lake Erie in Haldimand County, Ontario, and the Lambton Generating Station were shut down, OPG did convert two other coal-fuelled power plants. Atikokan Generating Station in Atikokan, Ontario, was converted in 2012 to burning steam-treated wood pellets or "biomass" as OPG refers to it. "Biomass wood pellets are a sustainable fuel recognized as beneficial to climate change mitigation, as identified in the Biomass Sustainability Analysis Report by the Pembina Institute", according to OPG. The company says that this generating station is "North America's largest 100 per cent biomass-fuelled power plant". Thunder Bay Generating Station in Thunder Bay, Ontario, was converted to using "advanced" biomass in 2014. "It is a solid biomass fuel ... has higher energy density and is hydrophobic (repels water) allowing it to withstand the elements while being stored outside," according to OPG.

In March 2016, OPG and partners SunEdison Canadian Construction LP and Six Nations Development Corporation were selected by the Independent Electricity System Operator (IESO) to develop the Nanticoke Solar Facility, a 44 megawatt (MW) solar farm on and near the Nanticoke Generating Station site on Lake Erie.

The company claimed on 18 June 2016, that they possess "a diverse fleet that includes 65 hydroelectric stations and two nuclear stations", boasting that, "OPG's power is more than 99 per cent free of smog and greenhouse gas emissions."

== Controversies and criticism ==
Prior to shutting down its coal-fueled generating stations, OPG attracted considerable controversy for the operation of coal-fired generating stations, which ranked among Canada's largest individual air pollution sources. This was mostly because Nanticoke housed a massive 3,900 MW of generation capacity in one site: it produced "the most pollution in one site" despite being a reasonably clean plant per megawatt of power. Nanticoke Generating Station was North America's largest coal-fired generating station and the single largest air pollution source for southern Ontario and northern New York state, attracting considerable criticism from environmentalists and legislators in both jurisdictions. OPG's Lambton Generating Station was the second largest air polluter in the province. The Liberal government of Dalton McGuinty came to power in 2003 with a promise to phase out coal generation by 2007. However, for various operational and demand reasons this was not possible until 2014, when the last coal was burned in OPG's stations.

The company also endured significant criticism concerning the slow return to operation of some of its nuclear generating stations which had been shut down by the Northeast blackout of 2003. The problem was that all but one of the reactors were tripped and allowed to poison out, preventing an early reconnection to the electricity grid. Once shut down, all nuclear reactors take several days to return to service.

Another source of criticism was the extended and expensive refit to the reactor Unit 4 at the Pickering A Nuclear Station. In late 2003, the incoming Liberal government fired the three most senior executives at OPG on the heels of a report that the retrofit of a single reactor at the Pickering nuclear plant had come in significantly over budget and three years behind schedule. The government also accepted the resignation of all remaining board members. Management underestimated the amount of work and complexity of the Unit 4 refurbishment project and failed to do a complete scope analysis before starting on the project. Due to the uproar over the large cost overruns and delays, an independent review committee was commissioned to examine the future role of OPG in the electricity sector; the future structure of OPG; the appropriate corporate governance and senior management structure; and the potential refurbishing of Pickering A Units 1, 2, and 3. Former federal Finance Minister and Deputy Prime Minister John Manley chaired the review committee. Peter Godsoe, Chairman of the Bank of Nova Scotia, and Jake Epp, a former federal Cabinet Minister, Chair of the Pickering A Review Panel, and interim Chairman of OPG, also sat on the committee.

The experience of refurbishing Pickering A Unit 1 was significantly different with a much tighter adherence to schedule and budget. Unit 1 was returned to service in November 2005 providing 542 MW of generating capacity for Ontario's electricity system. It was decided that Pickering Units 2 and 3 would not be restarted as the business case could not be made.

In early December 2015, Ontario's Auditor General pointed out that OPG was importing wood products from Europe to burn at the Thunder Bay station "pushing the cost of the electricity it generates to 25 times higher than other biomass generators", or $1,600 per MWh. Subsequently, Ontario's Development and Mines Minister Michael Gravelle stated that OPG was seeking a local company to produce the biomass fuel.

Considering the ever-increasing cost of electricity to Ontario consumers, the hiring of CEO Jeffrey Lyash in the summer of 2015 created some criticism when it was revealed that Lyash would earn $775,000 per annum and that could increase to $1.55 million with bonuses if performance targets are met.

== Headquarters ==
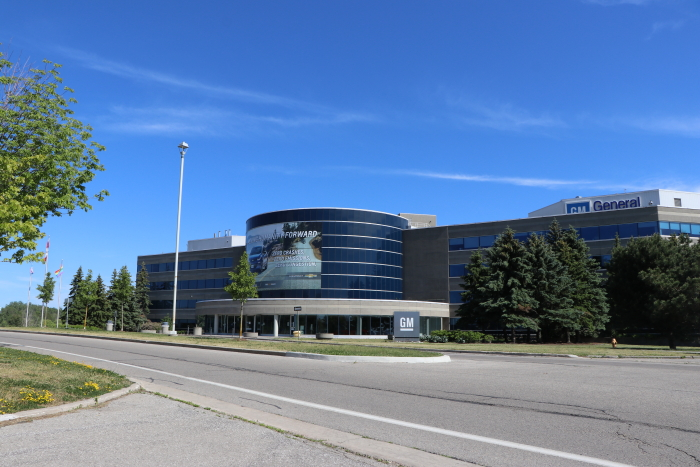
The former GM Canada HQ in Oshawa, to serve as new OPG headquarters.

On 10 June 2019, it was announced that a new corporate campus would be built in Clarington, Ontario, that will also house Ontario Power Generation's headquarters.

On 13 February 2023, OPG announced they completed a deal to purchase the former head office building for General Motors of Canada in Oshawa, Ontario, for their new headquarters, with plans to open in 2024. Original plans called for a new building to be constructed in Clarington, Ontario, at the existing Darlington Energy Complex. The decision was made to retrofit the empty building for economic and sustainability reasons. Clarington Mayor Adrian Foster issued a statement, saying he was "deeply disappointed" with the decision not to build in Clarington. Oshawa Mayor Dan Carter welcomed the news, saying he was "thrilled to welcome" OPG to Oshawa.

== Power plants ==
OPG owns and operates generating plants that draw from nuclear, hydro-electric, combined gas, biomass, solar and some wind. In 2018, it generated about half of the electricity in Ontario or 74.0 terawatt hours (TWh).

OPG power stations — capacity and output (2018)
Source	Stations	Capacity (MW)	2015 output (TWh)
Nuclear	2	5,728	40.9
Hydroelectric	66	7,480	29.8
Thermal	3	2,305	2.5
Biomass	1	205	0.0
Wind	1	7	0.0
Solar	1	44	0.0
Total	74	16,295	74

Roughly 60 percent of Ontario's electricity is accounted for by three nuclear power plants: Pickering, Darlington and Bruce. No fatal accidents related to nuclear power have occurred in Ontario.

OPG power stations
Nuclear	Hydro-electric	Thermal	Wind
Pickering (3,100 MW – 6 CANDU Reactors) – Pickering, Ontario; Darlington (3,512 MW current – 4 CANDU reactors) – Courtice, Ontario; Bruce (6,288 MW - 8 CANDU reactors) - Kincardine, Ontario	Large: DeCew Falls 1 (Twelve Mile Creek); Decew Falls 2 (Twelve Mile Creek); Ontario Power (retired) (Niagara River) – Niagara Falls, Ontario; Sir Adam Beck (2,100 MW); Sir Adam Beck 1 (Niagara River); Sir Adam Beck 2 (Niagara River); Sir Adam Beck Pump-Generating Station (Niagara River) – Niagara Falls, Ontario; Abitibi Canyon Generating Station (Abitibi River); Harmon (Mattagami River); Hound Chute (Montreal River); Indian Chute (Montreal River); Kipling (Mattagami River); Lac Seul (English River); Little Long (Mattagami River); Lower Notch (Montreal River); Lower Sturgeon Falls (Mattagami River); Matabitchuan (Matabitchuan River); Otter Rapids Generating Station (Abitibi River); Sandy Falls Mattagami River; Smoky Falls (Mattagami River); Wawaitin Falls (Mattagami River); Aguasabon (Aguasabon River); Alexander Falls (Nipigon River); Cameron Falls (Nipigon River); Caribou Falls (English River); Ear Falls (English River); Kakabeka (Kaministiquia River); Manitou Falls (English River); Pine Portage (Nipigon River); Silver Falls (Dog River); Whitedog Falls (Winnipeg River); Arnprior (Madawaska River); Barrett Chute (Madawaska River); Calabogie (Madawaska River); Chats Falls (Ottawa River); Chenaux (Ottawa River); Des Joachims (Ottawa River); Mountain Chute (Madawaska River); Otto Holden (Ottawa River); R.H. Saunders (St. Lawrence River) (968 MW); Stewartville (Madawaska River); Small: Auburn (Otonabee River); Big Chute (Severn River); Big Eddy (Musquash River); Ragged Rapids (Musquash River); Hannah Chute (Muskoka River); South Falls (Muskoka River); Tretheweys Falls (Muskoka River); Bingham Chute (South River); Coniston (Wanapitei River); Crystal Falls (Sturgeon R); Ranney Falls (Trent River (Ontario)); Healey Falls (Trent River (Ontario)); Meyersburg (Trent River (Ontario)); Frankford (Trent River (Ontario)); Sidney (Trent River (Ontario)); Eugenia Falls (Beaver River); Altogether there are 29 plants producing 127 MW of power.	Atikokan (211 MW biomass; converted from coal) in Atikokan; Brighton Beach (580 MW natural gas) in Windsor.; Halton Hills (580 MW natural gas) in Halton Hills.; Lennox (2,140 MW oil/natural gas) in Greater Napanee.; Napanee (900 MW natural gas) in Greater Napanee.; Portlands Energy Centre (562 MW natural gas) in Toronto.; Defunct: Hearn (1,200 MW coal; partially converted to natural gas) in Toronto; shut down; Lakeview (2,400 MW coal) in Mississauga; demolished; Lambton (950 MW coal) in St. Clair Township; shut down; Nanticoke (2,760 MW coal) in Haldimand County; shut down; Thunder Bay (306 MW formerly coal; converted to advanced biomass) in Thunder Bay; shut down	1 wind turbine at Pickering (7 MW)

On 25 June 2019, Ontario Power announced the $1.12 billion purchase of Cube Hydro, which includes 19 hydroelectric power plants in New York, Pennsylvania, Virginia, West Virginia and North Carolina.

== Gallery ==
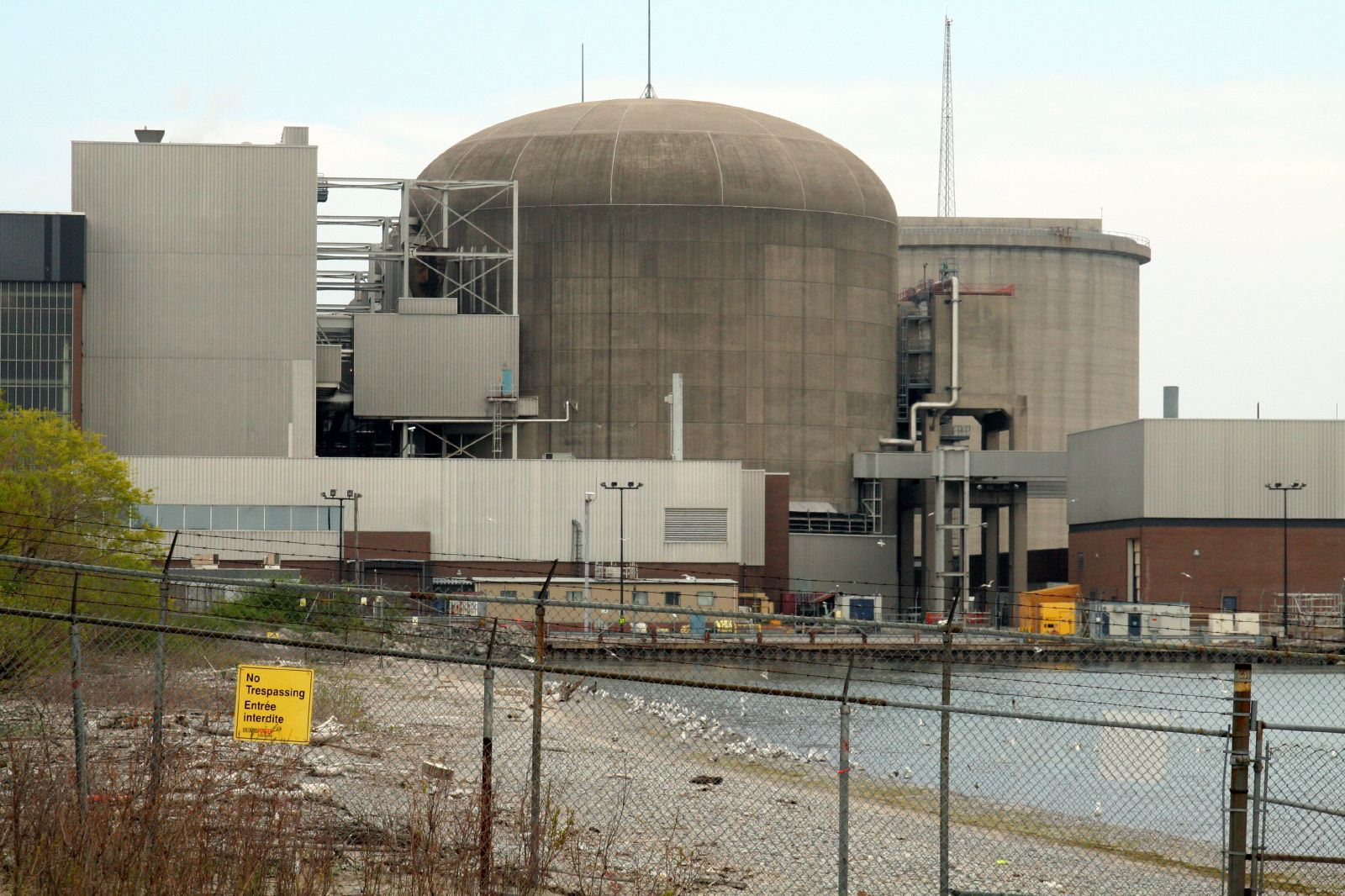
The Pickering Nuclear Generating Station

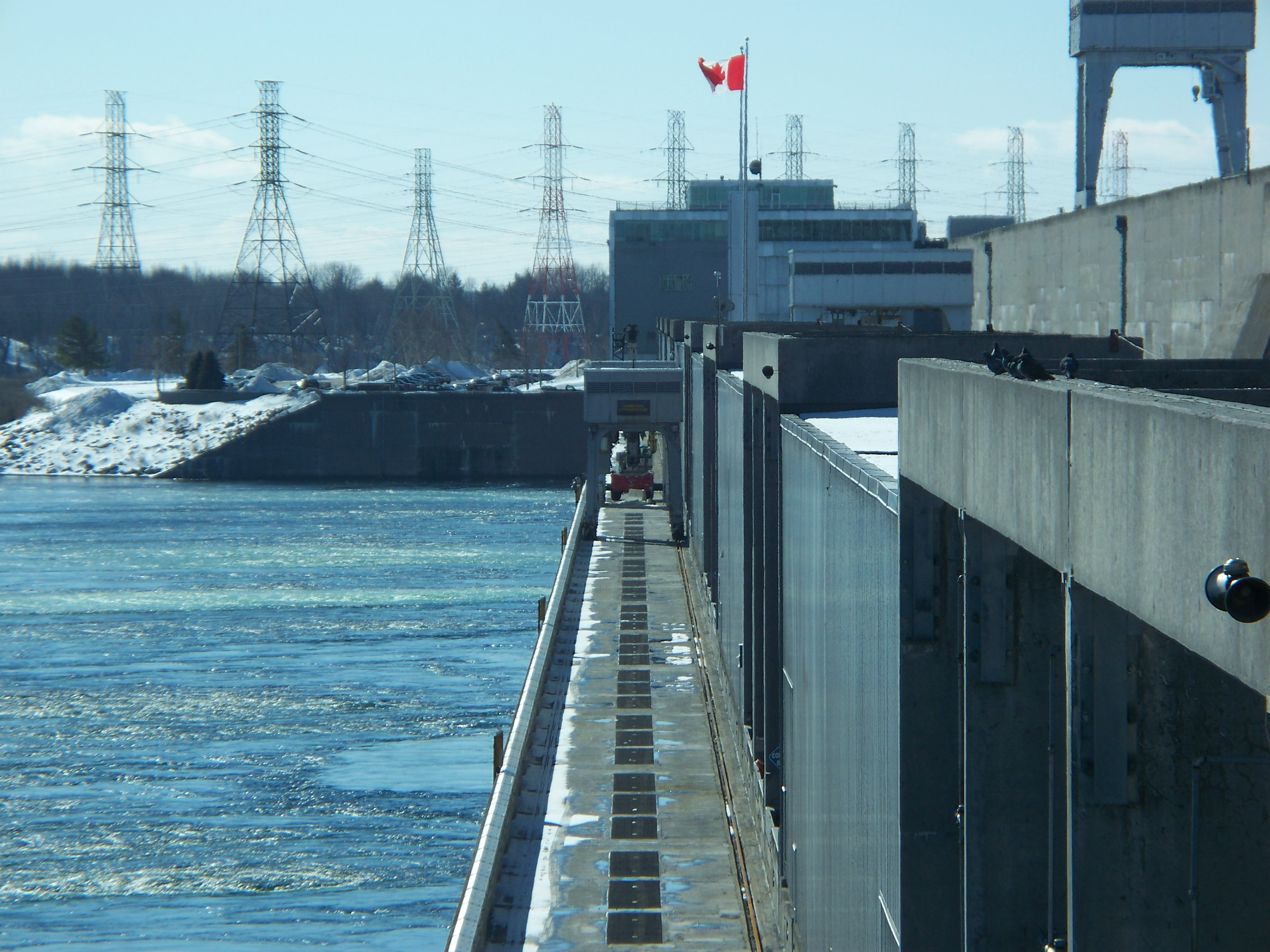
The 1045-MW R. H. Saunders Generating Station, on the Saint Lawrence River

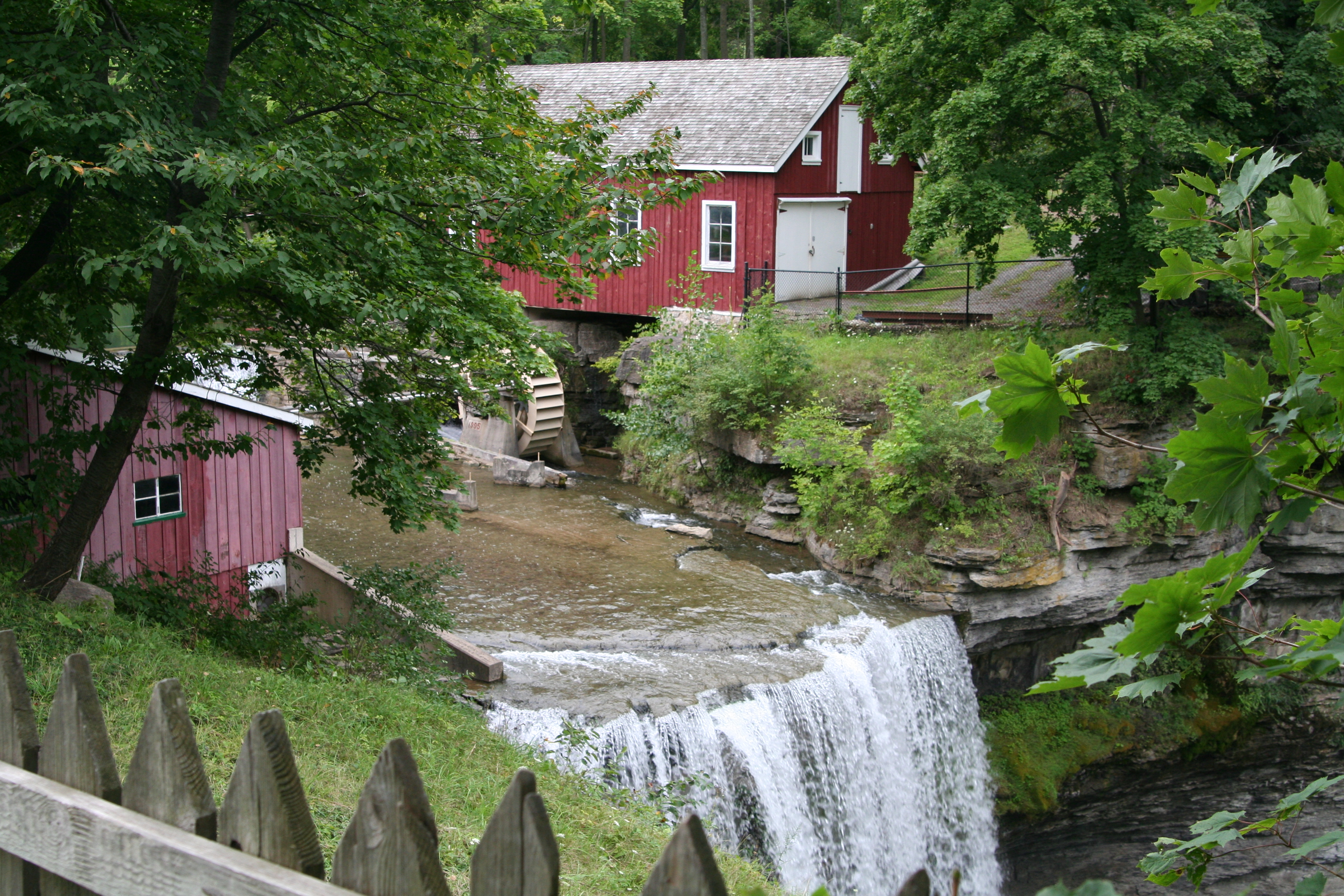
The old water mill at Decew Falls

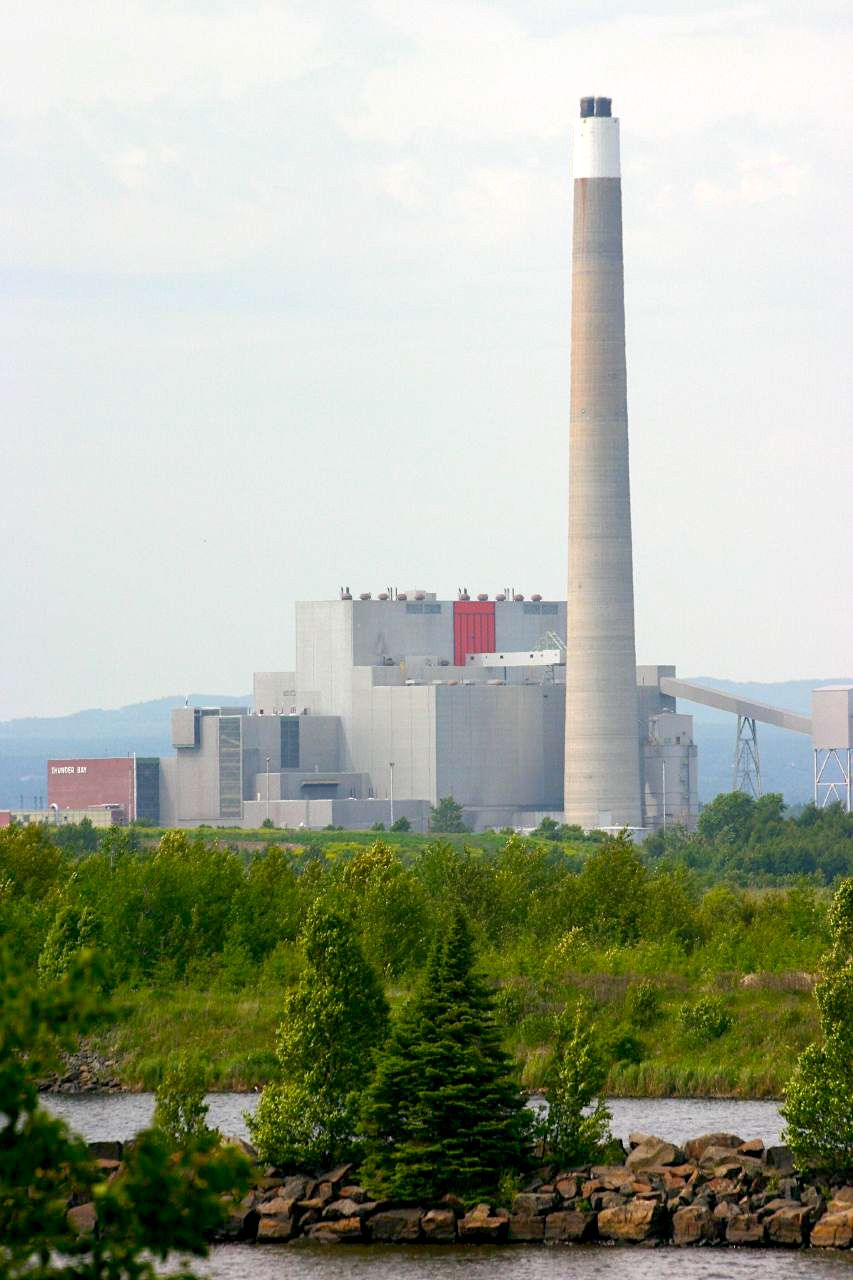
OPG's Thunder Bay Generating Station

== See also ==
- Renewable energy in Canada
- Hydro Ottawa
