= Swamp River =

Swamp River may refer to:

Canada

- In British Columbia, the portion of the Cariboo River above Cariboo Lake formerly known as the Swamp River
- Swamp River (Ontario), in Thunder Bay District
