= Raith, Ontario =

Raith
- dispersed rural community unincorporated area
- Location in Ontario
- Coordinates: 48°49′19″N 89°55′09″W
- Country: Canada
- Province: Ontario
- District: Thunder Bay
- Geographic township: Golding
- Elevation: 488 m (1,601 ft)
- Time zone: UTC-5 (Eastern Time Zone)
  - Summer (DST): UTC-4 (Eastern Time Zone)
- Postal Code: P0T
- Area code: 807

Raith is a dispersed rural community and unincorporated area in geographic Golding Township in the Unorganized Part of Thunder Bay District in Northwestern Ontario, Canada.

== Geography ==
The community lies at the watershed divide between the Great Lakes Basin/Saint Lawrence River drainage basin and the Hudson Bay drainage basin, a fact highlighted by an Ontario Heritage Trust Blue Plaque. The Oskondaga River, on the Great Lakes basin side of the divide, begins at Raith.

== Transportation ==
The community is Ontario Highway 17, at this point part of the Trans-Canada Highway, between Upsala to the northwest and Shabaqua Corners to the south. There are also two railway lines: the Canadian Pacific Railway transcontinental main line, in operation; and the Canadian National Railway Graham Subdivision main line, originally built as part of the National Transcontinental Railway, now abandoned.
