= Atikokan Generating Station =

Biomass power station in Ontario, Canada

- Country: Canada
- Location: Atikokan, Ontario
- Coordinates: 48°50′17″N 91°34′15″W
- Status: Operational
- Commission date: 1985 (coal-fired); 2014 (biomass-fired)
- Owner: Ontario Power Generation

Thermal power station
- Primary fuel: Wood biomass (2014)
- Turbine technology: Steam turbine

Power generation
- Nameplate capacity: 205 MW

Atikokan Generating Station is a biomass power plant owned by Ontario Power Generation (OPG) located 8 km (5 mi) north of Atikokan, Ontario (190 km (118 mi) west of Thunder Bay). The plant employs 90 people. The Atikokan Generating Station began operation as a coal fired station in 1985 and underwent an overhaul in the autumn of 2003.

Until 2012, it had one coal-fueled generating unit with low nitrogen oxide (NOx) burners, providing a peak output of 230 MW fuelled by low-sulfur lignite coal from the Ravenscrag Formation in Southern Saskatchewan.

In late 2012, the facility powered down and underwent renovations, due to the Ontario government's initiative to eliminate all coal-fired electricity generation. It is the first generating station to be converted by OPG to be fueled by biomass, and is North America's largest purely biomass-fueled power plant. The conversion came at a cost of C$200 million, and the plant was re-opened on 10 September 2014.

Annual production at the plant is approximately 900 million kilowatt-hours (kWh), enough energy to supply approximately 70,000 households for one year. The station occupies an area of 300 ha (741 acres). The plant's chimney is 145 m (476 ft) tall, and the steam temperature is 538 °C (1,000 °F). This plant is connected to the provincial power grid via several 230,000-volt transmission lines.

== Emissions ==
Greenhouse Gases (2012)
Greenhouse gas	Sum (tonnes)	Sum (tonnes CO_{2}e*)
CO_{2}	46,684	46,684
CH_{4}	1.22	26
N_{2}O	0.92	286
Total	-	46,996

*Calculated figures for CO_{2}e are rounded to the nearest tonne.

Total emissions, 2004-2020
Year	Emissions (tonnes CO_{2}e)
2004	1,181,122
2005	1,108,437
2006	851,094
2007	754,148
2008	413,639
2009	200,393
2010	501,830
2011	78,078
2012	46,996
2013	0
2014	0
2015	48,070
2016	29,219
2017	18,138
2018	19,645
2019	17,022
2020	17,104

== See also ==
- Thunder Bay Generating Station
- Kakabeka Generating Station
- List of power stations in Canada
- List of tallest smokestacks in Canada
