= Swallow Lake (Matawin River) =

- Location in Ontario
- Location: Thunder Bay District, Ontario
- Coordinates: 48°27′19″N 90°19′10″W
- Type: Lake
- Part of: Great Lakes Basin
- Primary outflows: Matawin River
- Basin countries: Canada
- Max. length: 3.2 kilometres (2.0 mi)
- Max. width: 1.9 kilometres (1.2 mi)
- Surface elevation: 483 metres (1,585 ft)

Swallow Lake is a lake in the Unorganized Part of Thunder Bay District in Northwestern Ontario, Canada. It is in the Great Lakes Basin and is the source of the Matawin River. There are two unnamed inflows, at the southwest and east. The primary outflow, at the south, is the Matawin River, which flows via the Kaministiquia River to Lake Superior.
