= Shabaqua =

- dispersed rural community unincorporated area
- Location in Ontario
- Coordinates: 48°34′30″N 89°54′21″W
- Country: Canada
- Province: Ontario
- District: Thunder Bay
- Geographic township: Laurie
- Elevation: 397 m (1,302 ft)
- Time zone: UTC-5 (Eastern Time Zone)
  - Summer (DST): UTC-4 (Eastern Time Zone)
- Postal Code: P0T 1X0
- Area code: 807

Shabaqua is a dispersed rural community and unincorporated area in geographic Laurie Township in the Unorganized Part of Thunder Bay District in Northwestern Ontario, Canada. It is on the right bank of the Shebandowan River, as well as on a Canadian National Railway main line, built originally as the Canadian Northern Railway transcontinental main line, between Mabella to the west and Glenwater to the southeast.
