= Kakabeka Falls =

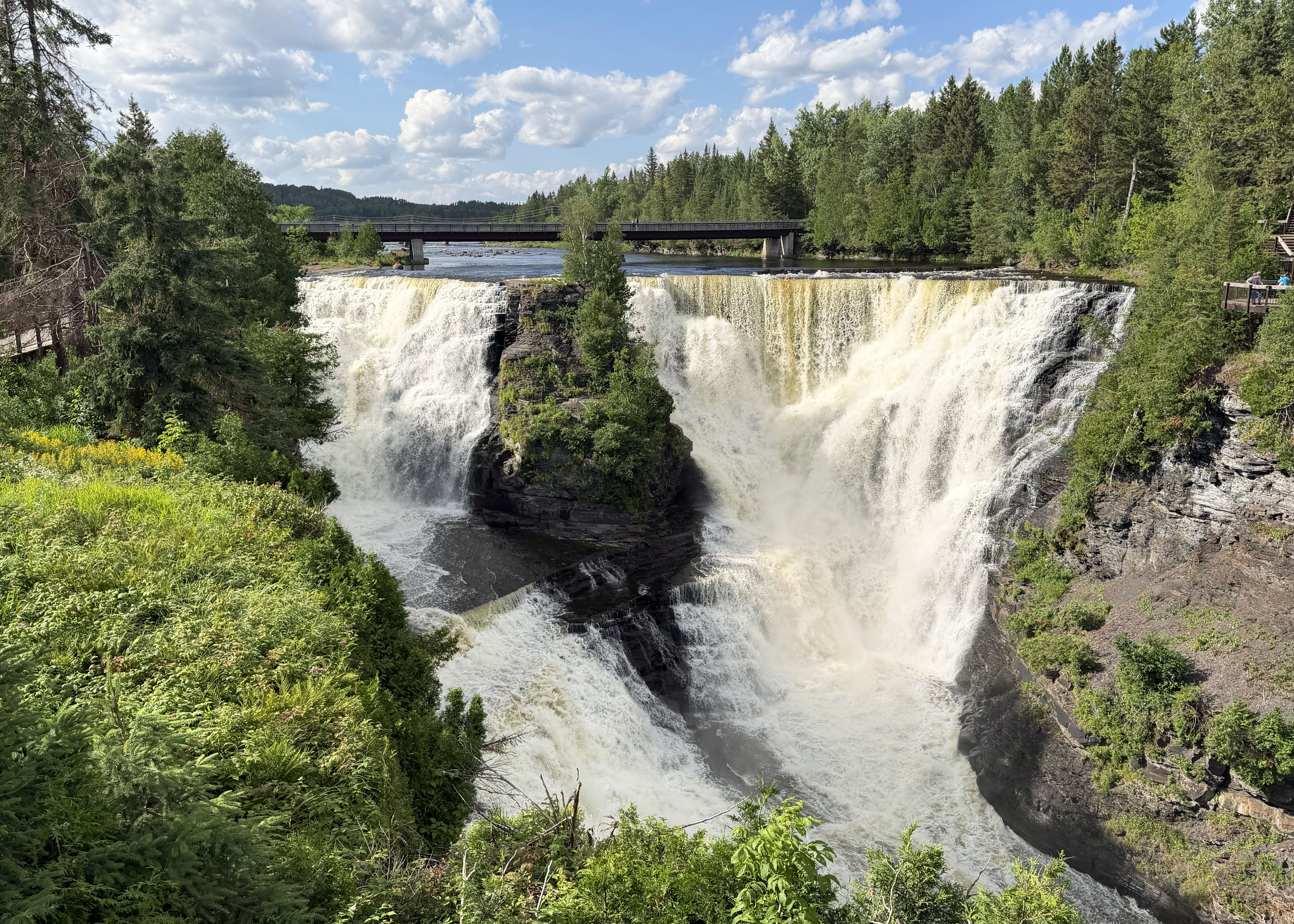
- Kakabeka Falls

- Location within Ontario
- Location: Oliver Paipoonge, Ontario, Canada
- Coordinates: 48°24′10″N 89°37′32″W
- Type: Plunge
- Total height: 40 m (130 ft)
- Number of drops: Two
- Watercourse: Kaministiquia River
- Average flow rate: 50 m^{3}/s (1766 cu ft/s)

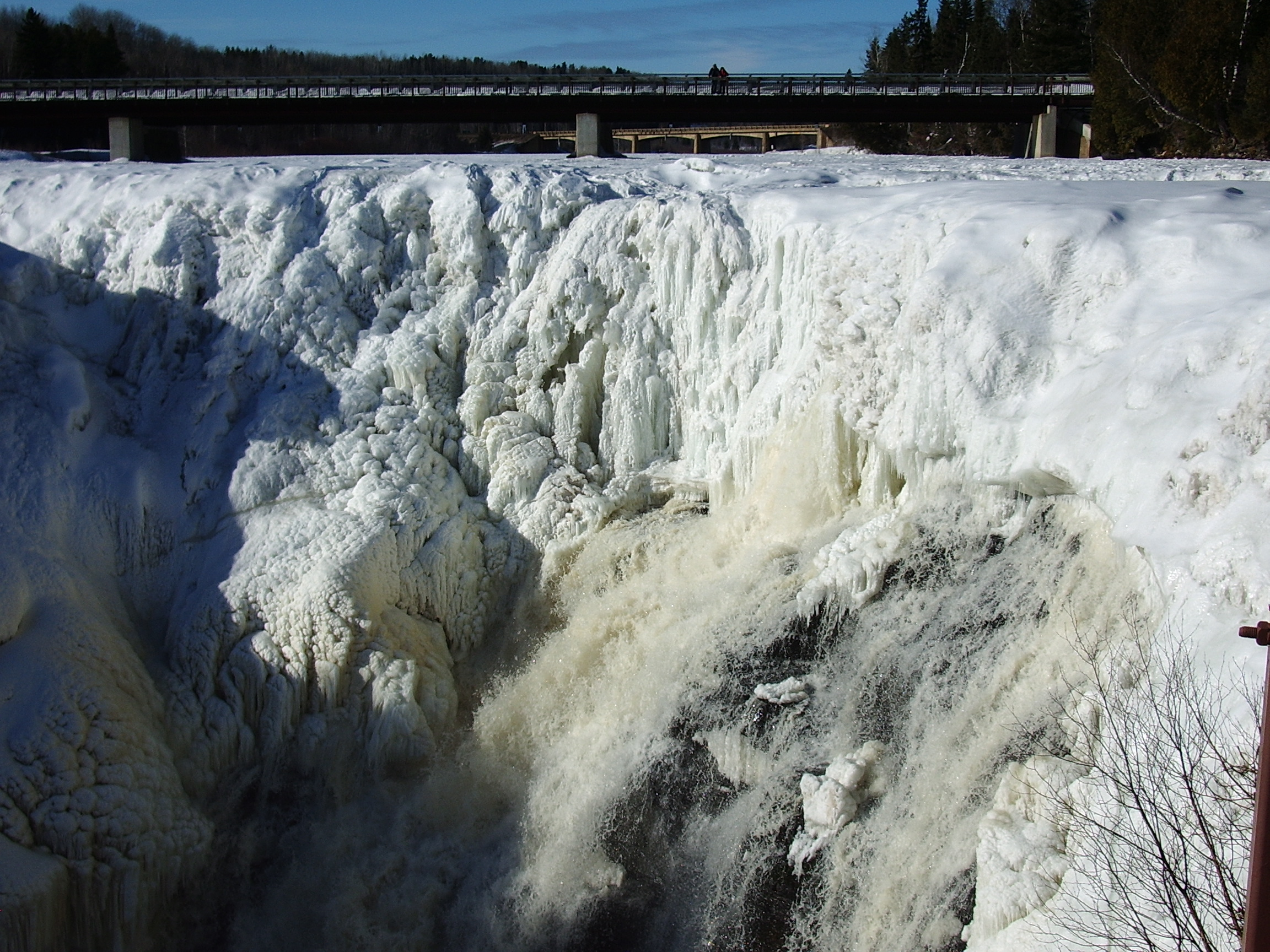
Frozen falls in February 2005.

Kakabeka Falls (/ˌkɛkəˈbɛkə/) is a waterfall on the Kaministiquia River, located beside the village of Kakabeka Falls in the municipality of Oliver Paipoonge, Ontario, 30 km (19 mi) west of the city of Thunder Bay.

The falls have a drop of 40 m (130 ft), cascading into a gorge carved out of the Precambrian Shield by meltwater following the Last Glacial Maximum. Because of its size and ease of access, it has been nicknamed "the Niagara of the North".

The rock face of the falls and the escarpments along the gorge are composed primarily of unstable shale, and are eroding. These rocks host sensitive flora, and contain some of the oldest fossils in existence, some 1.6 billion years of age. Due to the fragile rock, going into the gorge below the falls is prohibited.

The name "Kakabeka" comes from the Ojibwe word gakaabikaa "waterfall over a cliff" ([ˈɡəkaːˈbɪkaː]^{[help]}).

== Kakabeka Falls Provincial Park ==
Kakabeka Falls Provincial Park, established in 1955, covers 5 square kilometres (1.9 sq mi) and is managed by Ontario Parks. It surrounds the falls and extends along the Kaministiquia River, which was used centuries ago by voyageurs, who were the first Europeans to overwinter annually in northern Ontario. They used the Kaministiquia River as a major route to the northwest, with a 1.3 km (0.81 mi) mountain portage around the falls. A hotel with terrace which was once located on the edge of the gorge, was removed after the park's creation. It included a round restaurant that once overlooked the falls, and in winter would get covered in a thick layer of ice from the spray of the falls.

The park has two campgrounds with 169 campsites, 90 of which have electricity. The park maintains 17.9 km (11.1 mi) of hiking on six trails, and offers cross-country ski trails in the winter. A small Natural Heritage Education program is operated within the park in the summer, and offers daily interpretive programs, guided hikes, and a visitor centre.

== Legend of Green Mantle ==
The Legend of Green Mantle is about an Ojibwe chief who upon hearing news of an imminent attack from the Sioux tribe instructs his daughter, Princess Green Mantle, to devise a plan to protect her people. She enters the Sioux camp along the Kaministiquia River and, pretending to be lost, she bargains with them to spare her life if she will bring them to her father's camp. Placed at the head of the canoe, she instead leads herself and the Sioux warriors over the falls to their deaths, sparing her tribe from the attack. The legend claims that one can see Green Mantle when looking into the mist of Kakabeka Falls, a monument to the princess that gave her life to save her people. Other versions of the legend say she came across the Sioux herself, and later jumped out of the canoe ahead of the falls and swam to shore, leaving the Sioux to go over the falls, then ran back to the camp to warn her people.

== Kakabeka Falls in art ==
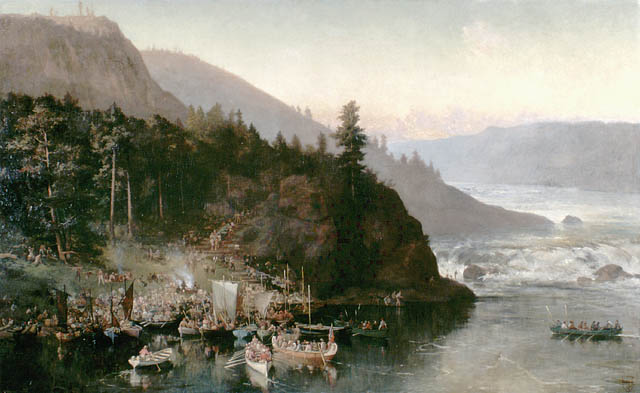
The Red River Expedition at Kakabeka Falls, Ontario by Frances Anne Hopkins, 1877.

The most famous painting featuring the falls, painted by Lucius Richard O'Brien in 1882, is held by the National Gallery of Canada.

Frances Anne Hopkins, whose historic paintings are well known for her portrayal of Canadian life, painted the portage around the falls in 1877. Her painting, "The Red River Expedition at Kakabeka Falls, Ontario", depicts the Red River Expedition of 1870 portaging around the falls on its way to the Red River Colony to interdict Louis Riel. Edward Roper also painted them. His Portage Below Kakabeka Falls, Kaministiquia River, Lake Superior (Peter Winkworth Collection of Canadiana. Library and Archives Canada, e000996335) is dated 1878.

== See also ==
- List of waterfalls
- List of waterfalls of Canada
- Kakabeka Generating Station
- Kaministiquia River
