= Dog Lake (Ontario) =

Lake in Thunder Bay District, Ontario, Canada

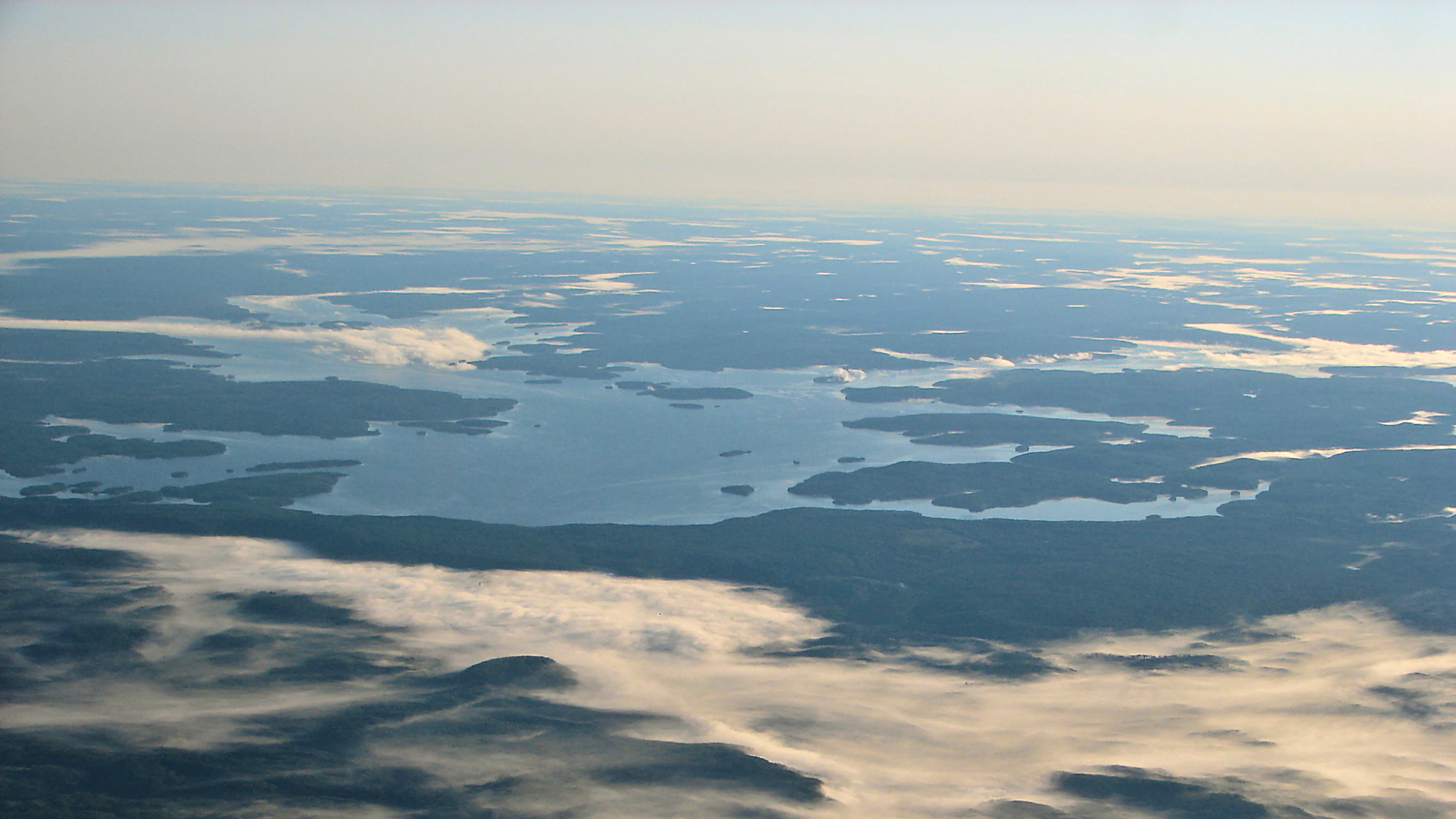
- Aerial view of Dog Lake from the south

- Location within Ontario
- Location: Ontario
- Coordinates: 48°44′35″N 89°32′10″W
- Primary inflows: Dog River
- Primary outflows: Kaministiquia River
- Basin countries: Canada

Dog Lake is a lake in northwestern Ontario, Canada which drains south through the Kaministiquia River to Thunder Bay on Lake Superior. It was on the voyageur route to western Canada. Its name comes from a large aboriginal effigy of a dog on a nearby hill. The lake is primarily fed by Dog River and seasonal melting of the snow. It includes Silver Falls Provincial Park and it is a back-up drinking water supply for the City of Thunder Bay. Development of new summer homes (locally referred to as "Camps") is not permitted. As such, properties on Dog Lake are in high demand when available and the body of water has little boat traffic unlike lakes in Southern Ontario.

Dog Lake is a dammed lake with regular rising and falling of water levels due to the hydro-electric dam.

It is common to find aboriginal artifacts in and around the lake. Most commonly found are copper arrow heads and pottery, at times. The lake can vary in depth and at its deepest point is approximately 400 feet.

== See also ==
- List of lakes in Ontario
