= Shabaqua Corners =

Community in Thunder Bay District, Ontario

- dispersed rural community unincorporated area
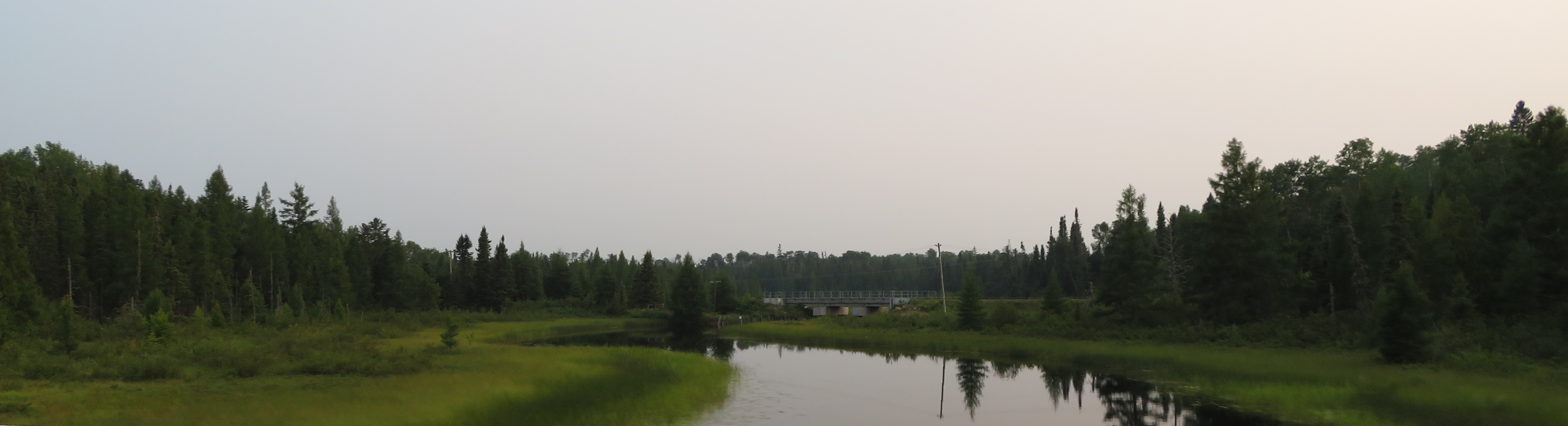

- Location in Ontario
- Coordinates: 48°35′37″N 89°53′16″W
- Country: Canada
- Province: Ontario
- District: Thunder Bay
- Geographic township: Dawson Road Lots
- Elevation: 427 m (1,401 ft)
- Time zone: UTC-5 (Eastern Time Zone)
  - Summer (DST): UTC-4 (Eastern Time Zone)
- Postal Code: P0T 1X0
- Area code: 807

Shabaqua Corners is a dispersed rural community and unincorporated area in geographic Dawson Road Lots Township in the Unorganized Part of Thunder Bay District in Northwestern Ontario, Canada. It is 56 kilometres (35 mi) west of Thunder Bay at the junction of Ontario Highway 17 and Ontario Highway 11; both highways at this point are part of the Trans-Canada Highway. There is an Ontario Provincial Police detachment in the community. The Oskondaga River flows through the community to its mouth at the Shebandowan River just to the south.
