= Shebandowan River =

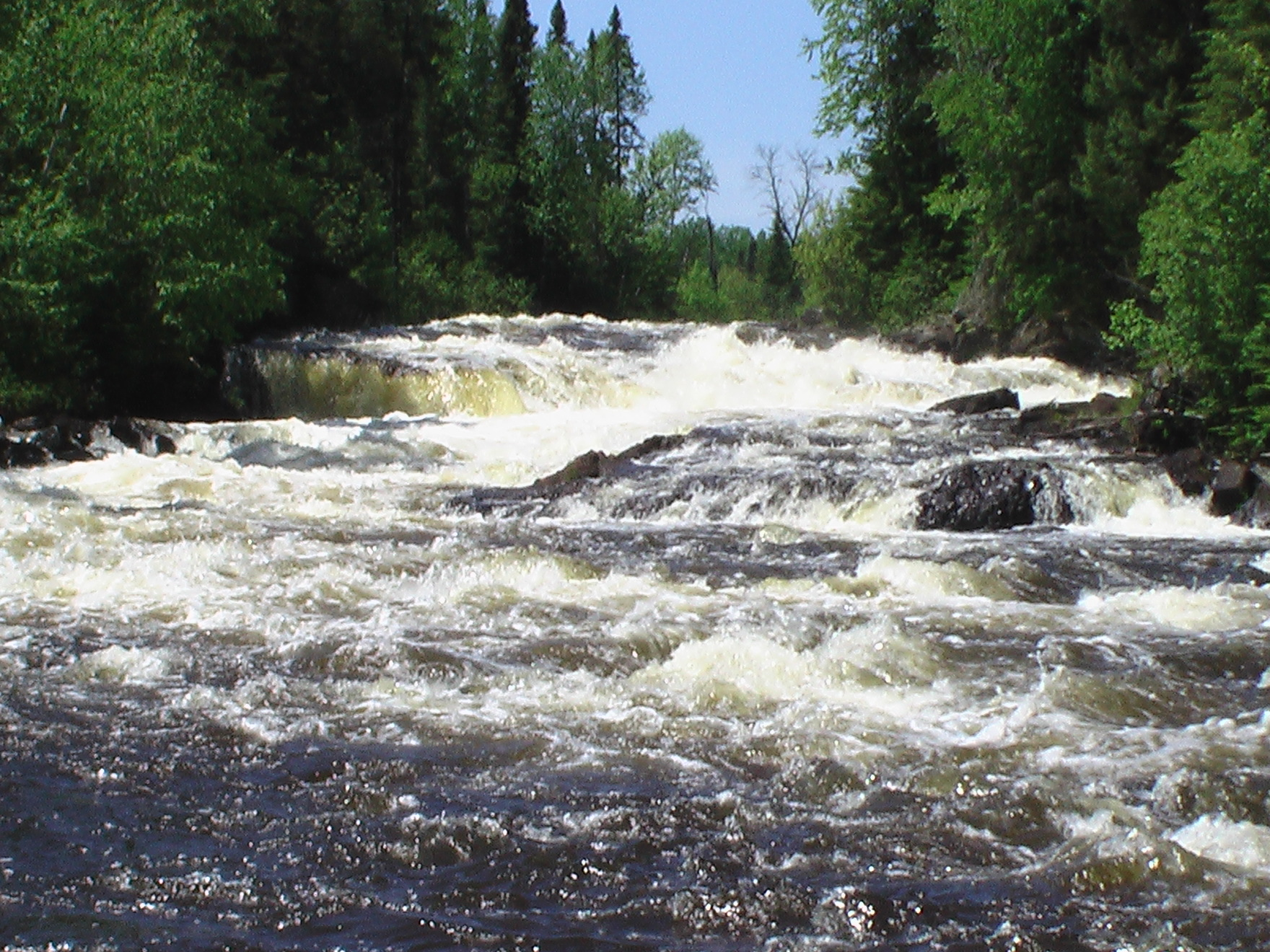

- Location of the mouth of the Shebandowan River in Ontario

Location
- Country: Canada
- Province: Ontario
- Region: Northeastern Ontario
- District: Thunder Bay

Physical characteristics
- Source: Lower Shebandowan Lake
  - location: Conacher Township
  - coordinates: 48°37′11″N 90°03′45″W
  - elevation: 449 m (1,473 ft)
- Mouth: Matawin River
  - location: Horne Township
  - coordinates: 48°32′56″N 89°53′27″W
  - elevation: 366 m (1,201 ft)

Basin features
- River system: Great Lakes Basin
- Tributaries
  - left: Oskondaga River

The Shebandowan River is a river in Thunder Bay District in Northwestern Ontario, Canada. It is in the Great Lakes Basin and is a left tributary of the Matawin River. Three-quarters of the length of the river valley is paralleled by Ontario Highway 11, at this point part of the Trans-Canada Highway; and the entire length of the river valley is paralleled by a Canadian National Railway main line, built originally as the Canadian Northern Railway transcontinental main line.

== Course ==
The river begins at Lower Shebandowan Lake, part of a trio of lakes (Upper, Middle and Lower Shebandown lakes) known collectively as Shebandowan Lakes, in geographic Conacher Township. It exits the lake east over a dam at the community of Shebandowan, passes into geographic Blackwell Township, continues east into geographic Dawson Road Lots Township, and takes in the left tributary Oskondaga River south of the community of Shabaqua Corners. The river leaves Ontario Highway 11 and turns southeast into geographic Laurie Township, passes the community of Shabaqua, enters geographic Horne Township, and reaches its mouth at the Matawin River. The Matawin River flows via the Kaministiquia River to Lake Superior.

== Tributaries ==
- Oskondaga River (left)

== See also ==
- List of rivers of Ontario

== Sources ==
- Map 13 (PDF) (Map). 1 : 1,600,000. Official road map of Ontario. Ministry of Transportation of Ontario. 2014.
- Restructured municipalities - Ontario map #2 (Map). Restructuring Maps of Ontario. Ontario Ministry of Municipal Affairs and Housing. 2006.
