= Dog River (Ontario) =

River in Ontario, Canada

Coordinates: 48.57573°N 89.60239°W

Dog River is a river located northwest of Thunder Bay, Ontario, Canada. It enters the northern end of Big Dog Lake and drains at the southern end, continuing to Little Dog Lake and then to its confluence with the Matawin River to form Kaministiquia River. The name "Kaministiquia" comes from an Ojibwe word meaning "where the rivers meet". It derives its name from a large effigy of a dog dug into the ridge separating Big and Little Dog Lakes. Ojibwe Indians created the effigy to honour a dog which had alerted their sleeping village of an impending attack by the Cree. The 'dog' was found and excavated by Professor Kenneth Dawson and is located on the crest of a hill with a view above the hydro standpipe.

== See also ==
- List of rivers of Ontario
