= Kakabeka Generating Station =

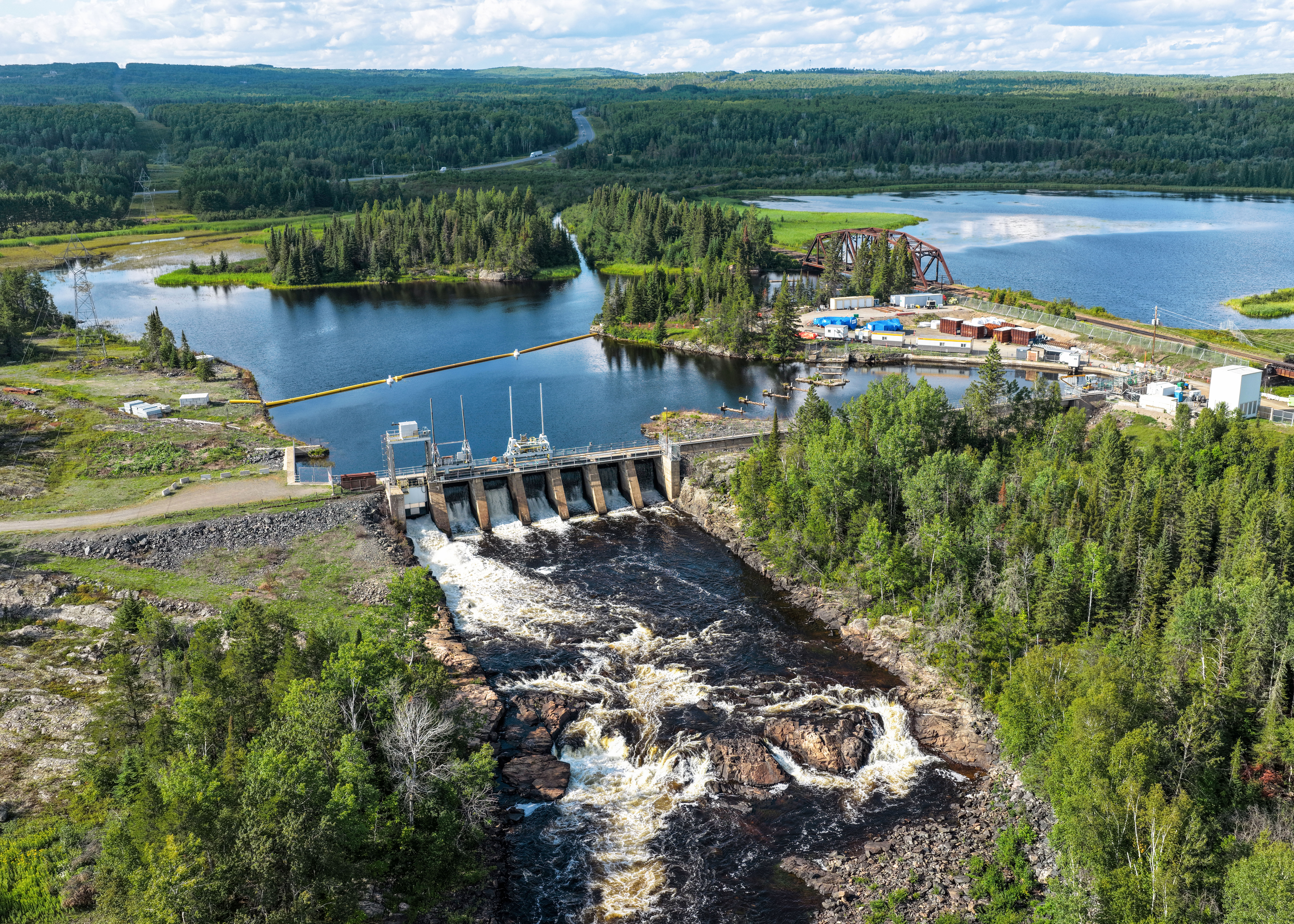
- Kakabeka Intake, located upstream from the generating station

- Location in Ontario
- Country: Canada
- Location: Kakabeka Falls Provincial Park
- Coordinates: 48°24′54″N 89°37′46″W
- Purpose: Power
- Status: Operational
- Construction began: September 1905
- Opening date: 1906
- Owner: Ontario Power Generation

Dam and spillways
- Impounds: Kaministiquia River

Power Station
- Coordinates: 48°23′51″N 89°36′59″W
- Type: Conventional
- Turbines: 4
- Installed capacity: 25 MW

Kakabeka Generating Station is a hydroelectric facility operated by Ontario Power Generation on the bank of the Kaministiquia River, 2 km (1.2 mi) downstream from Kakabeka Falls in the community of Kakabeka Falls, Ontario, 30 km (19 mi) west of Thunder Bay. The plant provides energy to the city of Thunder Bay and area. The station is one of ten hydroelectric stations in Ontario Power Generation's Northwest Plant Group, and is remotely operated from Thunder Bay.

Kakabeka Generating Station began operating in 1906, with two hydroelectric generating units. A third unit was added in 1911, and a fourth was added in 1914. Its four units provide a peak output of 25 MW, enough energy to supply 14,000 homes.

The station is among the oldest power stations in Ontario, and much of the original equipment from 1906 is still in operation. It was owned and operated by the Kaministiquia Power Company until 1949, when it was purchased from its parent company, Abitibi Power and Paper Company, by the Hydro-Electric Power Commission of Ontario, which became Ontario Hydro in 1974. After the 1999 restructuring of Ontario Hydro, the plant came under control of Ontario Power Generation.

== Overview ==
The facility includes a dam located 2 km (1.2 mi) upstream from the powerhouse, which is used to divert and control the water flowing to the generating station. It consists of a main sluice operated from Thunder Bay and six stop log sluices operated manually on-site. The intake structure is located on the eastern end of the dam and water flow into the aqueduct is controlled by three gated intake openings. The 2 km (1.2 mi) aqueduct has an internal diameter of 5 m (16 ft), and terminates at a large surge chamber. Four penstocks lead from the surge chamber, one for each unit, following the natural slope of the escarpment. Each is sized appropriately for requirements of the unit at which it terminates. Penstocks carry water from the surge chamber to the generating station, which generates electricity then flows back into the Kaministiquia River.

The powerhouse contains its original Francis turbines, manufactured by J. M. Voith in Heidenheim, Germany, and its generators were made by the Canadian General Electric Corporation. It has three 7,000 HP units which produce 5.3 MW of electricity each, and a 12,000 HP unit, generating 8.7 MW, for a total output of 24.6 MW.

== History ==
Plans for a hydro electric plant at Kakabeka began in 1896, when Chicago entrepreneur Edward Spencer Jenison wished to serve the electricity demands of the nearby towns of Fort William and Port Arthur. Hydroelectricity at this time was in its infancy, and delivery of the electricity to its destination would prove a challenge as alternating current was a relatively new development. Shortly after gaining rights to develop the project, Jenison sold them to three Canadian businessmen, who formed the Kaministiquia Power Company.

=== Construction ===
Construction of the facility began in September, 1905 and employed 600 men. It involved the construction of a railroad siding and temporary station on the CN line 0.8 km (0.50 mi) from the falls, and the construction of a narrow gauge railway to bring equipment to the site. Three aqueducts measuring 3 m (9.8 ft) in diameter were constructed to bring water from Ecarte Rapids upstream from Kakabeka Falls to the surge chamber. Water then flowed through four penstocks to the station below, a total decline of 58 m (190 ft).

The plant originally consisted of two 7,000 HP Francis turbine units, manufactured by J. M. Voith in Heidenheim, Germany, which produce 5.3 MW of electricity each. An expansion in 1911 saw the addition of a third 5 MW unit, at which point the powerhouse was expanded to its present size. In 1914, a fourth unit, generating 8.7 MW, and the third aqueduct, were added. In 1998, the three aqueducts were replaced with one large aqueduct with a 5 m (16 ft) internal diameter.

== See also ==
- List of generating stations in Canada
- List of generating stations in Ontario
