= Matawin River (Ontario) =

- Location of the mouth of the Matawin River in Ontario

Location
- Country: Canada
- Province: Ontario
- Region: Northern Ontario
- District: Thunder Bay

Physical characteristics
- Source: Swallow Lake
  - coordinates: 48°26′17″N 90°18′51″W
  - elevation: 493 m (1,617 ft)
- Mouth: Kaministiquia River
  - coordinates: 48°32′17″N 89°35′44″W
  - elevation: 308 m (1,010 ft)

Basin features
- River system: Great Lakes Basin
- Tributaries
  - left: Shebandowan River
  - right: Wiegand River

The Matawin River is a river in Thunder Bay District in Northwestern Ontario, Canada. It is in the Great Lakes Basin and is a right tributary of the Kaministiquia River.

== Course ==
The river begins at Swallow Lake and flows south east then east, passing through Matawin River Provincial Park The river heads northeast, passes into geographic Sackville Township, then geographic Laurie Township, passes over a concrete weir built in 1969 (replacing a "…wooden weir built by the Great Lakes Paper Company in the 1930s for use in their log drives.") that helps to regulate water flow further downstream, passes over a series of falls called McGraw Falls, enters geographic Horne Township, and takes in the left tributary Shebandowan River. From this point downstream to the mouth, the river is paralleled by the Canadian National Railway (CN) main line (originally the Canadian Northern Railway transcontinental main line). The river continues east, takes in the right tributary Wiegand River, passes through the northwest corner of the municipality of Conmee, enters geographic Dawson Road Lots Township, and reaches the community of Sunshine. There, the river is crossed by the concurrent Ontario Highway 11 and Ontario Highway 17, at this point part of the Trans-Canada Highway, and the Canadian Pacific Railway transcontinental main line, and just further downstream at the railway point of Conmee by the CN Graham Subdivision main line (originally built as part of the National Transcontinental Railway), now abandoned. In addition, Ontario Highway 102 (originally the Old Dawson Trail) follows the river valley from Sistonens Corners, on the right bank across from Sunshine, to the river mouth. Leaving Conmee, the river continues east, and reaches its mouth at the Kaministiquia River just upstream of the Ontario Highway 102 bridge over the latter river at the community of Kaministiquia. The Kaministiquia River flows to Lake Superior.

== Hydroelectricity ==
A 2 MW intermittent peaking hydroelectric plant at McGraw Falls has been proposed and investigated by McGraw Falls Power, but as of September 2014 has not been implemented.

== Tributaries ==
- Wiegand River (right)
- Shebandowan River (left)
- Serpent Creek (right)
- Sackville Creek (right)
- Gold Creek (left)
- Kekek Creek (left)
- Young Creek (left)
- Shackers Creek (left)
- Carson Creek (right)
- Batwing Creek (left)
- Topaz Creek (right)

== See also ==
- List of rivers of Ontario

== Sources ==
- Map 13 (PDF) (Map). 1 : 1,600,000. Official road map of Ontario. Ministry of Transportation of Ontario. 2014.
- Restructured municipalities - Ontario map #2 (Map). Restructuring Maps of Ontario. Ontario Ministry of Municipal Affairs and Housing. 2006. Archived from the original on 2014-04-10.
