= Kaministiquia River =

River flowing to Lake Superior in Ontario

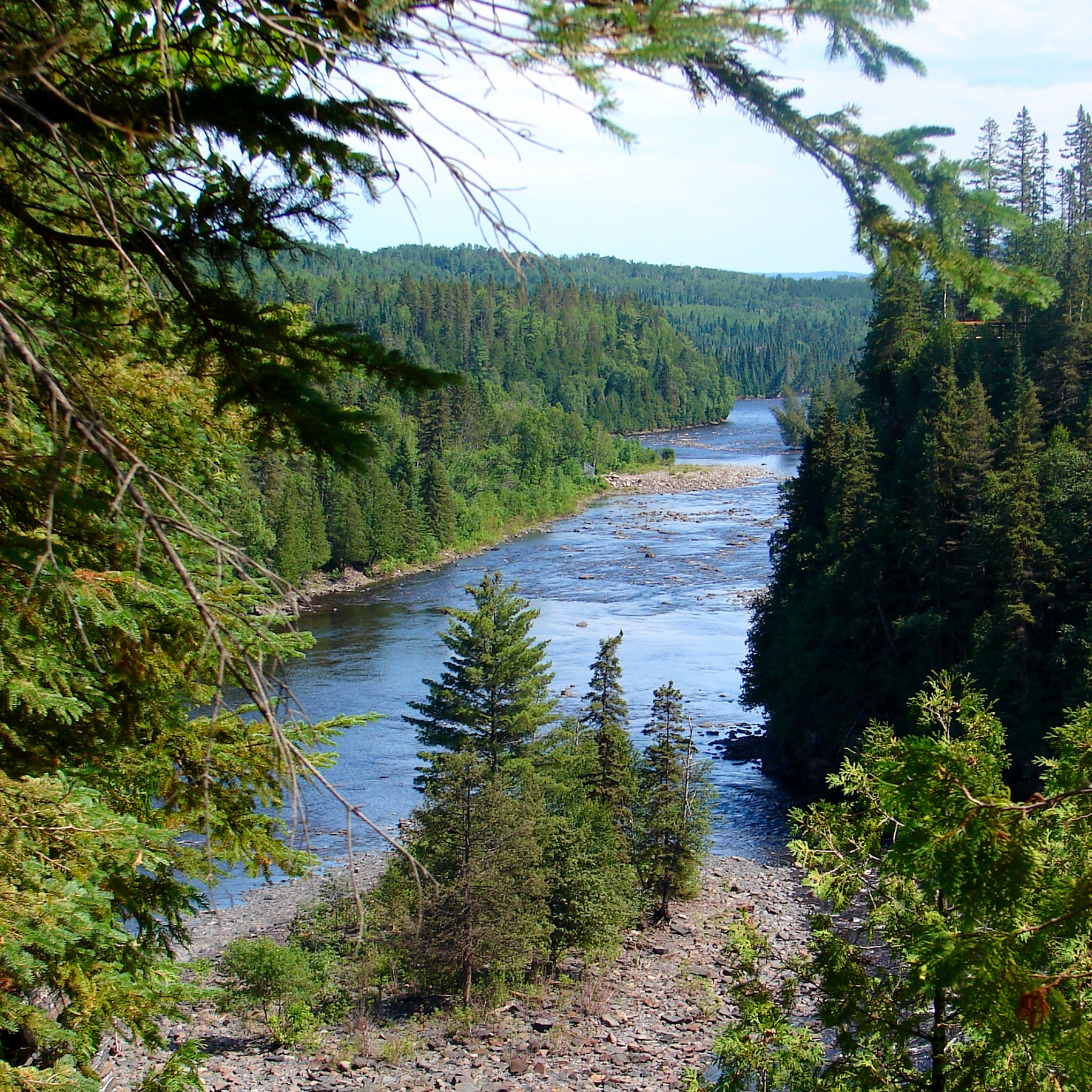

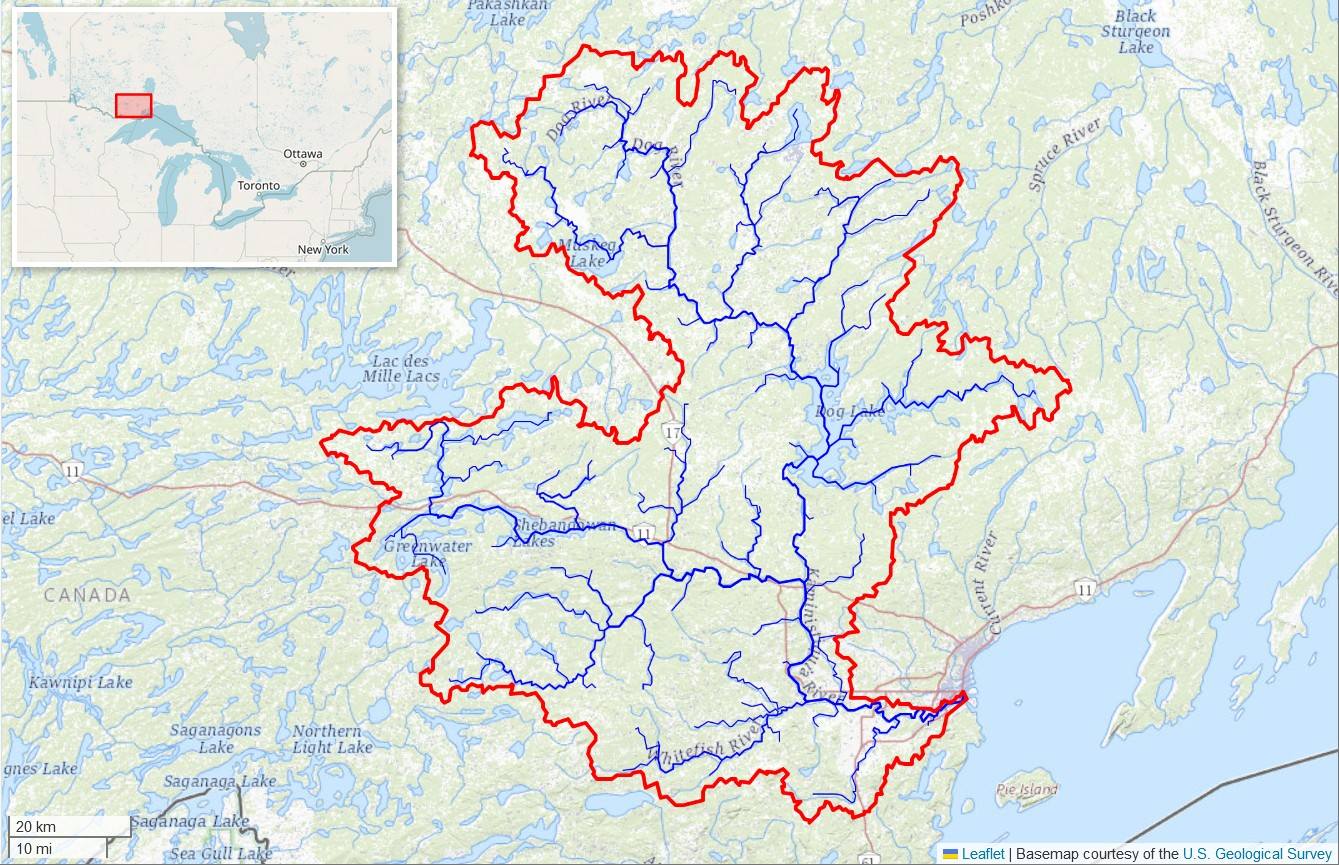
- Kaministiquia River watershed

- Location of the mouth of the Kaministiquia River

Location
- Country: Canada
- Province: Ontario
- Region: Northern Ontario
- District: Thunder Bay

Physical characteristics
- Source: Dog Lake
  - location: Ontario
  - coordinates: 48°41′53″N 89°38′29″W
  - elevation: 420 m (1,380 ft)
- Mouth: Lake Superior
  - location: At the city of Thunder Bay, Ontario
  - coordinates: 48°23′34″N 89°12′58″W
  - elevation: 183.5 m (602 ft)
- Length: 95 km (59 mi)

Basin features
- River system: Great Lakes Basin

The Kaministiquia River (/ˌkæmɪˈnɪstɪkwɑː/) is a river which flows into western Lake Superior at the city of Thunder Bay, Ontario. Kaministiquia (Gaa-ministigweyaa) is an Ojibwe word meaning "where a stream flows in island" due to two large islands (McKellar and Mission) at the mouth of the river. The delta has three branches or outlets, reflected on early North American maps in French as "les trois rivières" (the three rivers): the southernmost is known as the Mission River, the central branch as the McKellar River, and the northernmost branch as the Kaministiquia. Residents of the region commonly refer to the river as the Kam River.

Water flow in the Kaministiquia River system is regulated at the Dog Lake dams 1 and 2 and at the Greenwater, Kashabowie and Shebandowan dams. Two generating stations, one at Kakabeka Falls (25 MW) and another at Silver Falls (48 MW), are operated by Ontario Power Generation (OPG), a public company wholly owned by Government of Ontario.

== Geography ==
Kakabeka Falls, located on this river, is the largest waterfall in the Lake Superior watershed at a height of 47 metres (154 ft). Below these falls, the river flows through an extensive floodplain created by an ancient predecessor that flowed through this region following the last ice age.

=== Tributaries ===
- Whitefish River
- Matawin River
- Depot Creek
- Dog River

== History ==
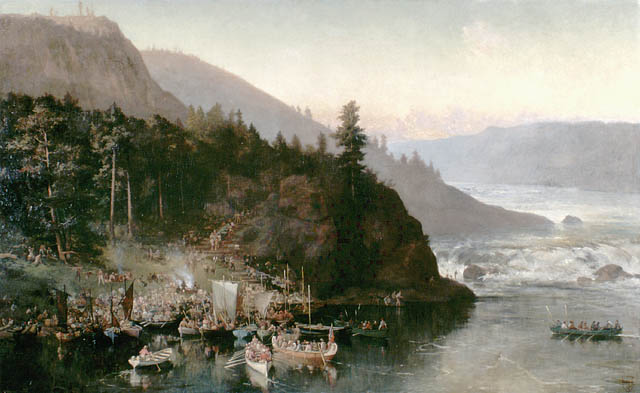
The Red River Expedition at Kakabeka Falls by Frances Anne Hopkins, 1877

"Kamanistigouian", as a place, is first mentioned in a decree of the Conseil Souverain de la Nouvelle-France dated August 23, 1681 instructing one of two canoes to make known the king's amnesty to coureurs de bois. The unnamed river is depicted on the 1671 "Carte des Jésuites" as "R. [rivière] par où l'on va aux Assinipoualacs à 120 lieues vers le Nord-Ouest" (river by which one travels to the Assiniboine 120 leagues to the north-west). Like the Pigeon River, this river was an important part of the water route into western Canada. During the French regime, two fur trading posts were established at the delta of the Kaministiquia, the first by Daniel Greysolon, Sieur du Lhut (1684/85-1696) and a second one in 1717 by Zacharie Robutel de la Noue. Both are now usually referred to as "Fort Kaministiquia" because of the large number of variant spellings used during the French regime, such as Kamanistigouian, Camanistigoyan, Kaministigoyan, etc. Decades later, a British trading post of Fort William was established here in 1803 by the North West Company at the river's mouth, and another upstream at Point de Meuron by the Hudson's Bay Company. The two rival British posts were amalgamated in 1821. The river has had many spellings since 1681, finally being spelled as Kaministiquia, although for a time Kaministikwia was also an official spelling.

Following the opening of the United States canal and locks at Sault Ste Marie, Michigan, in 1855, the river became more accessible to navigation. Silt had created a sand bar at its principal mouth, such that dredging was required as early as 1873 to enable larger boats to venture farther upstream.

After 1883, the lower Kaministiquia river was heavily industrialized by the Canadian Pacific Railway (CPR), which constructed railway yards, coal yards and docks, grain elevators, shipping docks, and sawmills. The double-deck Jackknife Bascule Bridge was built by the CPR in 1913 to allow trains and vehicles to cross from the mainland to Mission Island. The Thunder Bay Generating Station is located on Mission Island in the river's delta. The three branches of the river at the delta were extensively dredged and widened by the federal Department of Public Works in the early twentieth century to facilitate navigation.

The river has been depicted by many prominent Canadian artists such as William Armstrong (1822–1914), Frances Anne Hopkins (The Red River Expedition at Kakabeka Falls, 1877) and Lucius Richard O'Brien (Kakabeka Falls, 1882).

== Voyageur route ==
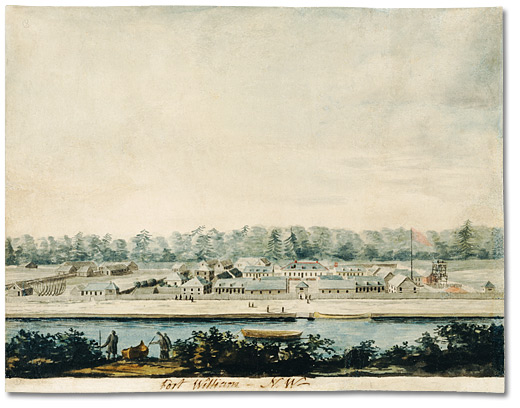
Fort William on the Kaministiquia River in 1811

Since the Grand Portage route was better, the Kaministiquia route was soon forgotten. The problem was that it was on the US side. In 1784 the North West Company sent Edward Umfreville to find a route on the British side. He failed. In the summer of 1798 Roderick McKenzie, the cousin of Alexander Mackenzie, met a group of Indians on the Height of Land Portage, who showed him the Kaministiquia route. The new route was approved by Simon McTavish in 1799.

This section covers the voyageur route from Fort William 217 kilometres (135 mi) west to the juncture of the Grand Portage route at Lac La Croix. For the other route see Grand Portage. For the whole route to Lake Winnipeg see Winnipeg River and for all routes see Canadian canoe routes. The Kaministiquia and Grand Portage were the two main routes used by Canadian fur traders to travel to western Canada from the Great Lakes. The Kaministiquia route was first used in 1688 by Jacques de Noyon. About 1731 La Vérendrye used Grand Portage, which became the preferred route. Since it was impractical for western traders to make a round trip to Montreal in one season, they would go to Grand Portage and exchange goods with boats that had come up from Montreal. By 1803 it was found that Grand Portage was on the US side of the border and the route was moved 64 kilometres (40 mi) northeast to Fort William.

The canoe route ran west from Fort William with only one decharge to Kakabeka Falls, which was passed by the Mountain Portage. The North West Company soon built a road to a depot above the falls. From here north up a swift stretch with at least seven portages, and then some more portages and significant altitude gain to Dog Lake about 40 kilometres (25 mi) northwest of Fort William. Then an easy 80 kilometres (50 mi) northwest up the twisting Dog River, Jordain Creek and Cold Water Creek to Cold Water Lake. Then began a difficult boggy stretch west through the 4.8-kilometre (3 mi) Prairie Portage, Height of Land Lake, the 800-metre (1/2 mi) De Milieu Portage, Lac de Milieu, the 2.4-kilometre (1 1/2 mi) Savanne Portage to the Savanne River in the Lake Winnipeg drainage. Then west down the Savanne to Lac des Mille Lacs. Since the Seine River is too rough for freight canoes, the route went over the 400-metre (1/4 mi) Baril Portage to the Pickerel River and Pickerel Lake, the Pickerel and Deux Rivières Portages to Sturgeon Lake and down the Maligne River to Lac La Croix, where the route from Grand Portage came in from the southeast. For the route west from Lac La Croix see Canadian canoe routes.

== See also ==
- List of rivers of Ontario
