= Timeline of the Great Recession =

This article gives the timeline of the Great Recession, which hit many developed economies in the due to the 2008 financial crisis.

Note: The date indicated is that of the official announcement by the department or the public agency in charge of the measurement of the economic activity of the country. Thus, because of possible lags in the collection of statistics, it is possible that the chronological order of reports may not correspond to the actual order of events in recession.

== Definition of recession ==
A recession is a period of two quarters of negative GDP growth. The countries listed are those that officially announced that they were in recession.

It is worth noting that some developed countries such as South Korea and Australia did not enter recession (indeed Australia contracted for the last quarter of 2008 only to grow 1% for the first half of 2009). Poland, then considered to be an emerging market country, also avoided the recession as a result of their strong domestic market, low private debt and flexible currency.

== Timeline overview ==
The table below displays all national recessions appearing in 2006–2013 (for the 71 countries with available data), according to the common recession definition, saying that a recession occurred whenever seasonally adjusted real GDP contracts quarter on quarter, through minimum two consecutive quarters. Only 11 out of the 71 listed countries with quarterly GDP data (Poland, Slovakia, Moldova, India, China, South Korea, Indonesia, Australia, Uruguay, Colombia and Bolivia) escaped a recession in this time period.

The few recessions appearing early in 2006–07 are commonly never associated to be part of the Great Recession, which is illustrated by the fact that only two countries (Iceland and Jamaica) were in recession in Q4 2007.

One year before the maximum, in Q1 2008, only six countries were in recession (Iceland, Sweden, Finland, Ireland, Portugal and New Zealand). The number of countries in recession was 25 in Q2 2008, 39 in Q3 2008 and 53 in Q4 2008. At the steepest part of the Great Recession in Q1 2009, a total of 59 out of 71 countries were simultaneously in recession. The number of countries in recession was 37 in Q2 2009, 13 in Q3 2009 and 11 in Q4 2009. One year after the maximum, in Q1 2010, only seven countries were in recession (Greece, Croatia, Romania, Iceland, Jamaica, Venezuela and Belize).

The recession data for the overall G20 zone (representing 85% of all GWP), depict that the Great Recession existed as a global recession throughout Q3 2008 until Q1 2009.

Subsequent follow-up recessions in 2010–2013 were confined to Belize, El Salvador, Paraguay, Jamaica, Japan, Taiwan, New Zealand and 24 out of 50 European countries (including Greece). As of October 2014, only five out of the 71 countries with available quarterly data (Cyprus, Italy, Croatia, Belize and El Salvador), were still in ongoing recessions. The many follow-up recessions hitting the European countries, are commonly referred to as being direct repercussions of the European debt crisis.

Country (Note: 105 out of the 206 sovereign countries in the World, did not publish any quarterly GDP data for the 2006–2013 period. The following 21 countries were also excluded from the table, due to only publishing unadjusted quarterly real GDP figures with no seasonal adjustment: Armenia, Azerbaijan, Belarus, Brunei, Dominican Republic, Egypt, Georgia, Guatemala, Iran, Jordan, Macao, Montenegro, Morocco, Nicaragua, Nigeria, Palestine, Qatar, Rwanda, Sri Lanka, Trinidad and Tobago, Vietnam.)	Recession period(s) during 2006–2017 (measured by quarter-on-quarter changes of seasonally adjusted real GDP, as per the latest revised Q3 2013 data from 10 January 2014) (Note: Only seasonally adjusted qoq-data can be used to accurately determine recession periods. When quarterly change is calculated by comparing quarters with the same quarter of last year, this results only in an aggregated -often delayed- indication, because of being a product of all quarterly changes taking place since the same quarter last year. Currently there is no seasonal adjusted qoq-data available for Greece and the Republic of Macedonia, which is why the table display the recession intervals for these two countries only based upon the alternative indicative data format.)
Albania	Q1 2007 until Q2 2007 (6 months); Q3 2009 until Q4 2009 (6 months); Q4 2011 until Q1 2012 (6 months)
Argentina	Q4 2008 until Q2 2009 (9 months); Q1 2012 until Q2 2012 (6 months); Q3 2013 until Q3 2014 (12 months); Q3 2015 until Q3 2016 (15 months)
Australia	None
Austria	Q2 2008 until Q2 2009 (15 months); Q3 2011 until Q4 2011 (6 months)
Belgium	Q3 2008 until Q1 2009 (9 months); Q2 2012 until Q1 2013 (12 months)
Belize	Q1 2006 until Q2 2006 (6 months); Q1 2007 until Q3 2007 (9 months); Q4 2008 until Q1 2009 (6 months); Q4 2009 until Q1 2010 (6 months); Q1 2011 until Q2 2011 (6 months); Q2 2013 until Q1 2017 (48 months)
Bolivia	None (Note: Bolivia had as of January 2014 only published seasonally adjusted real GDP data until Q1 2010, with the statistics office still to publish data for 2010-13.)
Brazil	Q4 2008 until Q1 2009 (6 months); Q1 2014 until Q4 2016 (36 months)
Bulgaria	Q1 2009 until Q2 2009 (6 months)
Canada	Q4 2008 until Q2 2009 (9 months)
Chile	Q2 2008 until Q1 2009 (12 months)
China	None
Colombia	None
Costa Rica	Q2 2008 until Q1 2009 (12 months)
Croatia	Q3 2008 until Q2 2010 (24 months); Q3 2011 until Q4 2012 (18 months); Q2 2013 until Q2 2014 (15 months)
Cyprus	Q1 2009 until Q4 2009 (12 months); Q3 2011 until Q4 2014 (42 months)
Czech Republic	Q4 2008 until Q2 2009 (9 months); Q4 2011 until Q1 2013 (18 months)
Denmark	Q3 2008 until Q2 2009 (12 months); Q3 2011 until Q4 2011 (6 months); Q4 2012 until Q1 2013 (6 months)
Ecuador	Q4 2006 until Q1 2007 (6 months); Q1 2009 until Q3 2009 (9 months)
El Salvador	Q3 2008 until Q2 2009 (12 months) (Note: According to the methodology note for the quarterly GDP of El Salvador, this data series include seasonally adjustments.)
Estonia	Q3 2008 until Q3 2009 (15 months); Q1 2013 until Q2 2013 (6 months)
EU (28 member states)	Q2 2008 until Q2 2009 (15 months); Q4 2011 until Q2 2012 (9 months); Q4 2012 until Q1 2013 (6 months)
Eurozone (17 member states)	Q2 2008 until Q2 2009 (15 months); Q4 2011 until Q1 2013 (18 months)
Finland	Q1 2008 until Q2 2009 (18 months); Q2 2012 until Q1 2015 (36 months)
France	Q2 2008 until Q2 2009 (15 months); Q4 2012 until Q1 2013 (6 months)
G20 (43 member states, PPP-weighted GDP) (Note: The G20-zone represents 85% of all GWP, and comprise 19 member states (incl. UK, France, Germany and Italy) along with the EU Commission as the 20th member, who represents the remaining 24 EU member states in the forum.)	Q3 2008 until Q1 2009 (9 months)
Germany	Q2 2008 until Q1 2009 (12 months)
Greece	Q3 2008 until Q2 2014 (63 months); Q1 2015 until Q1 2017 (27 months)
Hong Kong	Q2 2008 until Q1 2009 (12 months)
Hungary	Q1 2007 until Q2 2007 (6 months); Q2 2008 until Q3 2009 (18 months); Q2 2011 until Q3 2011 (6 months); Q1 2012 until Q4 2012 (12 months)
Iceland	Q4 2007 until Q2 2008 (9 months); Q4 2008 until Q1 2009 (6 months); Q3 2009 until Q2 2010 (12 months)
India	None
Indonesia	None
Ireland	Q2 2007 until Q3 2007 (6 months); Q1 2008 until Q4 2009 (24 months); Q3 2011 until Q2 2013 (24 months)
Israel	Q4 2008 until Q1 2009 (6 months)
Italy	Q3 2007 until Q4 2007 (6 months); Q2 2008 until Q2 2009 (15 months); Q3 2011 until Q3 2013 (27 months); Q1 2014 until Q4 2014 (12 months)
Jamaica	Q3 2007 until Q4 2007 (6 months); Q3 2008 until Q1 2009 (9 months); Q4 2009 until Q2 2010 (9 months); Q4 2011 until Q1 2012 (6 months); Q4 2012 until Q1 2013 (6 months)
Japan	Q2 2008 until Q1 2009 (12 months); Q4 2010 until Q2 2011 (9 months); Q2 2012 until Q3 2012 (6 months)
Kazakhstan	Q3 2008 until Q1 2009 (9 months) (Note: Kazakhstan had as of January 2014 only published seasonally adjusted real GDP data until Q4 2009, with the statistics office still to publish data for 2010-13.)
Latvia	Q1 2008 until Q3 2009 (18 months); Q1 2010 until Q2 2010 (12 months)
Lithuania	Q3 2008 until Q2 2009 (12 months)
Luxembourg	Q2 2008 until Q1 2009 (12 months)
Republic of Macedonia	Q1 2009 until Q3 2009 (9 months); Q1 2012 until Q2 2012 (6 months) (not qoq-data, but quarters compared with same quarter of last year); Q1 2012 until Q2 2012 (6 months)
Malaysia	Q3 2008 until Q1 2009 (9 months)
Malta	Q4 2008 until Q1 2009 (6 months)
Mexico	Q3 2008 until Q2 2009 (12 months)
Moldova	None (Note: Moldova had as of January 2014 only published seasonally adjusted real GDP data until Q4 2010, with the statistics office still to publish data for 2011-13.)
Netherlands	Q2 2008 until Q2 2009 (15 months); Q2 2011 until Q1 2012 (12 months); Q3 2012 until Q2 2013 (12 months)
New Zealand	Q1 2008 until Q2 2009 (18 months); Q3 2010 until Q4 2010 (6 months)
Norway	Q1 2009 until Q2 2009 (6 months); Q2 2010 until Q3 2010 (6 months); Q1 2011 until Q2 2011 (6 months)
OECD (34 member states, PPP-weighted GDP)	Q2 2008 until Q1 2009 (12 months)
Paraguay	Q3 2008 until Q1 2009 (9 months); Q2 2011 until Q3 2011 (6 months)
Peru	Q4 2008 until Q2 2009 (9 months)
Philippines	Q4 2008 until Q1 2009 (6 months)
Poland	None
Portugal	Q2 2007 until Q3 2007 (6 months); Q1 2008 until Q1 2009 (15 months); Q4 2010 until Q1 2013 (30 months)
Romania	Q4 2008 until Q2 2009 (9 months); Q4 2009 until Q1 2010 (6 months); Q4 2011 until Q1 2012 (6 months)
Russia	Q3 2008 until Q2 2009 (12 months); Q4 2014 until Q4 2016 (27 months)
Serbia	Q2 2008 until Q2 2009 (15 months); Q2 2011 until Q1 2012 (12 months); Q3 2012 until Q4 2012 (6 months)
Singapore	Q2 2008 until Q1 2009 (12 months)
Slovakia	None
Slovenia	Q3 2008 until Q2 2009 (12 months); Q3 2011 until Q4 2013 (24 months)
South Africa	Q4 2008 until Q2 2009 (9 months)
South Korea	None
Spain	Q2 2008 until Q4 2009 (21 months); Q2 2011 until Q2 2013 (27 months)
Sweden	Q1 2008 until Q1 2009 (15 months)
Switzerland	Q4 2008 until Q2 2009 (9 months)
Taiwan	Q2 2008 until Q1 2009 (12 months); Q3 2011 until Q4 2011 (6 months)
Thailand	Q4 2008 until Q1 2009 (6 months)
Turkey	Q2 2008 until Q1 2009 (12 months)
Ukraine	Q2 2008 until Q1 2009 (12 months); Q3 2012 until Q4 2012 (6 months)
United Kingdom	Q2 2008 until Q2 2009 (15 months)
United States	Q3 2008 until Q2 2009 (12 months)
Uruguay	None
Venezuela	Q1 2009 until Q1 2010 (15 months)

== 2008 ==
=== July ===
- July 1, 2008: Denmark

Denmark becomes the first European economy to confirm it is in recession since the global credit crunch began. Its GDP shrinks 0.6% in the first quarter after a 0.2% contraction in the fourth quarter of 2007.

=== August ===
- August 13, 2008: Estonia

The Baltic state slides into recession with a 0.9% fall in second-quarter GDP after a drop of 0.5% in the first quarter. It falls deeper into recession in the third quarter when the economy contracted 3.3%.

=== September ===
- September 8, 2008: Latvia

Latvia joins its northern neighbor Estonia in recession as GDP falls 0.2% in the second quarter from the first quarter, when it fell 0.3%. Property markets and construction have suffered in both Baltic states.

- September 25, 2008: (Republic of Ireland) Ireland

The "Celtic Tiger" slides into recession for the first time in over two decades, recording a 0.5% fall in second quarter GDP, following a 0.3% decline in the first quarter. Its last recession in 1983 saw thousands of people leave Ireland to seek work overseas.

=== October ===
- October 10, 2008: Singapore

First Asian country to slip into a recession since the credit crisis began. Singapore's export-dependent economy shrank an annualized 6.3% in the third quarter after a revised 5.7% contraction in the second quarter; its first recession since 2002. Growth has faltered in Singapore as a result of less demand for exports, a reduction in tourism, and the end of the real-estate boom. Singapore's manufacturing sector had declined 4.9% in the previous quarter.

- October 24, 2008: Iceland

Iceland receives a £1.3 billion (US$2.06 billion, €1.63 billion) bailout package from the International Monetary Fund as the first European country to require an emergency loan with the aim of stabilising the collapsed currency and strengthening the tax system as well as the nationalised banks.

- October 27, 2008: Australia

BNP Paribas stated that Australia is in a risky position with regards to the 2008 financial crisis as foreign liabilities accounted for 60% of the nation's GDP.

- October 28, 2008 United Kingdom

500,000 mortgage holders are left in negative equity after house prices dropped 15% since the previous summer, with another 700,000 mortgage holders facing the same risk if prices continue to fall.

=== November ===
- November 13, 2008: Germany

Europe's largest economy contracted by 0.5% in the third quarter after GDP fell 0.4% in the second quarter, putting it in recession for the first time in five years.

- November 13, 2008: Indonesia, Malaysia, Thailand, The Philippines

Equity research by Deutsche Bank states that Indonesia, Malaysia, Thailand and the Philippines should not experience a recession, despite potential harm to economic growth from falling commodity prices and possible weaker exports.

- November 14, 2008: Italy

Italy plunges into recession, its first since the start of 2005, after GDP contracts a steeper-than-expected 0.5% in the third quarter. Second quarter GDP dropped 0.3%.

- November 14, 2008: Hong Kong

Hong Kong becomes the second Asian economy to tip into recession, its exports hit by weakening global demand. Third-quarter GDP drops a seasonally adjusted 0.5% after a 1.4% fall in the previous quarter.

- November 14, 2008: (European Union) Eurozone

Taken as a whole the Eurozone officially slips under, pushed down by recessions in Germany and Italy for its first recession since its creation in 1999. These 15 countries are: Austria, Belgium, Cyprus, Finland, France, Germany, Greece, Ireland, Italy, Luxembourg, Malta, Netherlands, Portugal, Slovenia, Spain. On January 1, 2009, Slovakia adopted the euro, and so is now part of the Eurozone. Though the Eurozone suffers from recession as a whole, Belgium, France, Greece, and Slovakia still have better growth.

- November 17, 2008: Japan

The world's second-biggest economy slides into recession, its first in seven years. Its GDP contracts 0.1% in the July–September quarter, as the 2008 financial crisis curbs demand for its exports. It shrank 0.9% in the previous quarter.

- November 23, 2008: Hawaii

Economists at the University of Hawaii reported that the state entered the recession in the previous quarter based on the drop in tourist figures and growing unemployment, with 8,800 jobs expected to be cut in 2009.

- November 28, 2008: Canada

In 2008, Canada had positive GDP growth in Q2 and Q3 but GDP fell by a sharp 3.4% annualized in Q4. Growth is widely expected to remain in recession territory going into 2009. Canada is the only OECD country out of the recession at this time.

- November 28, 2008: Sweden

Sweden technically enters the recession after experiencing contraction of 0.1% in the second and third quarter.

=== December ===
- December 1, 2008: United States

The US economy has been in recession since December 2007, the National Bureau of Economic Research announced in December 2008. The bureau is a private research institute widely regarded as the official arbiter of US economic cycles. It said a 73-month economic expansion had come to an end. The Bureau stated that the deteriorating labour market throughout 2008 provided reason to state the commencement of the recession as December 2007.

- December 12, 2008: Russia

Andrei Klepach, a deputy economics minister of Russia, states that Russia has entered the recession, with two quarters of contraction expected, meaning Russia will fall short of reaching the 6.8% growth forecast for 2008.

== 2009 ==
=== January ===
- January 13, 2009: South Korea, Taiwan, Japan, United States

Global shipping experiences a drop in trade, as exports from South Korea dropping an annualised 30%, with Taiwan and Japan experiencing a 42% and 27% drop respectively. Outgoing traffic in the United States dropped 18% from Long Beach and Los Angeles.

- January 23, 2009: United Kingdom

The UK officially enters the recession as GDP fell by 1.5% in the last quarter of 2008 following a 0.6% drop in the third quarter, with unemployment growing by 131,000 to 1.92 million (6.1%) in the three months leading to November 2008. The British economy only grew 0.7% in 2008, the weakest growth since 1992.

=== February ===
- February 13, 2009: Netherlands

The Dutch Statistics agency confirms the Netherlands are in recession since April 2008; with updated figures showing minor economic reductions in the 2nd and 3rd quarters of 2008, and a 0.9% reduction in the 4th quarter

- February 18, 2009: Taiwan

The Directorate General of Budget, Accounting and Statistics announced that its economy had contracted an unprecedented 8.36% in the fourth quarter of 2008; and also recorded 2 consecutive quarters of economic contraction, thus placing the country in a technical recession.

- February 27, 2009: Finland

Statistics Finland informs that Finland's gross domestic product diminished by 1.3% in the last quarter of 2008 from the previous quarter. The growth slowed down already in early 2008 and in the third quarter output diminished by 0.3% from the previous quarter.

=== March ===
- March 4, 2009: Canada

U.S. Steel announced the closure of the Stelco Lake Erie Works in Nanticoke, Ontario due to the increasingly worse effects of the global economic slowdown. While it may have decreased the local pollution levels, it also has affected 12,000 jobs both at the Lake Erie Works and in the Haldimand-Norfolk area.

- March 4, 2009: Malaysia

Malaysia has a 50% chance of slipping into the recession as growth is expected to reach just 0.5% for the year, said the executive director Datuk Mohamed Ariff Abdul Kareem of the Malaysian Institute of Economic Research.

=== May ===
- May 15, 2009: France, Austria, Belgium, Romania, Lithuania, Luxembourg, Portugal, Hungary

The French Institute of Statistics and Economic Studies announced that French gross domestic product shrank 1.2% in the first quarter of 2009 after falling by 1.5% in the final quarter of 2008. The French economy had avoided narrowly a recession in 2008. The GDP is expected to keep shrinking in 2009. Eurostat also reported at this time that Austria, Belgium, and Romania had all entered recession in the first quarter of 2009, with two consecutive quarters of shrinking GDP, while Lithuania, Luxembourg, and Portugal had already done so in the last quarter of 2008 and Hungary in the quarter before that.

- May 19, 2009: Norway

Norway's mainland GDP, which excludes the oil and gas sectors and the shipping industry, shrank 1.0% in the three months to March after a 0.8% decline in the final quarter of 2008, with recession counted as two consecutive quarterly figures showing a contraction. Mainland GDP is considered a better indicator of the Scandinavian country's economic health, since the oil and gas sector represents 25% of its economic growth but employs only about one% of its working-age population. Still, Norway's total GDP, which includes the oil, gas and shipping sectors, shrank 0.4% in the first quarter of 2009 after 0.8% growth in the fourth quarter of 2008.

- May 20, 2009: Mexico

Mexico becomes the first Latin American country to officially enter recession, having its GDP shrink 8.22% in the first quarter of 2009, after falling 1.6% in the final quarter of 2008. To this date, it is estimated that the Mexican domestic product will shrink 5.5% in 2009. Ministry of Finances Agustin Carstens declared the country in recession on May 7, 2009, based on estimates, which were confirmed when the actual, real data was released on May 20 by INEGI.

- May 25, 2009: Thailand

Thailand's economy shrank more than expected in the first quarter, contracting the most in a decade, plunging the nation into recession. GDP shrank 7.1% in the last quarter of 2008, followed by another shrinking of 4.2% in the first quarter of 2009. According to the Singapore branch of Macquarie Group, the Thai economy is expected to recover in the fourth quarter of 2009.

- May 27, 2009: South Africa

South Africa entered recession as the global crisis pounded demand for its main exports; GDP shrank 6.4% in the first quarter of 2009 after falling 1.8% in the last quarter of 2008. This is the first recession for South Africa in 17 years. According to forecasts, the South African domestic product is likely to shrink between 1% and 1.5% in 2009.

=== June ===
- June 2, 2009: Switzerland

Switzerland officially entered a recession in the first quarter of 2009 when its economy shrank by 0.8%, after contracting 0.3% in the last quarter of 2008. The contraction was caused mainly by weakness in exports, which fell 5.4% in the quarter. Meanwhile, the Swiss watch industry had been reporting double-digit declines in watch exports for the past four months.

- June 5, 2009: Chile

First South American country to enter the recession.

- June 9, 2009: Brazil

Brazil slipped into a recession in the first quarter of 2009.

- June 11, 2009: Bulgaria

Bulgarian authorities declare the country is officially in recession after dropping 1.6% in the last quarter of 2008, followed by a 5% drop in the first quarter of 2009. Unemployment is rising rapidly and by September 500,000 people are expected to lose their jobs. Exports are down 50%. For the first three months of 2009 GDP has shrunk by 2%. Households and small businesses are heavily in debt.

- June 25, 2009: Colombia

Colombia enters into recession after witnessing 0.7% contraction in the last quarter of 2008 and 0.6% in the following quarter.

- June 30, 2009: Turkey

Turkey recorded its fastest contraction of 13.8% in the first quarter of 2009 compared to 2008, leading the country into recession after a contraction of 6.2% in the last quarter of 2008. This is Turkey's biggest economic slump since 1945.

=== July ===
- July 14, 2009: Singapore

Singapore experienced a seasonally adjusted and annualised growth of 20.4% in the second quarter as a result of increased pharmaceuticals production and construction, bringing the country out of the recession.

- July 23, 2009: Canada

On 23 July, the Bank of Canada made comments that most media interpreted as an effective statement predicting with strong certainty that the recession is over with expected growth in GDP beginning the current quarter. The Bank of Canada announced the end of the recession even though it was nascent and still dependent on government stimulus money.

=== August ===
- August 13, 2009: France, Germany

The French and German GDP both grew 0.3% in the second quarter of 2009; analysts had not anticipated such a quick recovery.

- August 14, 2009: Hong Kong

After shrinking 4.3% during January–March, Hong Kong's GDP grew 3.3% between April and June, improving its GDP forecasts, which went from negative growth between 5.5 and 6.5% to negative growth between 4.5 and 5.5%. Still, comparing the second quarter of 2009 to the second quarter of 2008, Hong Kong's GDP shrank 3.8% in the former.

- August 15, 2009: Portugal

Portugal leaves recession after three consecutive quarters of negative growth having its GDP recover by 0.3% in the second quarter of 2009. According to the latest estimates by the Bank of Portugal, Portuguese GDP should fall around 3.5% in 2009, which is the worst figure for the country since 1975.

- August 15, 2009: Argentina

Even though official government sources state that Argentina's GDP will actually grow this year (and have only recognized a GDP shrinking in June of 0.4% and in July, of 0.3%; both compared to last year's same months), private consulting firms state that Argentine economy has actually been in recession since October 2008. According to them, Argentine GDP shrank 2.9% in the last quarter of 2008, 1.6% in the first quarter of 2009, and 0.6% in the second one. It's widely known in Argentina that the official statistics office in charge of producing this information, INDEC, is not very reliable for trustworthy statistical information, due to the government's mismanagement of the office.

- August 17, 2009: Japan

The Japanese Government informed that after fifteen continuous months of shrinking, and after the most disastrous fall since World War II of 4% between January and March, its GDP grew 3.7% in the second quarter of 2009 in comparison with the same quarter of 2008. In annual terms, Japanese GDP grew 0.9% between April and June. Recovery was mostly contributed to recovering demand in the manufacturing sector with exports growing 6.3%. Consumer spending had only increased by 0.8% in the same period.

- August 24, 2009: Thailand

Thai GDP grew 2.3% in 2009's second quarter, technically leaving the recession.

=== September ===
- September 9, 2009: Cyprus

Cyprus enters recession after 0.6% contraction in the first quarter, followed by 0.4% in the second quarter.

- September 11, 2009: Brazil

The Brazilian economy technically left the recession when GDP grew 1.9% in the second quarter of 2009 after having fallen in the first quarter of 2009 and last quarter of 2008. Growth surpassed what was expected by analysts, which was 1.6%.

- September 11, 2009: Sweden

Sweden emerges from the recession after witnessing GDP growth of 0.2% in the second quarter.

- September 21, 2009: (North Macedonia) Republic of Macedonia

The Republic of Macedonia officially enters the recession after experiencing a drop in GDP of 0.9% in the first quarter, followed by 1.4% in the second quarter.

=== October ===
- October 2, 2009: (Republic of Ireland) Ireland

The economic crisis in Ireland is considered to be the driving force behind the largest migration of Irish people to London in 20 years.

- October 23, 2009: United Kingdom

The UK markets had contracted by 0.4% in the third quarter against what was expected to be a period of growth, as a result of unexpectedly poor performance by the service sector.

=== November ===
- November 13, 2009: Netherlands

The Netherlands officially exits the recession after experiencing 0.4% growth in the third quarter, but recovery for the Netherlands still remains fragile as the country is highly dependent on exports to maintain the recovery.

- November 13, 2009: Germany, (European Union) Eurozone

Germany's growth of 0.7% in the third quarter helped lead the Eurozone out of the recession after providing overall growth of 0.4% in the same period, with the whole European Union growing 0.2%.

- November 14, 2009: Greece

The National Statistical Service of Greece states that the country had been in recession since the beginning of the year.

- November 20, 2009: Mexico

The Mexican government declared that its economy technically had left the recession when the Mexican GDP grew by 2.93% in the third quarter of 2009. Mexico had been in a severe economic crisis for over a year prior to its economic rebound. The Mexican government also approved a $244 billion budget for 2010, a slight increase from 2009.

- November 22, 2009: Venezuela

Venezuelan President Hugo Chavez states that the country has entered the recession as the economy contracted 4.5% in the third quarter.

- November 24, 2009: South Africa

The economy grew an annualised 0.9% in the third-quarter after dropping 7.4% in the second-quarter. The recovery was attributed to government spending and the construction industry.

- November 30, 2009: Canada

Canada begins its recovery from the recession. Economic growth is at 0.4% after 14 months of economic stagnation.

== 2010 ==
=== January ===
The late 2000s recession has entered its second full year of existence. While many nations have managed to climb out of the recession, employment is still sparse and promises to remain so throughout 2010.

- January 10, 2010: Canada

Canada continues its long and laborious recovery over its recession. However, people are starting to lose optimism due to the continued job losses. Only Manitoba has managed to create 2000 new jobs while the rest of the nation loses approximately 105,000. The previous month brought in 36,000 new part-time jobs at the expense of 71,000 full-time jobs.

- January 10, 2010: United States

The US economy is expected to get worse with more job cuts. This will expect to have some ramification with their northern neighbor Canada.

- January 12, 2010: Colombia

Colombia officially leaves the recession after achieving 2% economic growth in the last quarter of 2009.

- January 26, 2010: United Kingdom

After 6 consecutive quarters of negative GDP growth, the UK economy finally came out of recession with a GDP growth of 0.1%.

=== February ===
- February 5, 2010: Canada

Employment increased by 43,000 in January, all in part-time, pushing the unemployment rate down 0.1 percentage points to 8.3%. January marks the fourth employment gain in six months. Despite the recent increases, employment still remains 280,000 below the level of October 2008. Employment gains in January were driven by women aged 25 to 54 and youths. This was the first notable increase for youths since the start of the employment downturn in the fall of 2008. There were large increases in part-time employment in January, bringing it back to the level of six months earlier. Full-time employment was little changed in January, but has trended up over the last six months. January's increase was among private sector employees, while self-employment declined. Over the last six months, the number of private and public sector employees has been rising while self-employment has been little changed. The largest employment increases in January occurred in business, building and other support services, and retail and wholesale trade. These were partially offset by losses in professional, scientific, and technical services, as well as agriculture.

- February 22, 2010: Taiwan

Taiwan's economy exits from the recession with 9.22% growth in the last quarter of 2009 after increased demand from China and other key markets in the region.

- February 24, 2010: (European Union) Eurozone

Europe risks a double-dip recession after bad results emerged from France, Germany and Italy. The Eurozone only grew by 0.1% in the last quarter of 2009.

=== March ===
- March 2, 2010: Canada

The economy is rocketing further away from recession, increasing the chances that the Bank of Canada will lift borrowing costs more aggressively than expected later this year. Economic growth surged an annualized 5% in the fourth quarter, providing the clearest sign yet that a broad-based recovery is taking firm hold. It was the fastest annualized quarterly growth since 2000, and the first solidly positive quarter since the economy entered recession in 2008 amid a global pullback brought on by the 2008 financial crisis. The fourth-quarter surge was fuelled by everything from a strong housing sector and healthy consumer spending to a surprise turnaround for net trade as the country's exports grew at almost double the pace of imports, according to Statistics Canada.

- March 12, 2010: Canada

21,000 jobs were created in Canada as of February 2010. However, employers are still not hiring people in most places including Stelco and other jobs that are in rural areas like Norfolk County, Ontario.

- March 24, 2010: (North Macedonia) Republic of Macedonia

Last quarter expansion of 1.2% in 2009 officially brought the Republic of Macedonia out of the recession. Overall, the Republic of Macedonia's GDP contracted by 0.7% last year.

=== April ===
- April 2, 2010: United States

162,000 jobs were created in the United States, unemployment rate held steady at 9.7%.

- April 9, 2010: Canada

17,900 new jobs were created in Canada in the previous month. The trend is moving towards job creation instead of layoffs as seen in late 2008 and most of 2009. Jobs are being created in the private sector while public sector jobs are losing ground. Employment increased marginally in Ontario, Quebec, and Saskatchewan.

- April 15, 2010: Canada

The union vote ratification for Stelco Lake Erie Works was confirmed with 88.5% voting in favor of the three-year deal; keeping the place open for industry. As a result, numerous jobs in the local area were saved by this "eleventh hour" action.

=== May ===
- May 31, 2010: Canada

Canadian factories hummed, consumers bought more houses, governments spent more money, prices increased and the economy posted its best quarter of growth in more than 10 years. The Canadian economy expanded at an annualized rate of 6.1% in the first quarter, surpassing analyst expectations and marking the best growth rate since 1999. Economists had expected annualized GDP growth of 5.9% in the last quarter, up from 5% in last year's fourth quarter. The growth in the first quarter is the third straight quarter of economic expansion in Canada, coming on the heels of three consecutive quarters of contraction. March growth came in at 0.6%, ahead of the 0.5% estimate.

=== June ===
- June 9, 2010: Hungary

Hungary leaves the recession after experiencing 0.9% growth in the first quarter as a result of growing exports and effective government spending measures.

- June 9, 2010: Finland

Finland falls back into a state of recession after GDP contracted 0.4% in Q1 2010 and 0.2% in Q4 2009. The country witnessed negative growth of 7.8% in 2009, being the worst result since 1918. Apart from Luxembourg, Finland maintained EU fiscal policy by keeping debt at 44% of GDP, under the 60% limit.

=== July ===
- July 2, 2010: Canada

Twenty thousand new jobs were added to Canada's economy. The unemployment rate is expected to have stayed at 8.1%. Economists expect initiated home building was at an annual rate of 192,000 last month, up from 189,100 in May.

- July 23, 2010: United Kingdom

The ONS released preliminary figures showing that economic growth had accelerated from 0.3% in Q1 2010 to 1.1% in Q2. This is almost double the original forecast of 0.6% growth, and the news is a welcome surprise. In late August, this figure was revised up to 1.2% growth as a result of greater construction output. However, large budget cuts are being put into action by the new coalition government to tackle the £163bn budget deficit that the country faces.

=== August ===
- August 6, 2010: Canada

From April to June, Canada added a massive 225,000 jobs, over half of all of the year-over-year gains since July 2009, which has nearly brought Canada's employment to pre-recession levels. Now that growth is beginning to normalize, employment and gross domestic product growth paused in July. Canada's economy shed 9,000 jobs, pushing the employment rate up slightly to 8.0%. The 139,000 full-time jobs lost were largely offset by the 130,000 gained in part-time employment.

=== September ===
- September 8, 2010: Egypt

Egypt's Minister of Finance, Dr. Youssef Butros Ghali, states that Egypt emerged from the recession as indicated by increased total revenue from sales taxes and customs revenues.

- September 10, 2010: Canada

Statistics Canada said an additional 36,000 people got jobs in August, but the unemployment rate rose 0.1 percentage points, to 8.1%, as a larger number of people sought work. That raised the number of unemployed by 17,800, to slightly more than 1.5 million. Excluding the bounce in education jobs, employment actually fell by about 32,000, economists at BMO Capital Markets and CIBC said.

- September 20, 2010: United States

The National Bureau of Economic Research state that the US left the recession in June 2009, with managing director Lakshman Achuthan of the Economic Cycle Research Institute saying GDP recovered to 70% of the pre-recession level.

=== October ===
- October 31, 2010: Belgium

Belgium leaves the recession with 0.5% growth in the third quarter.

=== December ===
- December 7, 2010: Iceland

Iceland officially leaves the recession with growth of 1.2% in the third quarter.

== 2011 ==
=== January ===
- January 25, 2011 United Kingdom

It was announced the UK economy suffered a shock contraction of 0.5% in the fourth quarter of 2010, which has been widely blamed on the severe winter weather in December and austere budget cuts implemented by the coalition government increasing fears that the UK is heading for a double-dip recession. However, overall economic growth for 2010 was 1.4%.

=== February ===
- February 9, 2011 Latvia

Latvia leaves deep recession with an annualised growth of 3.7% in the last quarter of 2010, meaning the Latvian economy only shrank by 0.2% in 2010, compared to 18% in 2009.

- February 21, 2011 Thailand

Thailand's GDP rose 3.8% in the fourth quarter of 2010 after a minor recession caused by GDP contractions of 0.4% in the second quarter and 0.3% in the third quarter of 2010. The growth of the fourth quarter was attributed to a strengthening global economy, along with increasing income levels in the nation and greater liquidity by financial institutions to help the private sector. Full-year growth was recorded at 7.8%.

- February 23, 2011 Venezuela

Economists expressed concern with regards to Venezuela's economy improving due to instability in the private sector pressured by the socialist government, as José Guerra, former manager at the Central Bank of Venezuela, stated that private investment, accounting for half of Venezuela's GDP, dropped 2.2% in 2010.

=== March ===
- March 30, 2011: Wales

The global credit information group Experian highlighted in a report that the economic recovery for Wales is slower than the rest of the UK, stating a forecasted growth of 1.6% per year over the next decade as compared to 2.2% for the rest of the United Kingdom. Issues for Wales were attributed to low export rates, an unskilled workforce and low entrepreneurism, leading to less opportunities for growth.

=== May ===
- May 5, 2011: Portugal

Portugal's Minister of Finance Teixeira dos Santos warns that the upcoming bail-out package of €78 billion is expected to shift Portugal into recession for at least 2 years.

- May 6, 2011: United States

The US Department of Labor stated 244,000 jobs were created in April, with 235,000 added in February and 221,000 in March, but unemployment continued to grow, reaching 9%. For unemployment to be reduced to 6%, 13 million private sector jobs must be added over 3 years, meaning annual growth of 4-5% required.

- May 13, 2011: Portugal

Portugal slips into double-dip recession after the economy contracted by 0.7% in the first quarter of 2011, with a 0.6% contraction in the last quarter of 2010. The European Commission forecast Portugal's GDP will drop 2.2% in 2011, followed by a 1.8% drop in 2012, along with public debt to reach 101.7% of GDP in 2011 and 107.4% of GDP in 2012.

- May 13, 2011: Romania

Romania officially leaves the recession after 2 years following economic growth of an annualised 1.6% in the first quarter.

=== June ===
- June 24, 2011: Canada, China, European Union, United States

As house prices remain low in the US housing market, significant foreign purchases have been made by the Canadians, Chinese and Europeans (mainly French, Spanish and Italian), seeing total spending around US$16 billion. Housing prices fell 3% in the first quarter of the year, seeing housing sales increase 5.1% in March.

- June 24, 2011: Scotland

Recovery for Scotland from the recession is stifled by the risk of stagnation from a weak rate of recovery in exports and business investments.

=== July ===
- July 27, 2011: United Kingdom

After figures showed that the 0.5% contraction in Q4 2010 was cancelled out by a 0.5% rise in Q1 2011, growth estimates from the ONS suggest that the growth in the UK is slowing down, after figures of 0.2% GDP increase was posted. Sovereign debt in the Eurozone and EU cause the stock market to crash from a FTSE-100 high of 6100 points to just above 5000.

=== September ===
- September 15, 2011 Canada

The St. Thomas Assembly plant was closed permanently after decades of providing employing to the region of St. Thomas, Ontario; resulting in the loss of roughly 1,400 good-paying jobs.

=== November ===
- November 1, 2011 Canada

Bick's is closing down its tank farm in Delhi, Ontario in November 2011. One hundred and fifty full-time jobs will be lost by this move in addition to secondary industries and retailers.

== 2012 ==
=== March ===
- March 22, 2012: (Republic of Ireland) Ireland

Ireland returns to recession as GDP falls by 0.2% in the fourth quarter of 2011 following a fall of 1.1% in the third quarter.

=== April ===
- April 25, 2012: United Kingdom

The UK economy returns to recession with a fall of 0.2% in GDP in the first quarter of 2012 following a fall of 0.3% in the last quarter of 2011.

=== July ===
- July 25, 2012: United Kingdom

The double dip recession in the UK economy continues with a fall of 0.7% in GDP in the second quarter of 2012.

=== August ===
- August 14, 2012: Hungary

Hungary falls back into recession as GDP falls by 0.2% in the second quarter of 2012 following a fall of 1.0% in the first quarter.

=== October ===
- October 25, 2012: United Kingdom

The double dip recession in the UK economy ends with growth of 1.0% in GDP in the third quarter of 2012, with help from the London Olympic Games.

=== November ===
- November 15, 2012: (European Union) Eurozone

The Eurozone economy returns to recession with a fall of 0.1% in GDP in the third quarter of 2012 following a fall of 0.2% in the previous quarter.

=== December ===
- December 5, 2012: United Kingdom

In his Autumn Statement, Chancellor George Osborne cuts the UK growth forecast for 2013 to 1.2% from the 2% forecast in the budget.

- December 10, 2012: Japan

Japan is again in recession as the GDP figures for the second quarter of 2012 are revised to show a contraction of 0.03% and the third quarter figures fall by a further 0.9%.

== 2013 ==
=== January ===
- January 22, 2013: Japan

The Bank of Japan doubles its inflation target to 2% and announces open-ended asset purchases for 2014 in the hope of ending deflation.

- January 25, 2013: United Kingdom

Initial GDP figures for the fourth quarter of 2012 show the UK economy shrank by 0.3% raising fears of a triple dip recession.

=== February ===
- February 13, 2013: United Kingdom

Sir Mervyn King, Governor of the Bank of England, says he believes "a recovery is in sight". However, he also expects inflation to rise to at least 3% by the summer of 2013 and to remain above the Bank's 2% target for two years.

- February 14, 2013: European Union

The recession in the Eurozone economy deepens with a fall of 0.6% in GDP in the fourth quarter of 2012. Of the major economies, Germany shrinks by 0.6%, France by 0.3% and Italy by 0.9%. The economy of the 27 members of the EU, including non-Eurozone members such as Denmark and the UK, shrinks by 0.5%.

- February 14, 2013: Japan

Japan remains in recession as the economy shrinks by a further 0.1%.

- February 22, 2013: European Union

The European Commission forecast for 2013 expects growth of 0.1% across the 27 members of the EU but a contraction of 0.3% in the Eurozone economy.

- February 22, 2013: Bermuda

In its National Economic Report of Bermuda for 2012, the Bermudan Ministry of Finance expects GDP will decline by 0% to 1.5% in 2013 but five years of recession will end with "modest growth in 2014". GDP is thought to have contracted by 1.75% to 2.25% in 2012 after a decline of 2.8% in 2011.

- February 22, 2013: United Kingdom

The UK's AAA credit rating is downgraded by Moody's to AA+. The agency expects growth to "remain sluggish over the next few years".

=== March ===
- March 28, 2013: Cyprus

Banks in Cyprus re-open after having been closed for two weeks. The government of Cyprus agrees a 10 billion euro bailout deal with the EU and IMF. Depositors with more than € 100,000 in certain banks will lose up to 60% of their deposits. An earlier proposal that would have seen depositors with less than €100,000 losing 6.75% of their deposits fails to attract a single vote in favor in the Cypriot parliament. Russia is expected to help finance the bailout by delaying the repayment of a 2.5 billion euro loan to Cyprus until 2021.
