= Nanticoke Solar Facility =

44 MW solar power station in Canada

- Country: Canada
- Location: Nanticoke, Ontario
- Coordinates: 42°48′0″N 80°3′1″W
- Status: Operational
- Construction began: 2018
- Commission date: 2019
- Owner: Nanticoke Solar LP

Solar farm
- Type: Flat-panel PV
- Site area: 158 hectares (390 acres)

Power generation
- Units operational: 192,431
- Nameplate capacity: 44 MW

The Nanticoke Solar Facility is a 44 MW solar power station in Nanticoke, Ontario, Canada. It is located on the site of the defunct Nanticoke Generating Station, which operated from 1972 to 2013 and was the largest coal-fired power plant in North America.

The facility is owned and operated by Nanticoke Solar LP, a joint venture of Ontario Power Generation (80%), the Six Nations of the Grand River Development Corporation (15%), and the Mississaugas of the Credit First Nation (5%).

== History ==
The Nanticoke Solar Facility and its predecessor, the Nanticoke Generating Station, is built on the site of the 1813 Battle of Nanticoke in which the Norfolk volunteer militia routed a band of American marauders that had been pillaging area farms and terrorizing Upper Canada. The site was designated a National Historic Site of Canada in 1924. Following the phase-out of coal power in the province, Ontario Power Generation announced in July 2015 that it would not be converting the facility to biomass or natural gas and that the remaining equipment would be sold or repurposed elsewhere. The two smokestacks were imploded by controlled demolition on February 28, 2018.

Ontaroo Power Generation established Nanticoke Solar LP as a joint venture with First Nations to build and operate a new solar facility on the site. The Nanticoke Solar Facility is Ontario Power Generation's first solar facility. Contracts were let in 2016, and construction began in 2018. The 192,000-panel solar farm was completed in March 2019, but the demolition of the old Nanticoke Generating Station structures continued even after construction had ben completed of the solar facility. The last sections of the generating station were demolished on August 22, 2019.

== See also ==
- List of power stations in Canada
- Science and technology in Canada
