= Nanticoke Generating Station =

Former coal-fired power station in Nanticoke, Ontario, Canada

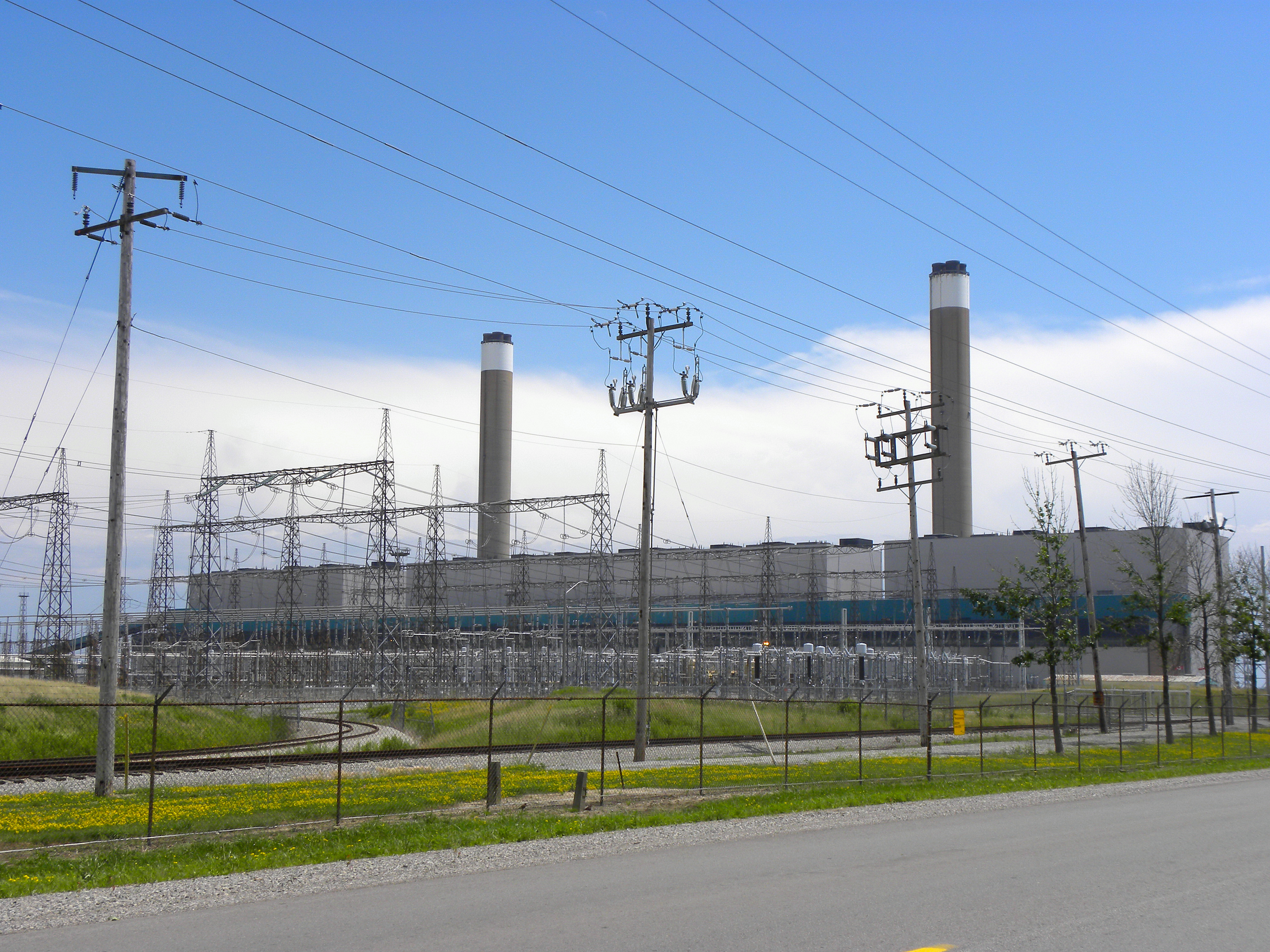
- Country: Canada
- Location: Nanticoke, Haldimand County, Ontario
- Coordinates: 42°48′0″N 80°3′1″W
- Status: Decommissioned
- Construction began: 1967
- Commission date: 1972–1978
- Decommission date: 2013
- Owner: Ontario Power Generation
- Operator: Ontario Power Generation

Thermal power station
- Primary fuel: Sub-bituminous coal
- Turbine technology: Steam turbine
- Cooling source: Lake Erie

Power generation
- Units decommissioned: 8 × 500 MW
- Nameplate capacity: 3964 MW (8 units); 1880 MW (4 units)
- Capacity factor: 69% (peak)
- Annual net output: 24,000 GWh (peak)

External links
- Commons: Related media on Commons

The Nanticoke Generating Station was a coal-fired power station in Nanticoke, Ontario in operation from 1972 to 2013. It was the largest coal power station in North America. At full capacity, it could provide 3,964 MW of power into the southern Ontario power grid from its base in Nanticoke, Ontario, Canada, and it provided as much as 15% of Ontario's electricity.

It was decommissioned in 2013 as part of the Government of Ontario's commitment to eliminate coal power. A 44 MW photovoltaic power station, the Nanticoke Solar Facility, was built on the site and entered service in 2019.

Prior to the commencement of decommissioning, Nanticoke was one of Canada's top ten single sources of greenhouse gases.

== History ==
The Nanticoke Generating Station was built on the site of the Battle of Nanticokein which in 1813, the Norfolk volunteer militia routed a band of American marauders who had been pillaging area farms and terrorizing the country, an exploit that inspired the British military forces and the people of Upper Canada during the War of 1812. The site was designated a National Historic Site of Canada in 1924.

Ontario Hydro revealed plans to build a 4,000 MW fossil-fuel generating station near Long Point in 1967. Its current site was selected in Nanticoke, Ontario, because of the nearby harbour, the proximity of American coal supplies, and the proximity to much of Ontario's population. The construction of the plant cost CAN$800 million, and operations started in 1972. Eight pulverized coal-fired steam generators were built in phases between 1973 and 1978.

By 1981, the plant was consuming 35,000 tonnes of coal per day. Over the years, another $900 million was invested in making the plant more energy efficient, robust, and improving its emissions.

== Plant operations ==
=== Power generation and distribution ===
At full capacity (4000 MW), with all eight generating units functioning, the station's annual electricity production had been as high as 24 billion kilowatt-hours (kWh), enough electricity to run nearly 2.5 million households. Although the plant housed eight generating units, four of those units were retired previously prior to the plant's overall closure. (Two were retired in 2010, and two were retired in 2011.) The remaining four units are not in operation.

Previously, power generation at this plant had been on a stand-by basis and operated only during peak levels of energy consumption or when other generating facilities are unavailable. At other times the plant would remain idle. When demand for electricity was high, the remaining four active generating units were put into service, with the maximum potential to produce approximately 5% of Ontario's total generating capacity (1880 MW the 34,079 MW of existing power generation in the province as of January 2012). The plant is connected to the power grid by numerous 230,000 V and 500,000 V transmission lines.

Cooling water for the plant was drawn from Lake Erie by using two pipes that were6.5 m in diameter, stretched 550 m offshore, and sat 10 m below the surface. The plant had two multi-flue smokestacks, which were 198 m (650 ft) tall. A dock on the shore of the site allowd ships to deliver coal to an on-site stock pile, which could hold up to 4.5 MT.

At its peak, Nanticoke employed approximately 634 staff from Haldimand and Norfolk Counties.

=== Emissions ===
The Nanticoke station was one of Canada's largest greenhouse gas emitters and polluters. In 2001, it was the largest single source of greenhouse gases, according to Environment Canada. Major reductions in output since 2009 caused it to be eventually surpassed by facilities in Alberta.

Greenhouse Gases (2013)
Greenhouse gas	Amount (tonnes)	Carbon dioxide equivalent*
CO_{2}	1,530,237	1,530,237
CH_{4}	24.80	620
N_{2}O	27.30	8,135
Total	-	1,538,992
*Calculated figures for CO_{2}e are rounded to the nearest tonne.

Total emissions, 2004–2014
Year	Emissions (tonnes CO_{2}e)
2004	14,715,952
2005	17,629,437
2006	16,271,466
2007	17,887,649
2008	15,427,913
2009	6,037,137
2010	8,601,215
2011	2,836,299
2012	2,021,667
2013	1,538,992
2014	0*
* Facility shut down in 2013

=== Decommissioning ===
The Government of Ontario had originally targeted to phase out all of its coal plants by 2009 but abandoned that target in 2006, to the ire of organizations representing nurses and physicians, community groups, and environment groups. The province could not replace Nanticoke's energy output by the deadline although Units 3 and 4 at Bruce A being brought back online between 2003 and 2004. The province was examining replacing its output using nuclear power by refurbishing its existing fleet and building two additional reactors at the Darlington Nuclear Generating Station. Bruce Power, Canada's only private nuclear power company, also proposed building two reactors on former Stelco lands in Nanticoke. However, that was met with immediate opposition and dismissal from the government. "It's a speculative move on the part of a private company...It doesn't enjoy the support, encouragement [or] approval...of the Government of Ontario," stated George Smitherman, Minister of Energy and Infrastructure. Bruce Power, however, moved ahead with the refurbishment of "A" Units 1 and 2 in 2005, and Ontario Power Generation started refurbishing Darlington in 2016.

Two units at Nanticoke were shut down in fall 2010. Two others were shut down in 2011. The final four were shut down on December 31, 2013. That was made possible, in part, by the reactivation of Units 1 and 2 at Bruce Nuclear Generating Station the previous year. In July 2015, Ontario Power Generation announced it would no longer "preserve and staff Nanticoke", and that it expected that the plant would be permanently decommissioned. Its two smokestacks were imploded by controlled demolition on February 28, 2018. The last sections were demolished on August 22, 2019.

== See also ==
- List of power stations in Canada
- Science and technology in Canada
