= Great Recession in the United States =

Major economic downturn in the United States

In the United States, the Great Recession was a severe financial crisis combined with a deep recession. While the recession officially lasted from December 2007 to June 2009, it took many years for the economy to recover to pre-crisis levels of employment and output. This slow recovery was due in part to households and financial institutions paying off debts accumulated in the years preceding the crisis along with restrained government spending following initial stimulus efforts. It followed the bursting of the housing bubble, the housing market correction and subprime mortgage crisis.

According to the Department of Labor, roughly 8.7 million jobs (about 7%) were shed from February 2008 to February 2010, and real GDP contracted by 4.2% between Q4 2007 and Q2 2009, making the Great Recession the worst economic downturn since the Great Depression. The GDP bottom, or trough, was reached in the second quarter of 2009 (marking the technical end of the recession that is defined by "a period of falling economic activity spread across the economy, lasting more than a few months, normally visible in real GDP, real income, employment, industrial production, and wholesale-retail sales"). Real (inflation-adjusted) GDP did not regain its pre-crisis (Q4 2007) peak level until Q3 2011. Unemployment rose from 4.7% in November 2007 to peak at 10% in October 2009, before returning steadily to 4.7% in May 2016. The total number of jobs did not return to November 2007 levels until May 2014. Some areas, such as jobs in public health, have not recovered as of 2023.

Households and non-profit organizations added approximately $8 trillion in debt during the 2000–2008 period (roughly doubling it and fueling the housing bubble), then reduced their debt level from the peak in Q3 2008 until Q3 2012, the only period this debt declined since at least the 1950s. However, the debt held by the public rose from 35% GDP in 2007 to 77% GDP by 2016, as the government spent more while the private sector (e.g., households and businesses, particularly the banking sector) reduced the debt burdens accumulated during the pre-recession decade. President Barack Obama declared the bailout measures started under the Bush administration and continued during his administration as completed and mostly profitable as of December 2014.

== Background ==
After the Great Depression of the 1930s, the American economy experienced robust growth, with periodic lesser recessions, for the rest of the 20th century. The federal government enforced the Securities Exchange Act (1934) and The Chandler Act (1938), which tightly regulated the financial markets. The Securities Exchange Act of 1934 regulated the trading of the secondary securities market and The Chandler Act regulated the transactions in the banking sector.

There were a few investment banks, small by current standards, that expanded during the late 1970s, such as JP Morgan. The Reagan administration in the early 1980s began a thirty-year period of financial deregulation. The financial sector sharply expanded, in part because investment banks were going public, bringing them vast sums of stockholder capital. From 1978 to 2008, the average salary for workers outside of investment banking in the U.S. increased from $40k to $50k – a 25 percent salary increase - while the average salary in investment banking increased from $40k to $100k – a 150 percent salary increase. Deregulation also precipitated financial fraud - often tied to real estate investments - sometimes on a grand scale, such as the savings and loan crisis. By the end of the 1980s, many workers in the financial sector were being jailed for fraud, but many Americans were losing their life savings. Large investment banks began merging and developing financial conglomerates; this led to the formation of the giant investment banks like Goldman Sachs.

== Early suggestions ==
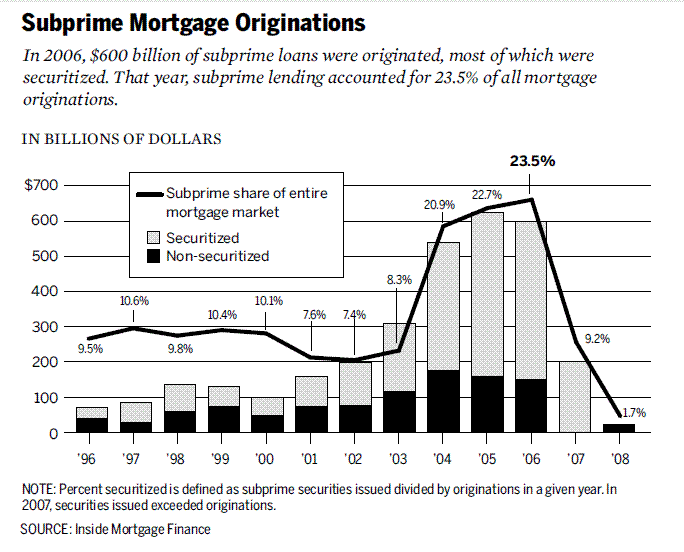
Subprime mortgage lending jumped dramatically during the 2004–2006 period preceding the crisis (source: Financial Crisis Inquiry Commission Report, p. 70 Figure 5.2).

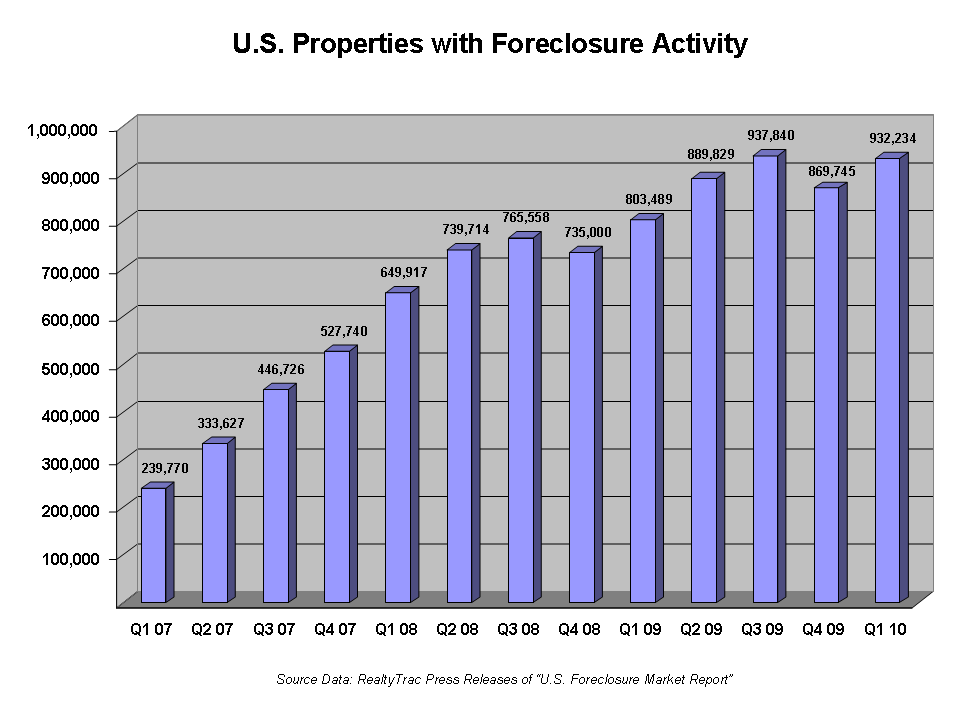
Number of U.S. household properties subject to foreclosure actions by quarter

In the early months of 2008, many observers believed that a U.S. recession had begun. The collapse of Bear Stearns and the resulting financial market turbulence signaled that the crisis would not be mild and brief.

Alan Greenspan, ex-Chairman of the Federal Reserve, stated in March 2008 that the 2008 financial crisis in the United States "is likely to be judged in retrospect as the most wrenching since the end of World War II". A chief economist at Standard & Poor's said in March 2008 he had projected a worst-case-scenario in which the country would endure a double-dip recession, in which the economy would briefly recover in the summer 2008, before plunging again. Under this scenario, the economy's total output, as measured by the gross domestic product (GDP), would drop by 2.2 percentage points, making it among the worst recessions in the post World War II period.

The former head of the National Bureau of Economic Research said in March 2008 that he believed the country was then in a recession, and it could be a severe one. A number of private economists generally predicted a mild recession ending in the summer of 2008 when the economic stimulus checks going to 130 million households started being spent. A chief economist at Moody's predicted in March 2008 that policymakers would act in a concerted and aggressive way to stabilize the financial markets, and that the economy would suffer, but not enter a prolonged and severe recession. It takes many months before the National Bureau of Economic Research, the unofficial arbiter of when recessions begin and end, would make its own ruling.

According to numbers published by the Bureau of Economic Analysis in May 2008, the GDP growth of the previous two quarters was positive. As one common definition of a recession is negative economic growth for at least two consecutive fiscal quarters, some analysts suggested this indicates that the U.S. economy was not in a recession at the time. However, this estimate has been disputed by analysts who argue that if inflation is taken into account, the GDP growth was negative for those two quarters, making it a technical recession. In a May 9, 2008 report, the chief North American economist for investment bank Merrill Lynch wrote that despite the GDP growth reported for the first quarter of 2008, "it is still reasonable to believe that the recession started some time between September and January", on the grounds that the National Bureau of Economic Research's four recession indicators all peaked during that period.

New York's budget director concluded the state of New York was officially in a recession by the summer of 2008. Governor David Paterson called an emergency economic session of the state legislature for August 19 to push a budget cut of $600 million on top of a hiring freeze and a 7 percent reduction in spending at state agencies that had already been implemented by the Governor. An August 1 report, issued by economists with Wachovia Bank, said Florida was officially in a recession.

White House budget director Jim Nussle maintained at that time that the U.S. had avoided a recession, following revised GDP numbers from the Commerce Department showing a 0.2 percent contraction in the fourth quarter of 2007 down from a 0.6 percent increase, and a downward revision to 0.9 percent from 1 percent in the first quarter of 2008. The GDP for the second quarter was placed at a 1.9 percent expansion, below an expected 2 percent. On the other hand, Martin Feldstein, who headed the National Bureau of Economic Research and served on the group's recession-dating panel, said he believed the U.S. was in a very long recession and that there was nothing the Federal Reserve could do to change it.

In a CNBC interview at the end of July 2008, Alan Greenspan said he believed the U.S. was not yet in a recession, but that it could enter one due to a global economic slowdown.

A study released by Moody's found two-thirds of the 381 largest metropolitan areas in the United States were in a recession. The study also said 28 states were in recession, with 16 at risk. The findings were based on unemployment figures and industrial production data.

In March 2008, financier Warren Buffett stated in a CNBC interview that by a "common sense definition", the U.S. economy was already in a recession. Buffett has also stated that the definition of recession is flawed and that it should be three consecutive quarters of GDP growth that is less than population growth. However, the U.S. only experienced two consecutive quarters of GDP growth less than population growth.

== Causes ==
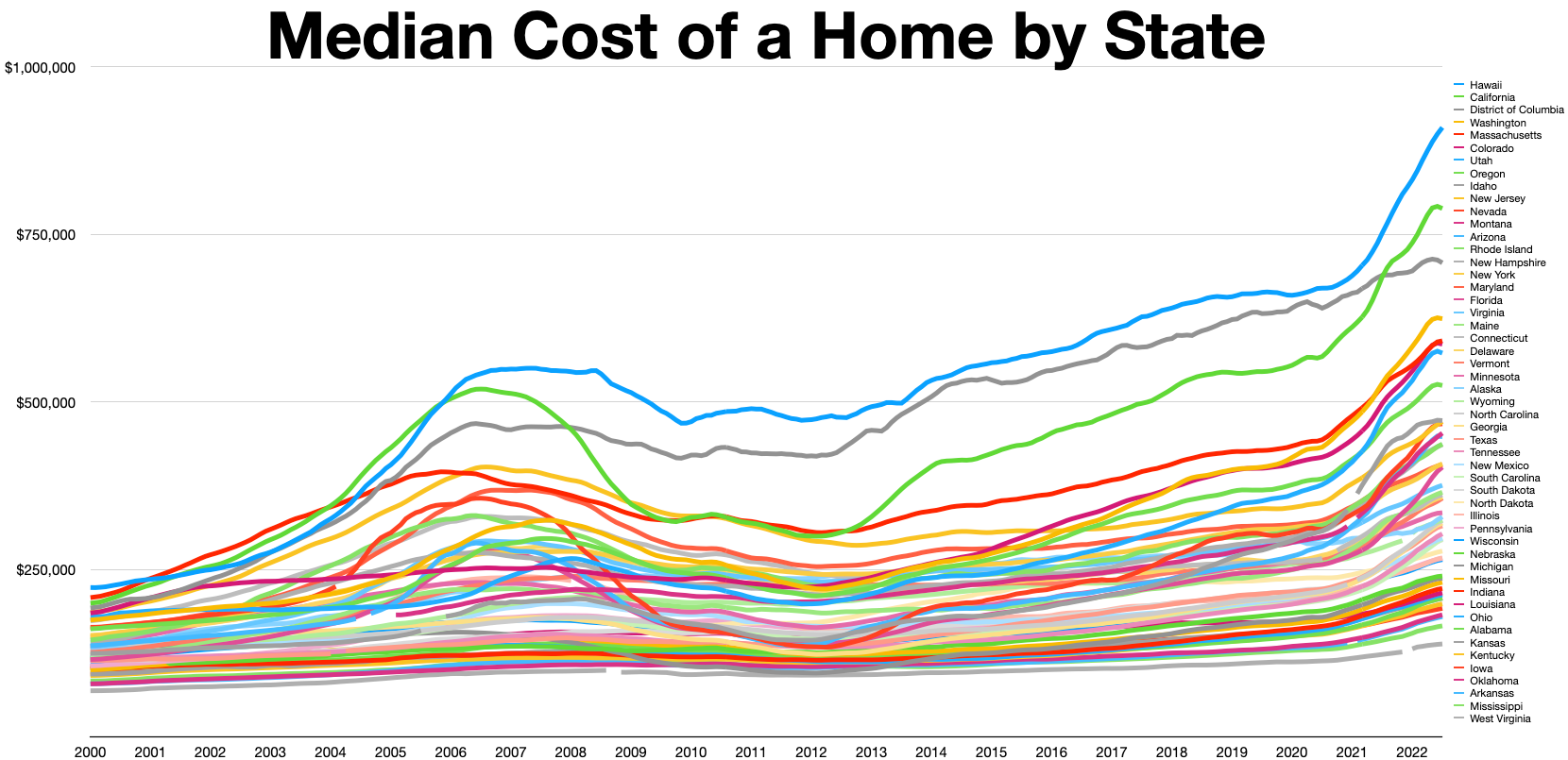
Cost of housing by State

Federal Reserve Chair Ben Bernanke testified in September 2010 regarding the causes of the crisis. He wrote that there were shocks or triggers (i.e., particular events that touched off the crisis) and vulnerabilities (i.e., structural weaknesses in the financial system, regulation and supervision) that amplified the shocks. Examples of triggers included: losses on subprime mortgage securities that began in 2007 and a run on the shadow banking system that began in mid-2007, which adversely affected the functioning of money markets. Examples of vulnerabilities in the private sector included: financial institution dependence on unstable sources of short-term funding such as repurchase agreements or Repos; deficiencies in corporate risk management; excessive use of leverage (borrowing to invest); and inappropriate usage of derivatives as a tool for taking excessive risks. Examples of vulnerabilities in the public sector included: statutory gaps and conflicts between regulators; ineffective use of regulatory authority; and ineffective crisis management capabilities. Bernanke also discussed "Too big to fail" institutions, monetary policy, and trade deficits.

The U.S. Financial Crisis Inquiry Commission reported its findings in January 2011. It concluded that "the crisis was avoidable and was caused by: Widespread failures in financial regulation, including the Federal Reserve's failure to stem the tide of toxic mortgages; Dramatic breakdowns in corporate governance including too many financial firms acting recklessly and taking on too much risk; An explosive mix of excessive borrowing and risk by households and Wall Street that put the financial system on a collision course with crisis; Key policy makers ill prepared for the crisis, lacking a full understanding of the financial system they oversaw; and systemic breaches in accountability and ethics at all levels."

Among the important catalysts of the subprime crisis were the influx of money from the private sector, the banks entering into the mortgage bond market, government policies aimed at expanding homeownership, speculation by many home buyers, and the predatory lending practices of the mortgage lenders, specifically the adjustable-rate mortgage (the 2–28 loan, with a fixed 2 years and 28 years of adjustable rates), that mortgage lenders sold directly or indirectly via mortgage brokers. On Wall Street and in the financial industry, moral hazard lay at the core of many of the causes.

=== Government policies ===
A federal inquiry found that some federal government policies (or lack of them) were responsible to a large extent for the recession in the United States and the resultant vast unemployment. Factors include:

"Members of the Right tried to blame the seeming market failures on government; in their mind the government effort to push people with low incomes into home ownership was the source of the problem. Widespread as this belief has become in conservative circles, virtually all serious attempts to evaluate the evidence have concluded that there is little merit in this view."

— Joseph Stiglitz
- The non-depository banking system was not subject to the same risk-taking regulations as the depository banks. The top 5 investment banks at the core of the crisis, called the Gang of Five (Bear Stearns, Lehman Brothers, Merrill Lynch, Goldman Sachs, and Morgan Stanley) had accumulated approximately $4 trillion in debt by 2007 with a high leverage ratio (25:1 or higher) meaning a 4% decline in the value of their assets would render them insolvent. Many housing securities in their portfolios became worthless during the crisis. They were also vulnerable to disruptions in their short-term financing (often overnight in Repo markets). They had been encouraged to add to their debt by the SEC in an April 28, 2004 meeting.
- Giving Fannie Mae & Freddie Mac GSE status allowed Fannie Mae and Freddie Mac to borrow money in the bond market at lower rates (yields) than other financial institutions. With their funding advantage, they purchased and invested in huge numbers of mortgages and mortgage-backed securities, and they did so with lower capital requirements than other regulated financial institutions and banks. Fannie Mae and Freddie Mac began to experience large losses on their retained portfolios, especially on their Alt-A and subprime investments. In 2008, the sheer size of their retained portfolios and mortgage guarantees led the Federal Housing Finance Agency to conclude that they would soon be insolvent. Under GSE status, Fannie Mae and Freddie Mac's debt and credit guarantees grew so large that 90 percent of all residential mortgages were financed through Fannie and Freddie or the Federal Housing Administration.

=== Role of Alan Greenspan ===
Those of us who have looked to the self-interest of lending institutions to protect shareholders' equity, myself included, are in a state of shocked disbelief.

— Alan Greenspan

Alan Greenspan was the Chairman of the Federal Reserve of the United States from 1987 to 2006. He was appointed by President Ronald Reagan in August 1987 and was reappointed by President Bill Clinton in 1996. Some commentators blamed him as the individual most singly responsible for the housing bubble in the U.S.. Greenspan himself admitted that he did not apprehend the full extent of the problem until after it was too late, saying that "I really didn't get it until very late in 2005 and 2006." Greenspan stated that the housing bubble was "fundamentally engendered by the decline in real long-term interest rates", though he also claims that long-term interest rates are beyond the control of central banks because "the market value of global long-term securities is approaching $100 trillion" and thus these and other asset markets are large enough that they "now swamp the resources of central banks".

Greenspan admitted to a congressional committee that he had been "partially wrong" in his hands-off approach towards the banking industry - "I made a mistake in presuming that the self-interests of organisations, specifically banks and others, were such that they were best capable of protecting their own shareholders and their equity in the firms," said Greenspan. That being said, the Federal Reserve did not have the power to wade into the banking sector at the time.

== Recession declared by economists ==
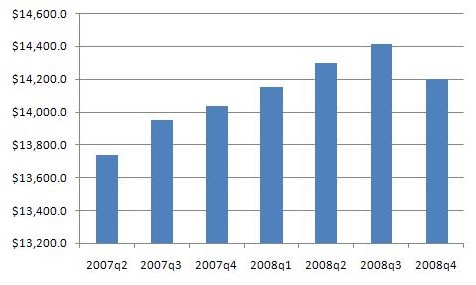
U.S. Real GDP in Billions of Current USD. Courtesy of www.bea.gov

On December 1, 2008, the National Bureau of Economic Research (NBER) declared that the United States entered a recession in December 2007, citing employment and production figures as well as the third quarter decline in GDP. The Dow Jones Industrial Average lost 679 points that same day. On January 4, 2009, Nobel Memorial Prize–winning economist Paul Krugman wrote, "This looks an awful lot like the beginning of a second Great Depression."

=== Rise in unemployment ===
The Great Recession cost millions of jobs initially and high unemployment lingered for years after the official end of the recession in June 2009. One of the frightening aspects was how deep the recession would go, which is one reason Congress passed and President Obama signed the American Recovery and Reinvestment Act (ARRA) in January 2009. Known as "The Stimulus", ARRA was a roughly $800 billion mix of tax cuts (about one-third) and spending programs (about two-thirds) with the primary impact spread over three years. Many economists argued the stimulus was too small, while conservatives such as the Tea Party argued that deficit reduction was the priority.

The number of jobs ("total non-farm payrolls" which includes both private sector and government jobs) reached a peak of 138.4 million in January 2008, then fell to a trough (bottom) of 129.7 million in February 2010, a decline of nearly 8.8 million jobs or 6.8%. The number of jobs did not regain the January 2008 level until May 2014. For comparison, the severe 1981-82 recession had a jobs decline of 3.2%. Full-time employment did not regain its pre-crisis level until August 2015.

The unemployment rate ("U-3") rose from the pre-recession level of 4.7% in November 2008 to a peak of 10.0% in October 2009, before steadily falling back to the pre-recession level by May 2016. One factor to consider is that the job count was artificially high and the unemployment rate was artificially low prior to the recession due to an unsustainable housing bubble, which had increased construction and other employment substantially. In 2003, prior to the significant expansion of subprime lending of 2004-2006, the unemployment rate was close to 6%. The wider measure of unemployment ("U-6") which includes those employed part-time for economic reasons or marginally attached to the labor force rose from 8.4% pre-crisis to a peak of 17.1% in October 2009. It did not regain the pre-crisis level until May 2017.

Bloomberg maintains a "dashboard" of several labor-market variables that illustrates the state of recovery of the labor market.

=== Liquidity crisis ===
The major investment banks at the core of the crisis obtained significant funding in overnight repo markets, which were disrupted during the crisis. In effect, there was a run on the essentially unregulated shadow banking (non-depository) banking system, which had grown larger than the regulated depository system. Unable to obtain financing, they merged (in the case of Bear Stearns and Merrill Lynch), declared bankruptcy (Lehman Brothers) or obtained federal depository bank charters and private loans (Goldman Sachs and Morgan Stanley). Insurer AIG, which had guaranteed many of the liabilities of these and other banks around the globe through derivatives called credit default swaps, also was bailed out and taken over by the government at an initial cost exceeding $100 billion. The bailout of AIG was essentially a conduit for the U.S. government to bail out banks around the world, as the money was used by AIG to make good on its obligations.

A timeline of some of the significant events in the crisis from 2007 to 2008 includes:

- From late 2007 through September 2008, before the official October 3 bailout, there was a series of smaller bank rescues that occurred which totaled almost $800 billion.
- In summer 2007, Countrywide Financial drew down an $11 billion line of credit and then secured an additional $12 billion bailout in September. This may be considered the start of the crisis.
- In mid-December 2007, Washington Mutual bank cut more than 3,000 jobs and closed its sub-prime mortgage business.
- In mid-March 2008, Bear Stearns was bailed out by a gift of $29 billion non-recourse treasury bill debt assets.
- In early July 2008, depositors at the Los Angeles offices of IndyMac Bank frantically lined up in the street to withdraw their money. On July 11, IndyMac, a spinoff of Countrywide, was seized by federal regulators—and called for a $32 billion bailout—as the mortgage lender succumbed to the pressures of tighter credit, tumbling home prices and rising foreclosures. That day the financial markets plunged as investors tried to gauge whether the government would attempt to save mortgage lenders Fannie Mae and Freddie Mac. The two were placed into conservatorship on September 7, 2008.
- During the weekend of September 13–14, 2008, Lehman Brothers declared bankruptcy after failing to find a buyer; Bank of America agreed to purchase investment bank Merrill Lynch; the insurance giant AIG sought a bridge loan from the Federal Reserve; and a consortium of 10 banks created an emergency fund of at least $70 billion to deal with the effects of Lehman's closure, similar to the consortium put forth by J.P. Morgan during the stock market panic of 1907 and the crash of 1929. Stocks on Wall Street tumbled on Monday, September 15.
- On September 16, 2008, news emerged that the Federal Reserve might give AIG an $85 billion rescue package; on September 17, 2008, this was confirmed. The terms of the package were that the Federal Reserve would receive an 80% public stake in the firm. The biggest bank failure in history occurred on September 25 when JP Morgan Chase agreed to purchase the banking assets of Washington Mutual.

The year 2008, as of September 17, had seen 81 public corporations file for bankruptcy in the United States, already higher than the 78 for all of 2007. The largest corporate bankruptcy in U.S. history also made 2008 a record year in terms of assets, with Lehman's size—$691 billion (~$1.01 trillion in 2025) in assets—alone surpassing all past annual totals. The year also saw the ninth-biggest bankruptcy, with the failure of IndyMac Bank.

The Wall Street Journal stated that venture capital funding slowed down, which in the past had led to unemployment and slowed new job creation. The Federal Reserve took steps to feed economic expansion by lowering the prime rate repeatedly during 2008.

Federal reserve rates changes
Date	Primary discount rate	Secondary discount rate	Fed funds rate
Apr 30, 2008	2.25%	2.75%	2.00%
Mar 18, 2008	2.50%	3.00%	2.25%
Mar 16, 2008	3.25%	3.75%	2.25%
Jan 30, 2008	3.50%	4.00%	3.00%
Jan 22, 2008	4.00%	4.50%	3.50%

=== Bailout of U.S. financial system ===
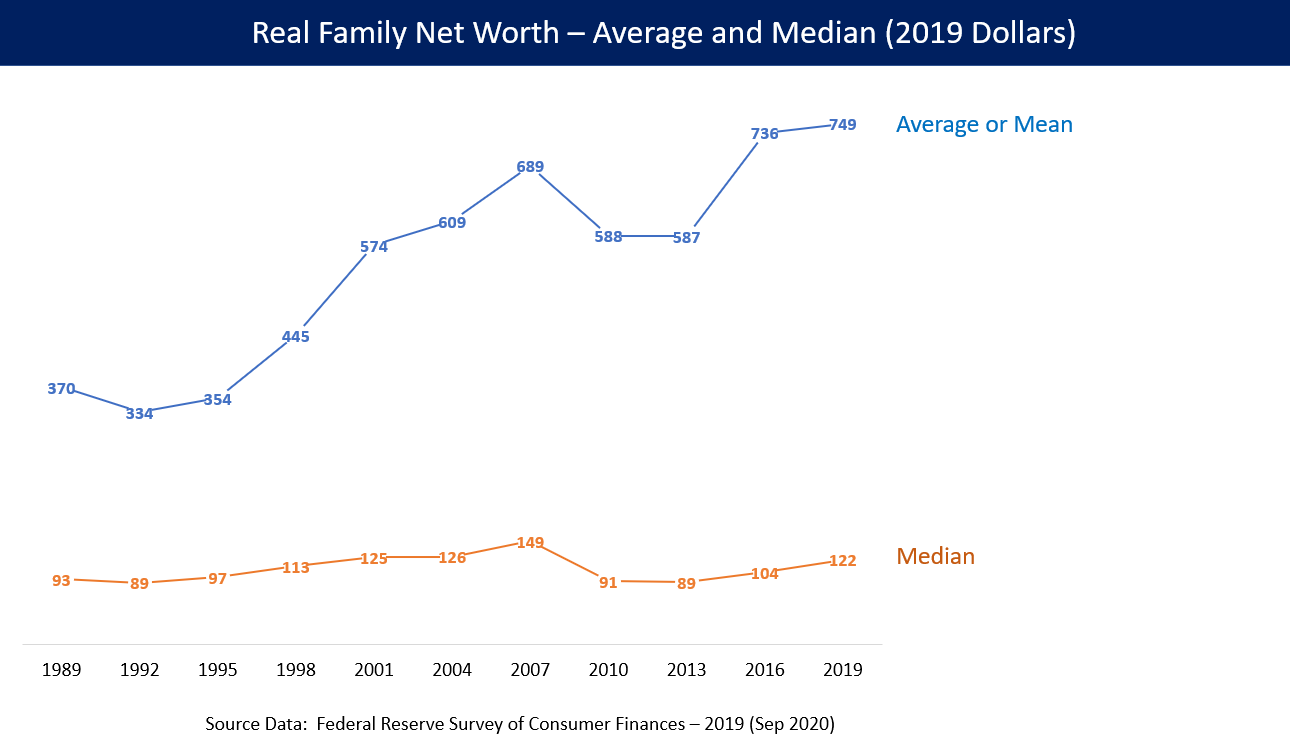
U.S. median family net worth peaked in 2007, declined due to the Great Recession until 2013, and only partially recovered by 2016. Homeowners did not receive bailout support on the scale of financial institutions.

On September 17, 2008, Federal Reserve chairman Ben Bernanke advised Secretary of the Treasury Henry Paulson that a large amount of public money would be needed to stabilize the financial system. Short selling on 799 financial stocks was banned on September 19. Companies were also forced to disclose large short positions. The Treasury Secretary also indicated that money funds would create an insurance pool to cover themselves against losses and that the government would buy mortgage-backed securities from banks and investment houses. Initial estimates of the cost of the Treasury bailout proposed by the Bush administration's draft legislation (as of September 19, 2008) were in the range of $700 billion to $1 trillion U.S. dollars. President George W. Bush asked Congress on September 20, 2008 for the authority to spend as much as $700 billion (~$1.03 trillion in 2025) to purchase troubled mortgage assets and contain the 2008 financial crisis. The crisis continued when the United States House of Representatives rejected the bill and the Dow Jones took a 777-point plunge. A revised version of the bill was later passed by Congress, but the stock market continued to fall nevertheless. The first half of the bailout money was primarily used to buy preferred stock in banks, instead of troubled mortgage assets. This flew in the face of some economists' argument that buying preferred stock would be far less effective than buying common stock.

As of mid-November 2008, it was estimated that the new loans, purchases, and liabilities of the Federal Reserve, the Treasury, and FDIC, brought on by the 2008 financial crisis, totalled over $5 trillion: $1 trillion in loans by the Fed to broker-dealers through the emergency discount window, $1.8 trillion in loans by the Fed through the Term Auction Facility, $700 billion to be raised by the Treasury for the Troubled Assets Relief Program, $200 billion insurance for the GSEs by the Treasury, and $1.5 trillion insurance for unsecured bank debt by FDIC.

ProPublica maintains a "bailout tracker" that indicated about $626 billion was "spent, invested or loaned" in bailouts of the financial system due to the crisis as of March 2018, while $713 billion had been repaid to the government ($390 billion in principal repayments and $323 billion in interest) indicating the bailouts generated $87 billion in profit.

== United States policy responses ==
The Federal Reserve, Treasury, and Securities and Exchange Commission took several steps on September 19 to intervene in the crisis. To stop the potential run on money market mutual funds, the Treasury also announced on September 19 a new $50,000,000,000 ($50 billion) program to ensure the investments, similar to the Federal Deposit Insurance Corporation (FDIC) program. Part of the announcements included temporary exceptions to section 23A and 23B (Regulation W), allowing financial groups to more easily share funds within their group. The exceptions would expire on January 30, 2009, unless extended by the Federal Reserve Board. The Securities and Exchange Commission announced the termination of short-selling of 799 financial stocks, as well as action against naked short selling, as part of its reaction to the mortgage crisis.

== Recovery ==
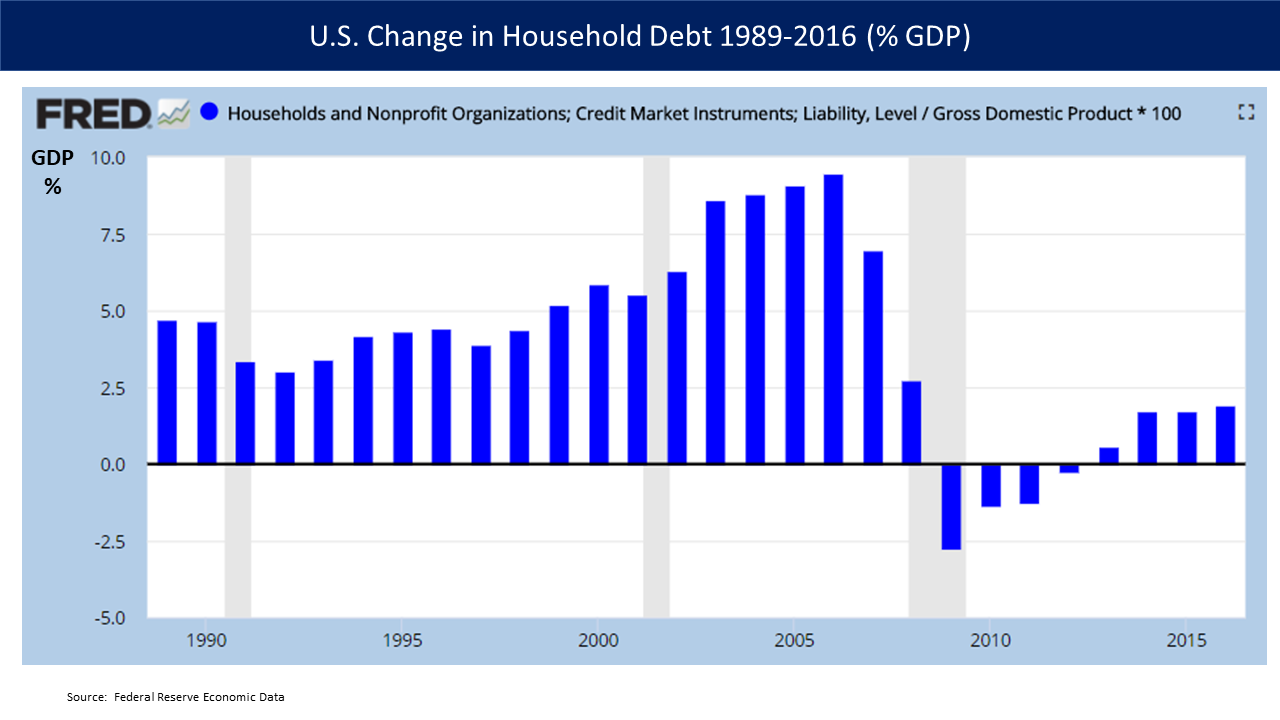
U.S. changes in household debt as a percentage of GDP for 1989-2016. Recoveries from financial crises tend to be protracted, as debt levels must be reduced before typical borrow-and-spend patterns are resumed. In this case, homeowners paid down debt from 2009-2012.

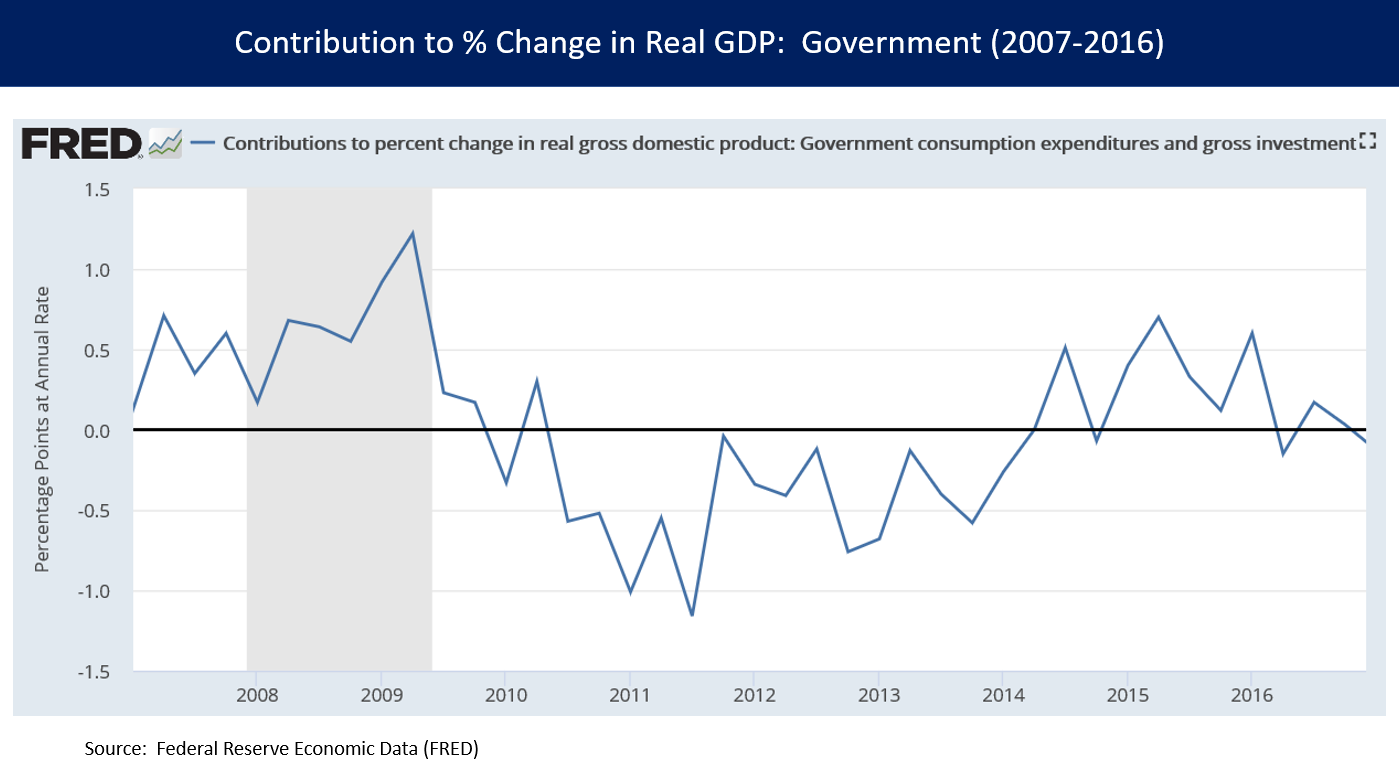
U.S. federal government spending was held relatively level around $3.5 trillion from 2009-2014, which created a headwind to recovery, reducing real GDP growth by approximately 0.5% per quarter (annualized) on average between Q3 2010 and Q2 2014.

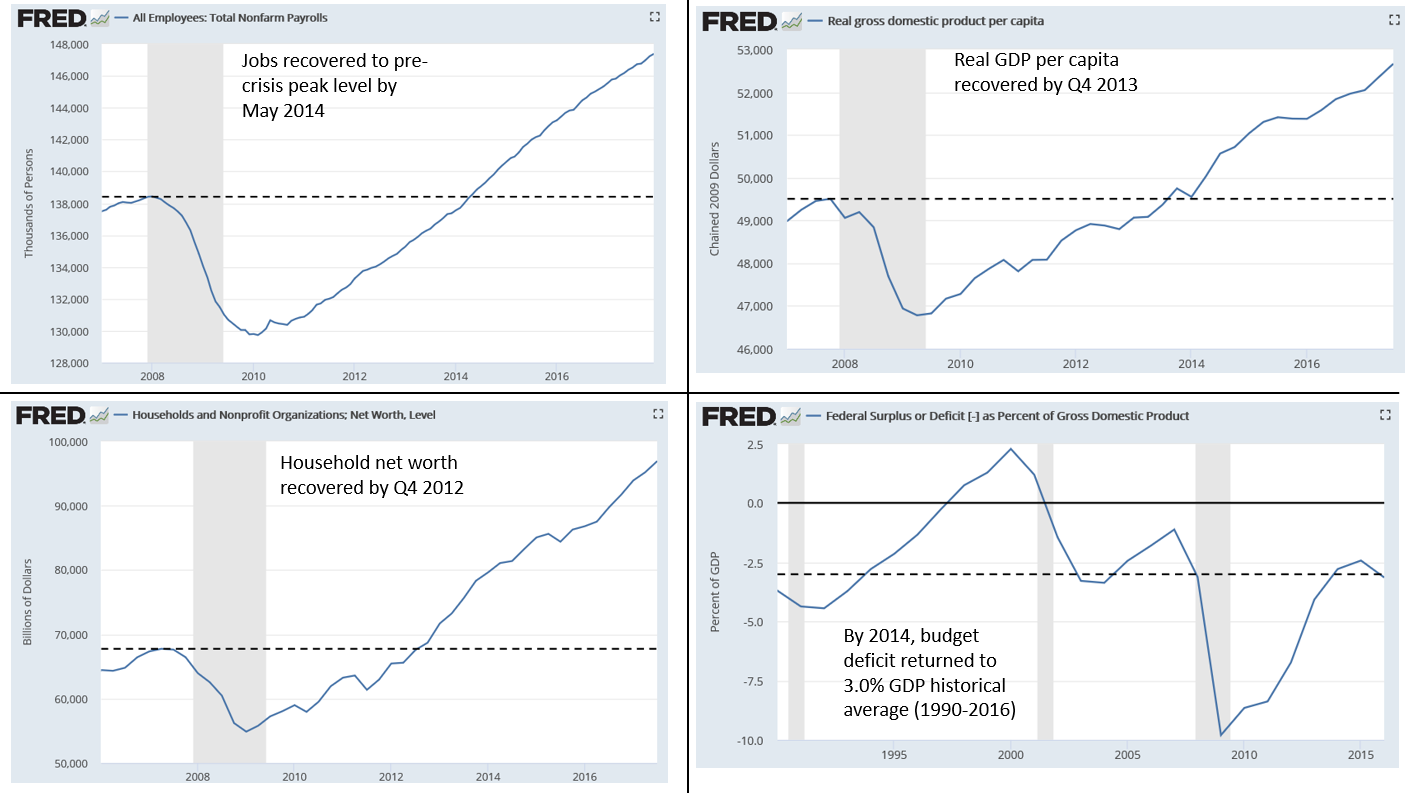
Several major U.S. economic variables had recovered from the 2007-2009 Subprime mortgage crisis and Great Recession by the 2013-2014 time period.

The recession officially ended in the second quarter of 2009, but the nation's economy continued to be described as in an "economic malaise" during the second quarter of 2011. Some economists described the post-recession years as the weakest recovery since the Great Depression and World War II. The weak recovery led one commentator to call it a "Zombie Economy", so-called because it was neither dead nor alive. Household incomes, as of August 2012 continued falling after the end of the recession, eventually declining 7.2% below the December 2007 level. Additionally as of September 2012, the long-term unemployment is the highest it had been since World War II, and the unemployment rate peaked several months after the end of the recession (10.1% in October 2009) and was above 8% until September 2012 (7.8%). The Federal Reserve kept interest rates at a historically low 0.25% from December 2008 until December 2015, when it began to raise them again.

However, the Great Recession was different in kind from all the recessions since the Great Depression, as it also involved a banking crisis and the de-leveraging (debt reduction) of highly indebted households. Research indicates recovery from financial crises can be protracted, with lengthy periods of high unemployment and substandard economic growth. Economist Carmen Reinhart stated in August 2011: "Debt de-leveraging [reduction] takes about seven years ... And in the decade following severe financial crises, you tend to grow by 1 to 1.5 percentage points less than in the decade before, because the decade before was fueled by a boom in private borrowing, and not all of that growth was real. The unemployment figures in advanced economies after falls are also very dark. Unemployment remains anchored about five percentage points above what it was in the decade before."

Then-Fed Chair Ben Bernanke explained during November 2012 several of the economic headwinds that slowed the recovery:

- The housing sector did not rebound, as was the case in prior recession recoveries, as the sector was severely damaged during the crisis. Millions of foreclosures had created a large surplus of properties and consumers were paying down their debts rather than purchasing homes.
- Credit for borrowing and spending by individuals (or investing by corporations) was not readily available as banks paid down their debts.
- Restrained government spending following initial stimulus efforts (i.e., austerity) was not sufficient to offset private sector weaknesses.

For example, U.S. federal spending rose from 19.1% GDP in fiscal year (FY) 2007 to 24.4% GDP in FY2009 (the last year budgeted by President Bush) before falling towards to 20.4% GDP in 2014, closer to the historical average. In dollar terms, federal spending was actually higher in 2009 than in 2014, despite a historical trend of a roughly 5% annual increase. This reduced real GDP growth by approximately 0.5% per quarter on average between Q3 2010 and Q2 2014. Both households and government practicing austerity at the same time was a recipe for a slow recovery.

Several key economic variables (e.g., Job level, real GDP per capita, stock market, and household net worth) hit their low point (trough) in 2009 or 2010, after which they began to turn upward, recovering to pre-recession (2007) levels between late 2012 and May 2014 (close to Reinhart's prediction), which marked the recovery of all jobs lost during the recession. Real median household income fell to a trough of $53,331 in 2012, but recovered to an all-time high of $59,039 by 2016. However, the gains during the recovery were very unevenly distributed. Economist Emmanuel Saez wrote in June 2016 that the top 1% of families captured 52% of the total real income (GDP) growth per family from 2009-2015. The gains were more evenly distributed after the tax increases in 2013 on higher-income earners. According to the Federal Reserve, median family net worth had peaked at about $140,000 in 2007, fell to a low point of $84,000 in 2013, and only partially recovered to $97,000 by 2016. Middle-class families had much of their wealth in housing, driving much of the decline when the housing bubble burst.

Healthcare costs in the United States slowed in the period after the Great Recession (2008–2012). A decrease in inflation and in the number of hospital stays per population drove a reduction in the rate of growth in aggregate hospital costs at this time. Growth slowed most for surgical stays and least for maternal and neonatal stays.

President Obama declared the bailout measures started under the Bush administration and continued during his administration as completed and mostly profitable as of December 2014. As of January 2018, bailout funds had been fully recovered by the government, when interest on loans is taken into consideration. A total of $626B was invested, loaned, or granted due to various bailout measures, while $390B had been returned to the Treasury. The Treasury had earned another $323B in interest on bailout loans, resulting in an $87B profit.

== Severity ==
The vast majority of economic historians believe the Great Recession was the second worst contraction in US history, after the Great Depression. Some economists, including Ben Bernanke, have argued that the 2008 financial crisis was arguably more severe than the financial crisis that preceded the Great Depression, and that a depression was only avoided due to decisive policy actions taken by the Federal Reserve and federal government.

== See also ==
- Timeline of the Great Recession
- Causes of the Great Recession
- New Deal
- 1991 Indian economic crisis
- Stock market crashes in India
- 2008 financial crisis
- 2008–2011 bank failures in the United States
- 2008–2009 Keynesian resurgence
- 2010 United States foreclosure crisis
- 2011 United States debt-ceiling crisis
- List of economic crises
- The Big Short
- List of stock market crashes and bear markets
