= Bloody Assize of 1814 =

Treason trials held in 1814

The Bloody Assize in Upper Canada was a series of trials held at Ancaster during the War of 1812. The trials resulted in treason convictions and subsequent execution of Upper Canada residents who were found to have violently aided the enemy.

During the war, a number of settlers from the Niagara and London Districts took up arms against their neighbours in aid of American raiders. Many were American-born and later fled to the United States.

In 1813, several groups were taken prisoner. In 1814, nineteen people were charged with high treason and charges were also filed against a number of persons then living outside Canada. In May of that year, a special court was established at Ancaster and a series of trials were held in June. The judges presiding over these trials were Chief Justice Thomas Scott, Justice William Dummer Powell, and Justice William Campbell. The prosecutor was the attorney general for the province, John Beverley Robinson.

Fifteen men were convicted and sentenced to death. Eight were hanged at the Burlington Heights British military camp on July 20, 1814 and their heads chopped off and displayed on poles. Their heads were later paraded across the local villages. The bodies were buried in an unmarked grave close to the gallows. Seven others were banished. Of those, three died of typhus while still in captivity and one escaped and was not recaptured.

The eight executed were Aaron Stevens, Adam Crysler, Dayton Lindsey, Noah Payne Hopkins, George Peacock, Jr., Isaiah Brink, Benjamin Simmons and John Dunham. The majority of the men had been captured at the Battle of Nanticoke Creek. Their possessions were confiscated. Others convicted included Jacob Overholser, Garrett Neil and Isaac Petit, who died of typhus.
