= Stelco Lake Erie Works =

Steel mill in Ontario, Canada

- Lake Erie Works
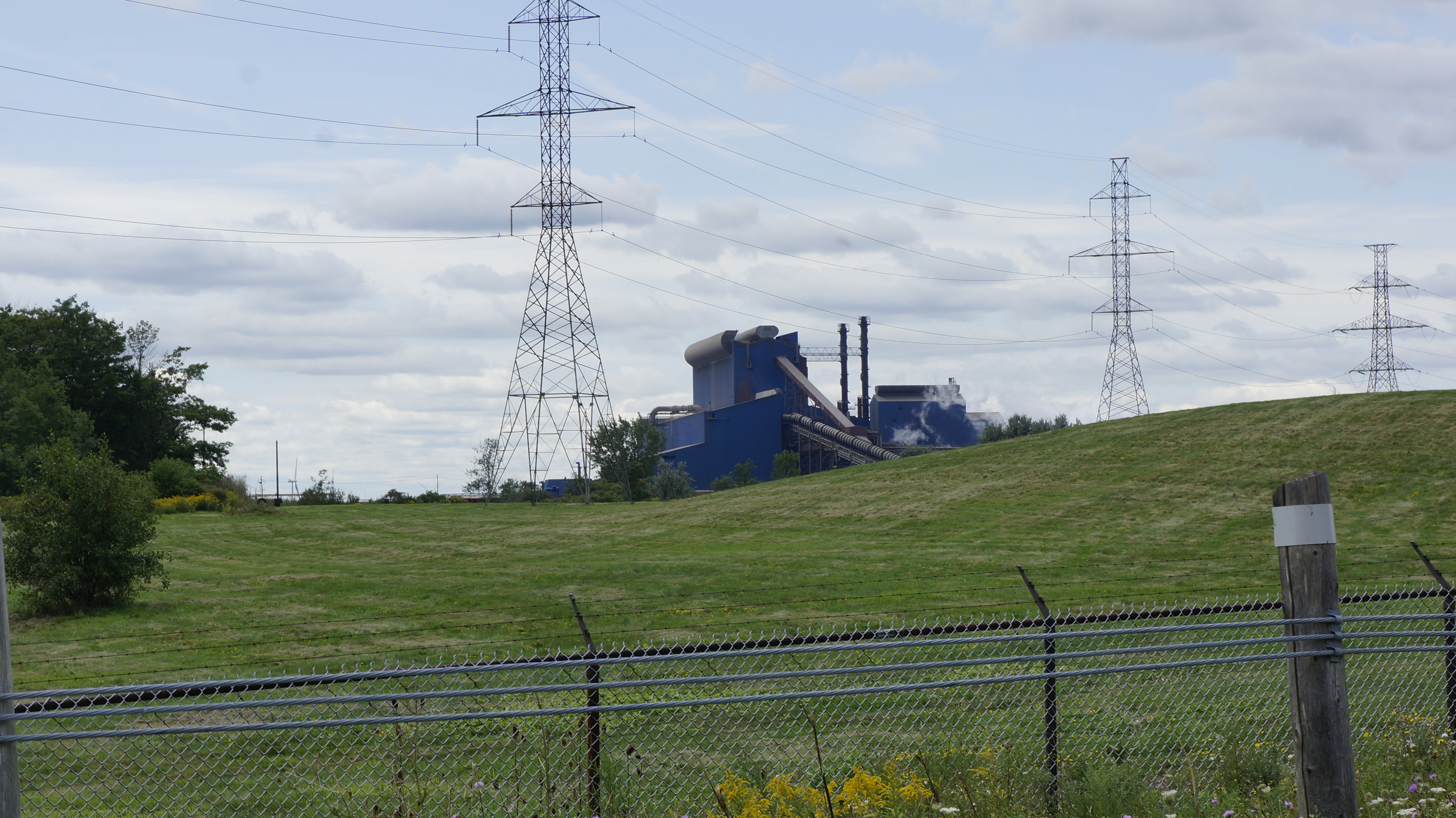
- Stelco Lake Erie Works; image current as of September 3, 2021

Greenfield steel mill
- Location: 2330 Haldimand 3 Nanticoke, Ontario; N0A 1L0
- Serving canal: Welland Canal
- Serving railway: Southern Ontario Railway
- Further ownership: Stelco (1980); U.S. Steel Canada (2007)
- Coordinates: 42.821180°N 80.089445°W

Construction
- Completed: June 1, 1980
- Employees: 1250
- Main contractor: Peter Gordon

References

Stelco Lake Erie Works is a greenfield steel mill located in Nanticoke, Ontario, Canada.

All the employees who work for this operation are unionized by United Steelworkers Local 8782; which is a local that is exclusive to the employees of the former Stelco Lake Erie Works. The site has been a source of jobs for many people in both Haldimand County and Norfolk County for more than 30 years. Ever since the first elements of steel were manufactured during the summer of 1980, this steel mill has produced materials for major industrial workplaces like General Motors and the other major North American manufacturing companies.

The plant was shut down in March 2009, as the Great Recession entered its third year; automobile and other manufacturing was in severe decline in North America, as seen in U.S. raw steel production falling from 2 million to 0.9 million tonnes, −55% year-over-year for the third week of February. The plant was not reopened until near the end of April 2010. Another lockout occurred in late April 2013 after the company had made a final offer to settle on 15 April. This shutdown finally ended on 1 September 2013 with the steelworkers union approving a contract with an end-date in 2018.

== Summary ==
In 2017 Bedrock Industries purchased Stelco renaming it to its original name after bringing it out of CCAA insolvency status. U.S. Steel Canada purchased Stelco in 2007 for US$1.1 billion (equivalent to $1.4 billion in 2024). The merger between the final independent Canadian company and the American steel conglomerate was finalized on August 27 of that year. This operation has a focus on making steel for the automotive sector. As North America's newest greenfield steel mill it is one of the most efficient mills in North America.

Stelco Lake Erie Works was powered by the Nanticoke Generating Station, but since that plant's closure in 2015 and subsequent demolition the plant has been powered by the hydroelectric grid centred around Niagara Falls at the Sir Adam Beck Hydroelectric Power Stations. In 2020 Stelco announced a partnership with DTE Energy to build a 65MW cogeneration plant on its site, using waste heat from its facility to further meet its energy demands.

== Lockouts ==
=== 2009-10 lockout ===
The drastic move to move all U.S. Steel operations back to the United States ended up costing about 1500 Canadian jobs. Both the Nanticoke Lake Erie Works and its sister Hamilton Works were shut down in 2009 due to lock-out; leaving many people in the area with little or no disposable income to spend on consumer goods and items. A tentative agreement at Lake Erie Works was made on April 8, 2010, after an eight-month lockout and a vote ratification was made on April 15, 2010, at 11:15 P.M.

Lake Erie Works finally re-opened after the eight-month lockout on April 23, 2010, re-employing about 1100 people. Approximately 400 people never got their jobs back at Stelco Lake Erie Works simply because they were either too old, moved on to other careers, turned to welfare, or went back to college. Most other local jobs lost during the global recession of the period were eventually restored; resulting in a major drop in the local unemployment rate for the summer of 2010.

=== 2013 lockout ===
Negotiations to extend the union contract for workers of Stelco Lake Erie Works failed on April 25, 2013. As a result, the company made their official decision to lock out all workers starting on the morning of April 28, 2013. Unlike the previous lockout, failure to accept changes in wage structure was the primary reason for causing the lockout rather than the unhealthy global economy. Stelco Lake Erie Works was very profitable prior to the lockout and was far from being the "bankrupt" company that U.S. Steel wanted to portray the company as to members of the mainstream media.

Reduced vacation time, consolidated pay schedules and the eradication of pay raises consistent with inflation are the secondary reasons behind the lockout. One thousand people are affected by this lockout and are free to seek Employment Insurance at home through the Internet. The parent company (U.S. Steel) offered some information about "getting tough on Canadian labor during a soft economic climate." Haldimand County has been affected by this turn of events because they failed to diversify their mix of industries. Norfolk County, however, has managed to mitigate some of the employment issues by becoming increasingly reliant on the economy of the Greater Toronto Area instead of the industrial muscle of the Hamilton area. Employers from that region have started to use innovative business venture plans from the globalized economy to bring 2600 residents back into the labor force. Even as the lockout reaches the status of a "provincial labor dispute," certain members of the Canadian Parliament have indicated that the motives of U.S. Steel directly violate the Investment Canada Act; which prevents foreign companies from investing beyond a certain size if they do not present a "net benefit to Canada." As of 2010, Canadian policy is to consider over a foreign investment of more than $299 million to be a "significant" amount for the Canadian economy.

Threatening the cost of living allowance with the changing of the base year from 1971 to 2002 was also one of the main reasons that the Stelco Lake Erie Works employees went on lockout. Earning a $45,000 per year paycheck on the 1971 base year for the company's "cost of living allowance" (which would be $353,540.67 in today's money) is more substantial than a yearly paycheck using the 2002 base year for the same plan. The adjusted paycheck with inflation for the 2002 base COLA year would be $73,890 for an entire year of labor. Since the 1970s was a rather inflationary era and the 2000s were an era of light inflation, it helps to consider that the cost of gas rose faster from 1971 to 1980 than it did from 2001 to 2010.

On September 1, 2013, 71% of voting union members acceded to the company's way of thinking and signed a five-year contract that would guarantee work until September 1, 2018. While basic salaries have remained the same, there has been a cut in vacation premiums that allowed them to get paid while on vacation.
