= 1946 Stelco strike =

The 1946 Stelco strike was a strike by Stelco steelworkers in Hamilton, Ontario in July 1946.

== Strike ==
On 14 July, the workers met at the Playhouse Theatre on Sherman Avenue and voted in favour of strike action. Their demands included a 40-hour week, increased salaries, and recognition of Local 1005. On 15 July, the workers walked off the job and the strike began. As workers from other unions in the city joined, the strike would reach 20% of Hamilton's industrial workforce at its height, and received support from Hamilton mayor Samuel Lawrence.

During the strike, Bill Scandlan, a nail maker who had begun working at the factory just before the start of World War II, was named as the entertainment coordinator for the workers, including arranging baseball games and appearances by Woody Guthrie and Pete Seeger. Frank Tunney would organise a wrestling competition in support of the strike.

The strike saw some violence, with Stelco hiring several hundred strikebreakers to attack the picket lines on the second day of the strike. Nora Frances Henderson, the first woman to be elected to the Hamilton city council, opposed the strike.

On 4 October 1946, the strike ended as workers voted 2173 to 112 to accept an agreement.

== Aftermath ==
Samuel Lawrence would win the 1946 Hamilton, Ontario, municipal election, held in December. Bill Scandlan, the strike's entertainment coordinator, would go on to run for the federal parliament with the Co-operative Commonwealth Federation in the Hamilton West riding in the 1957 and 1958 elections, later becoming Ontario NDP vice-president in the 1960s.

In April 1947, the city would demolish Woodlands Park, a city park that served as a frequent gathering spot for the striking workers.

== Legacy ==
Rob Kristofferson of Wilfrid Laurier University has called the strike "a huge event in the city's history," saying that it "resembled a general strike." In 2017, the CBC described it as "one of the most significant strikes and labour force conflicts in national history."

== See also ==
- Economic history of Hamilton, Ontario
