= John Bostwick =

Canadian politician

John Bostwick (February 24, 1780 – September 9, 1849) was a surveyor, businessman and political figure in Upper Canada.

He was born in Great Barrington, Massachusetts in 1780 to Gideon Bostwick. His father had obtained land in Oxford County, Ontario, but died before being able to move his family. Botswick did not obtain the land in Oxford Township but rather settled on land further south in the Long Point area in 1797. He apprenticed himself to surveyor William Hambly. In 1805, he became sheriff for the London District. He served as a captain in the 1st Norfolk Militia and commanded the 1st Flank Company during the War of 1812 including at the Battle of Nanticoke Creek. In 1817, his family became the first settlers in the Kettle Creek area. He officially qualified as a surveyor in 1819. In 1820, he was elected to the Legislative Assembly of Upper Canada for Middlesex. He built a small warehouse and established himself as a merchant at Kettle Creek harbour, later Port Stanley. In 1829, he was named justice of the peace in the London District. In 1834, he was named customs collector at Port Stanley and continued to serve in that post until 1844. He died at Port Stanley in 1849.
