= Stelco =

Canadian steel company

Stelco Holdings Inc.
- Formerly: Steel Company of Canada (1910–1980); Stelco Inc. (1980–2007); Hamilton Works – US Steel Canada (2007–2016)
- Type: Subsidiary
- Traded as: TSX: STLC (2016–2024); TSX: STE (until 2007)
- Industry: Steel milling
- Founded: 8 June 1910
- Founder: Charles S. Wilcox
- Headquarters: Hamilton, Ontario
- Area served: Worldwide
- Products: Hot-rolled steel cold-rolled steel galvanized steel sheet special bar quality green steel ore mining
- Owner: Cleveland-Cliffs
- Number of employees: 2,000
- Website: https://www.stelco.com/

Stelco Holdings Inc. (known as U.S. Steel Canada from 2007 to 2016) is an American steel company based in Hamilton, Ontario. Stelco was founded in 1910 by the amalgamation of several smaller firms. It continued on for almost 100 years until it filed for bankruptcy in 2007 and was bought by U.S. Steel. In 2016, the company was sold to Bedrock Industries of the United States, which took the company public via a second IPO. The company made its debut on the Toronto Stock Exchange on November 3, 2017. In 2024, American steel manufacturer Cleveland-Cliffs acquired Stelco for approximately US$2.5 billion.

The Hamilton plant has not produced steel since 2011, but its coke ovens and cold rolling finishing works remain in operation. The company employs about 750 people in the Hamilton plant and 1,400 in Nanticoke, Ontario at its greenfield facility Stelco Lake Erie Works.

== History ==
The Steel Company of Canada was established in 1910. It was founded after the merging of the Hamilton Steel and Iron Company (1900) with the Canada Screw Company (1866), Montreal Rolling Mills (1868), the Dominion Wire Manufacturing Company (1883) and the Canada Bolt and Nut Company. Charles S. Wilcox, president of the Hamilton Steel and Iron Company at the time of the consolidation, was appointed the first president of Stelco. He held the position until 1916, continuing on with the company as chairman of the board until his death in 1938.

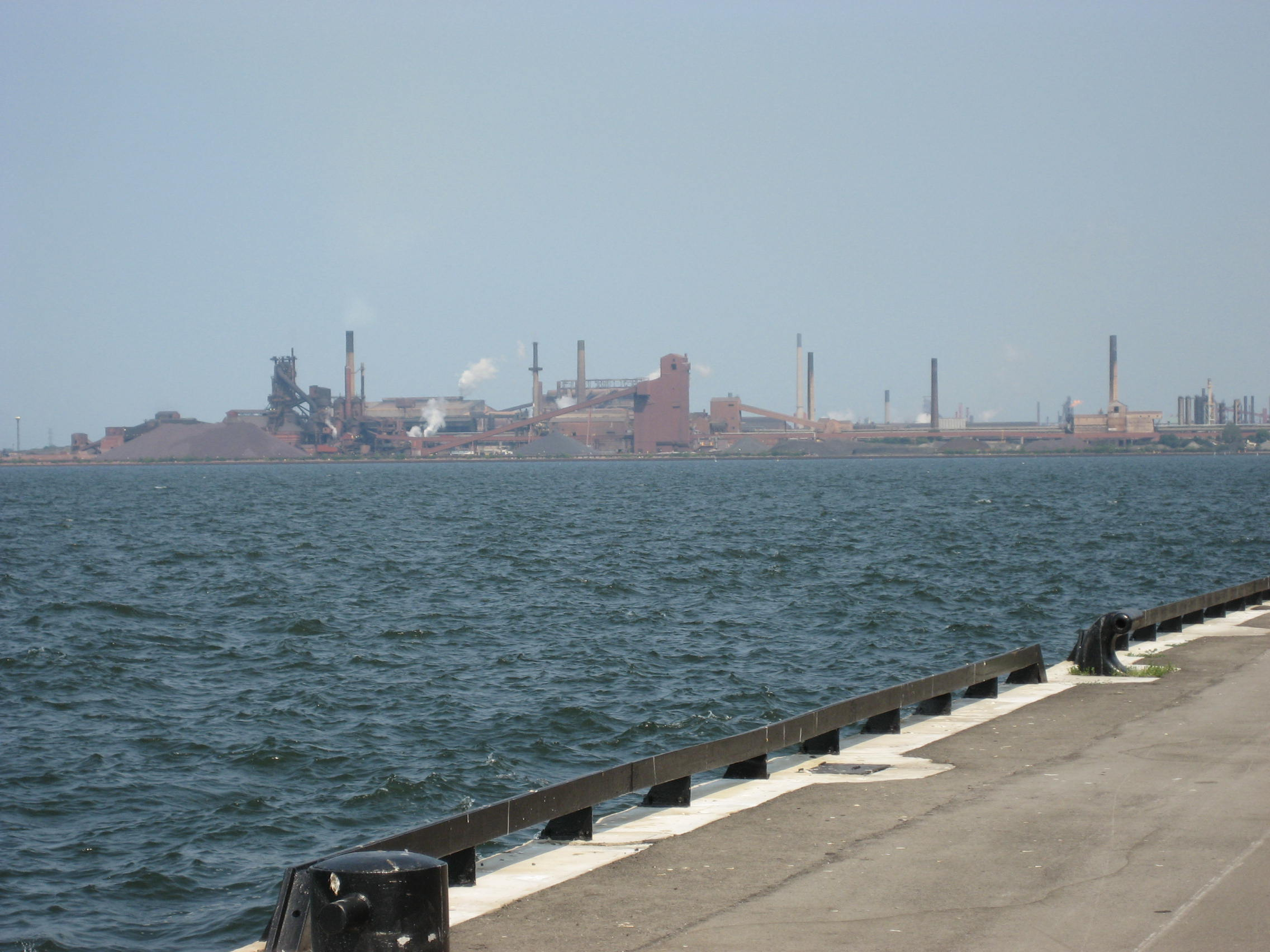
Hamilton Waterfront Trail, Stelco in background

Several union drives at the plant were unsuccessful until the founding strike of Local 1005 of the United Steelworkers of America in 1946.

In 2004, Stelco had financial difficulties and went under court-ordered protection from its creditors, including the Deutsche Bank. Stelco exited Companies' Creditors Arrangement Act (CCAA) bankruptcy protection on March 31, 2006. Several non-core operations were divested, including Stelwire, Norambar (formerly Stelco McMaster Works) and Welland Pipe. The CCAA exit has seen the remaining operations restructured into nine separate operating businesses held by the corporate entity of Stelco.

On August 27, 2007, U.S. Steel purchased Stelco for $1.9 billion – $1.1 billion in cash and assuming $800 million in debt. The company was renamed Hamilton Works – US Steel Canada. The deal closed on October 31, 2007. The company was renamed U.S. Steel Canada Inc., and its shares were delisted from the Toronto Stock Exchange.

In an effort to streamline operations, U.S. Steel announced on March 3, 2009, that it would be temporarily shutting down its Hamilton plant and most of its Lake Erie plant, putting more than 2,000 people out of work. This announcement came four months after U.S. Steel laid off 700 employees at the Hamilton plant when it shut down its blast furnace.

Market conditions and declining customer orders prompted U.S. Steel to shut down the Hamilton Works on October 1, 2010. 100 jobs were restored when the German Max Aicher steel company bought two steel mills from U.S. Steel and opened them as "Max Aicher North America." More jobs are expected to be created when the mills are in full production. The Hamilton steel-making and iron-making operations were permanently closed on December 31, 2013.

On September 16, 2014, U.S. Steel Canada announced that it would apply for court protection from its creditors. US Steel then stated that it intended to sell all of its remaining operations in Hamilton in the next two months.

U.S. Steel Canada was severed from U.S. Steel Corporation in 2015 after it entered CCAA protection in 2014. In November 2016, a deal was struck to sell U.S. Steel Canada to Bedrock Industries.

On December 2, 2016, the company took the "Stelco" name again. In 2017, an initial public offering raised CA$200 million for the company.

Portions of the Stelco's archives are held at Library and Archives Canada, Brock University, and the Canadian Centre for Architecture. In January 2021 Stelco added pig iron production capability to its Lake Erie blast furnace.

Stelco purchased a 40% stake in the Hamilton Tiger-Cats professional football team in January 2022.

In July 2024, it was publicly announced that Cleveland-Cliffs, an American steel manufacturer, was acquiring Stelco for approximately US$2.5 billion. The purchase was completed four months later.

== Environmental impact ==
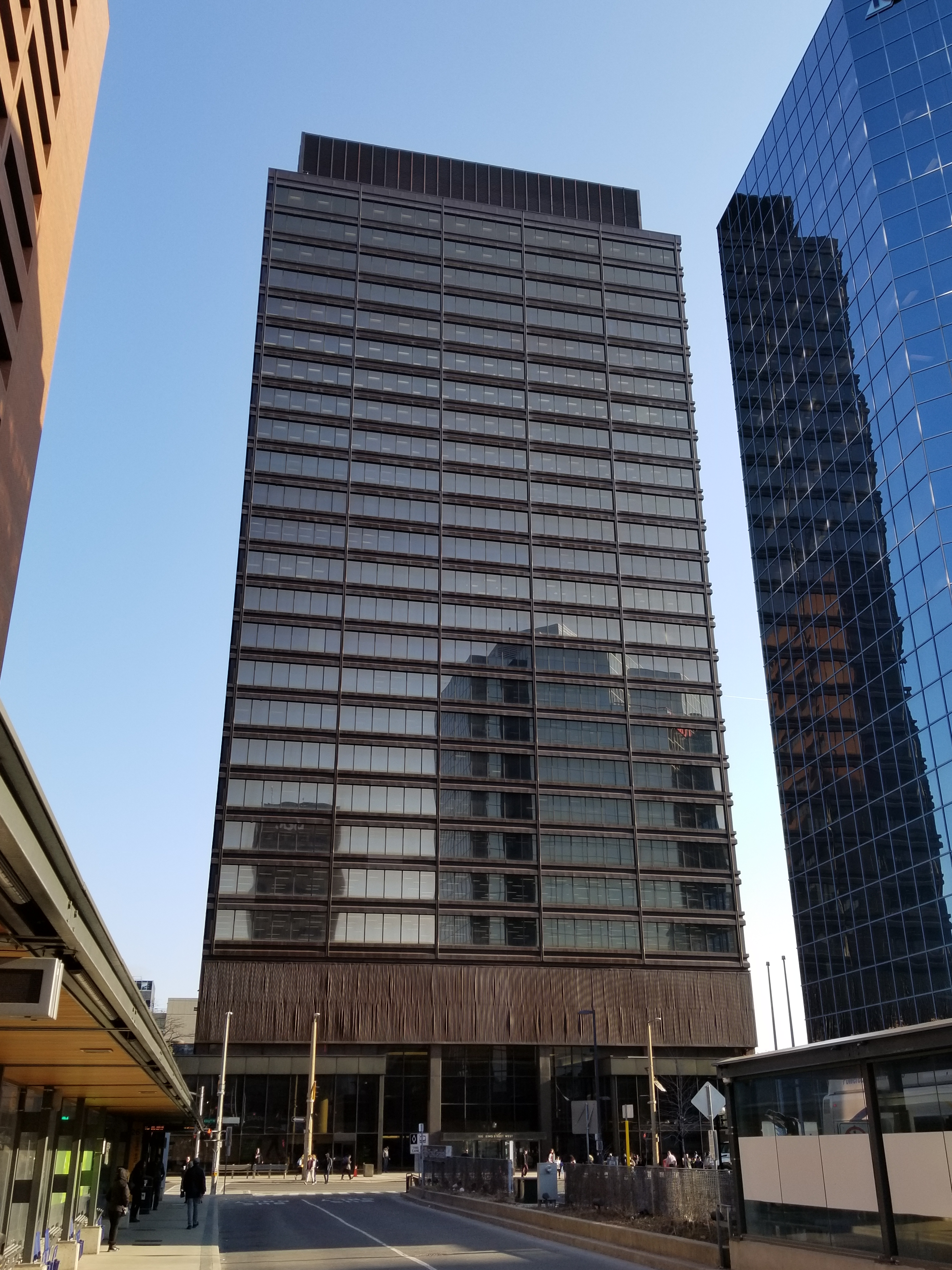
Stelco Tower was formerly the location of Stelco's headquarters

Steelmaking in Canada has long been associated with pollution. For example, in 1989, Stelco and Dofasco were listed among the "dirty dozen" polluters in Ontario:

"For many years Steeltown's two giants pumped liquid discharges that contained cyanide, phosphorus, ammonia, solvents and phenols straight into Hamilton Harbour. Stelco, in particular, was still pumping more phenols and cyanide into the harbour than it was supposed to in early 1987. But both firms have been cleaning up to meet the terms of a pollution control order imposed on them by Queen's Park [and] the harbour is getting cleaner and supports 58 known species of fish."

Since Stelco ceased steelmaking in 2011, it received less media attention regarding pollution.

== Operations ==
The company operates the main Hilton Works in Hamilton, named after the late company president Hugh Hilton, and the Lake Erie Works in Nanticoke on Lake Erie. Until the 2006 restructuring, Stelco's operations also included Stelco McMaster Works in Contrecœur, Quebec and Stelwire (both acquired by ArcelorMittal in 2006 and now operates as ArcelorMittal Long Products Canada – Hamilton-East Complex and Mittal Canada Contrecoeur-Ouest Inc.). The Nanticoke plant was notable because it is of a relatively newer design, and uses far less water.

Stelco Tower, now known as 100 King Street West and associated with Lloyd D. Jackson Square, is an office building in downtown Hamilton where the company's headquarters had been located since the 1970s, but has been completely vacated by Stelco. Stelco's current head office is co-located with their Hamilton Works location at 386 Wilcox Street in Hamilton.

== Governance ==
Presidents of the company are:

- Charles Seward Wilcox, 1910–1916
- Robert Hobson, 1916–1926
- Ross H. McMaster, 1926–1945
- Hugh G. Hilton, 1945–1957
- Vincent William Thomas Scully, 1957–1967
- Harold Melvin Griffith, 1967–1971
- J. Peter Gordon, 1971–1976
- John D. Allan, 1976–1987
- Robert Edmond Heneault, 1987–1991 (Stelco Enterprises)
- Frederick Harold Telmer, 1987–1991 (Stelco Steel)
- Robert J. Milbourne, 1991–2003
- James C. Alfano, 1996–2003
- Frederick Harold Telmer, 2003 (interim)
- Courtney Pratt, 2004–2006
- Rodney B. Mott, 2006–2007
- Douglas R. Matthews, 2007–2009
- David J. Rintoul, 2009–2010
- Anton Jura, 2010–2014
- Michael A. McQuade, 2014–2018
- Alan Kestenbaum, 2019–2024
