= Macroeconomic data in the eurozone countries =

The key macroeconomic data in the eurozone countries are:

- General government net debt / Percent of GDP;
- General government net lending/borrowing / Percent of GDP;
- inflation rate;
- gross domestic product (real GDP);
- unemployment.

== Chronology ==
=== Year 1998 ===
Stato	Debt/% of GDP	Deficit/GDP	Inflation/PIL	GDP (real)	Unemployment
Austria	64,77	-2,48	0,82	3,60	4,48
Belgium	117,06	-0,88	0,92	1,92	9,30
Finland	48,57	+1,51	1,35	5,02	11,36
France	59,43	-2,61	0,67	3,55	11,07
Germany	60,32	-2,18	0,60	2,03	9,05
Greece	96,58	-3,91	4,52	3,64	11,20
Ireland	53,62	+2,27	2,13	8,44	7,59
Italy	114,94	-3,10	1,98	1,40	11,33
Luxembourg	7,10	+3,37	1,00	6,49	3,06
Netherlands	65,70	-0,87	1,78	3,92	3,83
Portugal	50,40	-1,77	2,21	5,05	5,03
Spain	64,13	-3,22	1,76	4,47	18,61
UE-12	72,91	-2,17	1,21	2,83	10,10

=== Year 1999 ===
Stato	Debt/% of GDP	Deficit/GDP	Inflation/PIL	GDP (real)	Unemployment
Austria	64,20	-2,39	0,52	3,34	3,93
Belgium	113,52	-0,59	1,13	3,53	8,50
Finland	46,58	+1,58	1,31	3,90	10,20
France	58,51	-1,78	0,56	3,19	10,46
Germany	60,90	-1,65	0,64	2,02	8,27
Greece	102,51	-3,14	2,15	3,42	12,13
Ireland	48,52	+2,39	2,47	10,89	5,56
Italy	113,75	-1,78	1,66	1,46	10,94
Luxembourg	6,43	+3,40	1,03	8,42	2,89
Netherlands	61,10	+0,41	2,03	4,68	3,23
Portugal	49,55	-0,88	2,17	4,08	4,46
Spain	62,34	-1,43	2,24	4,75	15,64
UE-12	71,81	-1,30	1,17	2,92	9,30

=== Year 2000 ===
Stato	Debt/% of GDP	Deficit/GDP	Inflation/PIL	GDP (real)	Unemployment
Austria	66,52	-1,86	1,96	3,65	3,60
Belgium	107,52	-0,04	2,68	3,80	6,90
Finland	43,82	+6,85	2,95	5,34	9,81
France	57,33	-1,47	1,83	4,08	9,08
Germany	59,74	+1,31	1,40	3,21	7,53
Greece	103,44	-3,70	2,90	4,48	11,35
Ireland	37,76	+4,78	5,25	9,67	4,26
Italy	109,18	-0,86	2,58	3,69	10,10
Luxembourg	6,17	+5,97	3,15	8,44	2,50
Netherlands	53,80	+1,97	2,34	3,94	2,83
Portugal	48,48	-1,09	2,80	3,93	3,98
Spain	59,26	-1,00	3,48	5,05	13,87
UE-12	69,21	+0,09	2,19	3,87	8,50

=== Year 2001 ===
Stato	Debt/% of GDP	Deficit/GDP	Inflation/PIL	GDP (real)	Unemployment
Austria	67,11	-0,15	2,30	0,52	3,60
Belgium	106,55	+0,41	2,44	0,71	6,60
Finland	42,47	+4,97	2,66	2,29	9,14
France	56,88	-1,56	1,78	1,77	8,39
Germany	58,83	-2,28	1,90	1,24	7,62
Greece	103,72	-4,36	3,66	4,20	10,75
Ireland	35,49	+0,93	3,99	5,70	3,87
Italy	108,78	-3,10	2,32	1,82	9,10
Luxembourg	6,31	+6,11	2,66	2,52	2,30
Netherlands	50,70	-0,26	5,11	1,93	2,42
Portugal	51,20	-2,37	4,41	1,97	4,07
Spain	55,50	-0,67	2,83	3,65	10,55
UE-12	68,21	-1,81	2,42	1,88	8,00

=== Year 2002 ===
Stato	Debt/% of GDP	Deficit/GDP	Inflation/PIL	GDP (real)	Unemployment
Austria	66,45	-0,87	1,70	1,65	4,20
Belgium	100,97	-0,09	1,55	1,36	7,50
Finland	41,50	+4,00	2,00	1,82	9,12
France	58,82	-3,17	1,94	1,06	8,91
Germany	60,44	-3,66	1,36	-0,00	8,36
Greece	101,66	-4,37	3,91	3,44	10,33
Ireland	32,13	-0,31	4,73	6,55	4,40
Italy	105,66	-3,01	2,61	0,45	8,61
Luxembourg	6,32	+2,10	2,08	4,11	2,60
Netherlands	50,50	-2,11	3,83	0,08	2,76
Portugal	53,84	-0,95	3,68	0,71	5,09
Spain	52,55	-0,48	3,59	2,70	11,48
UE-12	67,92	-2,52	2,26	0,94	8,40

=== Year 2003 ===
Stato	Debt/% of GDP	Deficit/GDP	Inflation/PIL	GDP (real)	Unemployment
Austria	65,52	-1,57	1,30	0,80	4,30
Belgium	99,15	-0,11	1,51	0,78	8,20
Finland	44,55	+2,33	1,30	2,00	9,04
France	62,92	-4,12	2,17	1,08	8,97
Germany	63,94	-4,03	1,03	-0,22	9,31
Greece	97,45	-5,60	3,43	5,94	9,73
Ireland	30,94	+0,41	4,00	4,41	4,65
Italy	104,35	-3,54	2,81	-0,02	8,45
Luxembourg	6,21	+0,46	2,05	1,55	3,50
Netherlands	52,00	-3,15	2,24	0,34	3,69
Portugal	55,88	+0,04	3,26	-0,93	6,37
Spain	48,74	-0,23	3,10	3,10	11,48
UE-12	69,16	-3,03	2,11	0,81	8,80

=== Year 2004 ===
Stato	Debt/% of GDP	Deficit/GDP	Inflation/PIL	GDP (real)	Unemployment
Austria	64,75	-4,52	1,95	2,55	4,90
Belgium	94,13	-0,29	1,86	3,07	8,40
Finland	44,42	+2,14	0,14	4,11	8,83
France	64,87	-3,63	2,34	2,25	9,23
Germany	65,75	-3,78	1,79	1,21	9,76
Greece	98,57	-7,48	3,02	4,62	10,50
Ireland	29,37	+1,41	2,30	4,60	4,48
Italy	103,81	-3,56	2,27	1,53	8,03
Luxembourg	6,35	-1,10	2,23	4,40	3,90
Netherlands	52,40	-1,77	1,38	2,24	4,58
Portugal	57,65	-0,18	2,51	1,56	6,77
Spain	46,22	+0,36	3,05	3,27	10,97
UE-12	69,53	2,90	2,18	2,17	8,98

=== Year 2005 ===
Stato	Debt/% of GDP	Deficit/GDP	Inflation/PIL	GDP (real)	Unemployment
Austria	63,94	-1,76	2,11	2,46	5,20
Belgium	91,71	-2,72	2,52	2,02	8,50
Finland	41,74	+2,57	0,78	2,92	8,36
France	66,36	-2,96	1,90	1,96	9,27
Germany	67,97	-3,31	1,92	0,75	10,62
Greece	99,99	-5,11	3,48	2,24	9,90
Ireland	27,25	+1,65	2,18	6,02	4,37
Italy	105,83	-4,37	2,21	0,66	7,68
Luxembourg	6,07	+0,00	2,49	5,43	4,30
Netherlands	51,82	-0,28	1,50	2,05	4,70
Portugal	62,75	-2,54	2,13	0,76	7,74
Spain	43,03	-0,96	3,38	3,62	9,16
UE-12	70,11	-2,49	2,19	1,69	8,98

=== Year 2006 ===
Stato	Debt/% of GDP	Deficit/GDP	Inflation/PIL	GDP (real)	Unemployment
Austria	62,07	-1,63	1,69	3,60	4,80
Belgium	87,27	+0,26	2,34	2,69	8,30
Finland	39,66	+3,96	1,28	4,41	7,70
France	63,66	-2,32	1,91	2,42	9,25
Germany	67,56	-1,64	1,78	3,37	9,83
Greece	97,12	-3,10	3,32	4,52	8,89
Ireland	24,84	-2,93	2,70	5,32	4,44
Italy	106,51	-3,38	2,22	2,04	6,80
Luxembourg	6,52	+1,37	2,67	4,47	4,50
Netherlands	47,37	+0,60	1,65	3,39	3,92
Portugal	63,92	-0,36	3,04	1,44	7,79
Spain	39,57	+2,02	3,56	4,02	8,51
UE-12	68,27	-1,28	2,20	3,04	8,37

=== Year 2007 ===
Stato	Debt/% of GDP	Deficit/GDP	Inflation/PIL	GDP (real)	Unemployment
Austria	59,19	-0,55	2,20	3,73	4,40
Belgium	82,82	-0,20	1,82	2,79	7,50
Finland	35,18	+5,20	1,58	5,33	6,84
France	63,78	-2,73	1,61	2,32	8,34
Germany	64,91	+0,20	2,28	2,66	8,37
Greece	95,56	-3,66	2,99	4,47	8,29
Ireland	25,04	+0,05	2,87	5,63	4,56
Italy	103,47	-1,48	2,04	1,48	6,17
Luxembourg	6,68	+3,63	2,31	6,47	4,40
Netherlands	45,47	+0,32	1,58	3,92	3,19
Portugal	62,73	-2,77	2,42	2,39	8,13
Slovenia	23,35	+0,26	3,61	6,80	4,86
Spain	36,12	+1,90	2,84	3,57	8,26
UE-13	65,90	-0,61	2,14	2,86	7,50

=== Year 2008 ===
Stato	Debt/% of GDP	Deficit/GDP	Inflation/PIL	GDP (real)	Unemployment
Austria	62,37	-0,51	3,22	2,18	3,80
Belgium	89,66	-1,18	4,49	0,80	7,00
Cyprus	48,39	+0,91	4,38	3,62	3,60
Finland	34,67	+4,17	3,90	0,92	6,36
France	67,49	-3,34	3,16	0,09	7,83
Germany	66,35	+0,04	2,75	0,99	7,30
Greece	99,19	-7,70	4,24	2,01	7,68
Ireland	44,37	-7,34	3,11	-3,55	6,31
Italy	106,10	-2,68	3,50	-1,32	6,74
Luxembourg	13,68	+2,88	3,40	0,03	4,40
Malta	63,14	-4,44	4,69	2,57	5,95
Netherlands	58,18	+0,36	2,21	1,88	2,75
Portugal	65,35	-2,78	2,65	-0,04	7,74
Slovenia	22,45	-0,28	3,93	3,49	4,39
Spain	39,72	-4,07	4,13	0,86	11,33
UE-15	69,54	-1,94	3,28	0,47	7,56

=== Year 2009 ===
Stato	Debt/% of GDP	Deficit/GDP	Inflation/PIL	GDP (real)	Unemployment
Austria	67,11	-3,48	0,40	-3,89	4,80
Belgium	96,80	-5,92	-0,01	-2,65	7,72
Cyprus	56,22	-6,07	0,17	-1,74	5,30
Finland	43,90	-2,37	1,60	-8,02	8,25
France	78,08	-7,57	0,10	-2,55	9,43
Germany	73,51	-3,15	0,23	-4,72	7,49
Greece	115,16	-13,58	1,35	-1,96	9,38
Ireland	65,53	-14,61	-1,71	-7,58	11,83
Italy	115,77	-5,24	0,76	-5,04	7,81
Luxembourg	16,46	-0,74	0,37	-4,07	5,95
Malta	68,66	-3,80	1,84	-2,13	6,98
Netherlands	61,77	-4,70	0,97	-3,92	3,51
Portugal	76,30	-9,25	-0,90	-2,58	9,63
Slovakia	35,66	-6,80	0,93	-4,66	12,05
Slovenia	29,38	-5,57	0,85	-7,82	6,00
Spain	53,10	-11,16	-0,24	-3,72	18,01
UE-16	78,98	-6,31	0,29	-4,07	9,41

=== Year 2010 ===
Stato	Debt/% of GDP	Deficit/GDP	Inflation/PIL	GDP (real)	Unemployment
Austria	70,01	-4,80	1,50	1,60	4,13
Belgium	100,20	-4,78	1,97	1,63	8,68
Cyprus	60,83	-5,98	2,22	0,42	7,10
Finland	50,00	-3,40	1,40	2,42	8,81
France	84,20	-8,00	1,64	1,57	9,81
Germany	75,34	-4,50	1,32	3,33	7,05
Greece	130,24	-7,88	4,60	-3,98	11,76
Ireland	93,63	-17,67	-1,60	-0,27	13,50
Italy	118,36	-5,11	1,63	1,00	8,70
Luxembourg	20,13	-3,79	2,31	3,04	5,79
Malta	69,96	-3,79	1,88	1,66	6,90
Netherlands	65,97	-6,00	1,29	1,82	4,20
Portugal	83,13	-7,25	0,93	1,12	10,74
Slovakia	41,84	-8,02	0,70	4,10	14,06
Slovenia	34,54	-5,69	1,50	0,85	7,90
Spain	63,45	-9,27	1,50	-0,36	19,90
UE-16	84,08	-6,45	1,56	1,68	10,07

=== Year 2011 ===
Stato	Debt/% of GDP	Deficit/GDP	Inflation/PIL	GDP (real)	Unemployment
Austria	73,35	-4,07	1,74	1,64	4,20
Belgium	103,10	-5,07	1,91	1,71	8,46
Cyprus	64,05	-5,63	2,35	1,83	6,90
Estonia	7,77	-1,70	1,99	3,50	16,38
Finland	52,20	-1,80	1,80	1,96	8,72
France	87,56	-6,02	1,61	1,65	9,79
Germany	76,52	-3,70	1,36	2,02	7,15
Greece	139,35	-7,30	2,20	-2,63	14,62
Ireland	101,68	-11,23	-0,55	2,28	13,00
Italy	119,69	-4,30	1,69	1,00	8,60
Luxembourg	22,92	-3,12	1,87	3,13	5,78
Malta	70,94	-3,55	2,12	1,66	6,90
Netherlands	69,38	-5,09	1,09	1,68	4,41
Portugal	87,09	-5,23	1,23	-0,05	10,85
Slovakia	43,99	-4,73	1,85	4,30	12,69
Slovenia	37,16	-4,28	2,30	2,36	8,10
Spain	70,22	-6,94	1,14	0,73	19,30
UE-17	86,97	-5,10	1,48	1,49	10,04
