= Battle of Nanticoke Creek =

1813 Skirmish of the War of 1812

Coordinates: 42.809°N 80.079°W

- Part of War of 1812
| Date | November 13, 1813 |
| Location | Nanticoke, Ontario, Canada |
| Result | British victory |

Belligerents
| United Kingdom; Upper Canada | United States |

Commanders and leaders
| Lt-Col. Henry Bostwick; Capt. Daniel McCall; Capt. John Bostwick | John Dunham; Dayton Lindsay; George Peacock jr. |

Units involved
| 1st Oxford Militia; 1st Norfolk Militia; 2nd Norfolk Militia | American sympathizers |

Strength
| 40+ | 21 |

Casualties and losses
| 1 killed | 3 killed 2 wounded 18 captured |

The Battle of Nanticoke Creek was a small engagement fought on November 13, 1813, near Nanticoke, Ontario, Canada, during the War of 1812.

== Background ==
With the American successes at the Battle of Lake Erie and the Battle of the Thames in the autumn of 1813, the majority of the Western and London Districts were under American occupation. British forces had retreated to consolidate their lines of defence around Burlington Heights. The local Canadian militias were left to defend themselves, and militiamen were often persecuted by the occupying Americans.

The lack of proper military governance led to wide-scale raiding and skirmishing along the Niagara frontier in late 1813, and many American sympathizers living in Upper Canada gave aid to these raiders. Loyalist militia despised the sympathizers as much as the American forces, and attempted to attack and hinder their raids when possible.

In early November 1813, emboldened by prospects of a conclusive American victory in the area, American raiders left Buffalo and, led by William Sutherland and Frederick Onstone, invaded the Norfolk/Haldimand region, stealing clothing, horses, and other goods, rounding up cattle and kidnapping militia officers. Captain William Francis of Selkirk, an elderly loyalist who had fought in the American Revolutionary War, was among those captured On November 11, a group of men met at the home of William Drake in Dover. A total of 36 men, including David Long and others from Haldimand, attended the meeting, and after some discussion, several resolutions were passed. The main resolution was to oppose the American marauders and defend Norfolk and the surrounding counties from further raids. The men decided to attack the cabin of John Dunham, an American sympathizer who had lived in Dover but had relocated to Nanticoke Creek.

Although almost all of the men who attended the meeting were members of the Norfolk and Oxford militias, the planned attack was not a sanctioned military action, and there were no official orders to march against the sympathizers.

== Order of battle ==
Canadian forces

- 1st Oxford Militia – Lt-Col. Henry Bostwick (10+)
- 1st Norfolk Militia
  - 1st Flank Company – Capt. John Bostwick, Lt. George Ryerson (10+)
  - 2nd Flank Company – Capt. Daniel McCall, Lt. Samuel Ryerson (10+)
- 2nd Norfolk Militia
  - 2nd Flank Company – Lt. Jonathan Austin (10+)

American forces

- Militia and sympathizers – John Dunham, Dayton Lindsay, George Peacock jr. (21)

== Battle ==
On November 12, a party of Americans was reported near Woodhouse Township. A detachment from the 1st Oxford Militia was sent under the command of Lieutenant Colonel Henry Bostwick to engage them but by the time the militia arrived the Americans had fled down the lake.

Early the following morning, November 13, 1813, a detachment from the 1st Oxford Militia, 1st Norfolk Militia, and 2nd Norfolk Militia, under the command of Lt-Col. Henry Bostwick, marched to the house of John Dunham to carry out the planned attack on the Americans and sympathizers who had gathered there.

The property appeared to be deserted when the militia arrived. Capt. McCall of the 1st Norfolk Militia took a small party through the woods to the other side of the house to prevent the Americans from escaping in that direction while Capt. Bostwick of the took a second small party to block off the escape route to the lake shore. Lt-Col. Bostwick led the rest of the Norfolk and Oxford Militia around to the back of the house to envelope the property completely.

Before all the militia were in place, Captain Bostwick and Lt. Austin entered the front of the house and surprised the Americans who were crowded inside. As the Americans reached for their arms, Bostwick declared that they were surrounded and ordered them to drop their weapons. Most of the men complied but after some consideration, two men fired at Bostwick, wounding him slightly in the face. The two officers were taken prisoner and the Americans ran to guard the windows and doors.

Upon hearing the discharge of muskets, Lt-Col. Bostwick and the Norfolk and Oxford militia charged the house from the rear. A fire-fight began between the militia and the Americans, with some of the Americans managing to flee from the house. They escaped to the woods but Captain McCall's men from the 1st Norfolk Militia "attacked them with spirit". The majority of the Americans who fled were wounded or killed, and seeing their comrades fall, the Americans in and around the house surrendered.

== Aftermath ==
The battle was a success for the Canadian militia, and Lt-Col. Bostwick reported: "Too much praise cannot be given to the militia who composed our party for their steady perseverance, coolness and courage. Most of them had been out the whole of the night before, and notwithstanding the very fatiguing march through the woods and swamps, not a word of complaint was heard."

Robert Nichol praised the action of the militia, claiming that they had saved 7,000 barrels of flour, which otherwise would have been stolen or destroyed by invading Americans.

=== Casualties ===
The Canadian militia lost only one man, Benjamin Chandler of the 1st Oxford Militia, who was shot through the neck. Lt-Col. Bostwick reported: "He was a spirited and brave young man, and his death was much regretted." Three of the Americans were killed and at least two were wounded. Some of the men who eluded capture in the woods may have been wounded as well.

The captured Americans and sympathizers were escorted to the encampment at Burlington Heights and the American's horses and gear were sold for prize money to fund the local militia. Among the captives were Adam Crysler, John Dunham, Dayton Lindsay and George Peacock Jr. George Peacock Sr., for whom Peacock Point was named, may have been among those killed in the skirmish.

=== Bloody Assizes ===
Major-General Francis de Rottenburg, commander of the army in Upper Canada and acting lieutenant-governor of Upper Canada, was appalled by the American raiding in the Niagara region and by December 14 a special commission was created to investigate treasonous activities of the sympathizers in the London and Home Districts. John Beverly Robinson, the Attorney General of Upper Canada, was assigned to determine what charges could be laid against American sympathizers, including those captured at Nanticoke.

The result was the Bloody Assize of 1814, whereby 8 sympathizers were hanged for treason, including four of the men who had been captured at Nanticoke.
