= Nanticoke, Ontario =

Nanticoke
- Unincorporated Community
- Location within Ontario Location within Canada
- Coordinates: 42.809044°N 80.082269°W
- Country: Canada
- Province: Ontario
- County: Haldimand County

Government
  - Mayor of Haldimand: Shelly Ann Bentley
  - Ward 1 (Jarvis & Townsend) Councillor: Stewart Patterson
  - MP: Leslyn Lewis (Conservative)
  - MPP: Bobbi Ann Brady (Independent)

Area (as of 2001)
  - Land: 674.72 km^{2} (260.51 sq mi)

Population (2001)
  - Total: 23,588
  - Density: 35/km^{2} (91/sq mi)
- Time zone: UTC−05:00 (EST)
  - Summer (DST): UTC−04:00 (EDT)

Nanticoke is an unincorporated community and former city located on the western border of Haldimand County, Ontario, Canada. Nanticoke is located directly across Lake Erie from the US city of Erie, Pennsylvania.

== Summary ==
Unlike the majority of Haldimand or Norfolk Counties, Nanticoke is a highly-industrialized community, which is southeast of Simcoe in neighbouring Norfolk County and south of Brantford. Nanticoke's residential area is bordered on the west by the Nanticoke Industrial Park, home to the Stelco Lake Erie Works and a number of smaller businesses, including Charles Jones Industrial, ESM Metallurgical Products, and Air Products. The neighbouring Nanticoke Refinery, to the northeast and the former Nanticoke Generating Station (demolished in 2019), to the southeast, are not part of the Industrial Park land, but they are frequently confused because of their proximity.

One of Nanticoke's nearby natural landmarks is Peacock Point, which is composed of modest working-class houses. One of the closest communities to Nanticoke is Jarvis, which is only 11.4 km (7.1 mi) to the north. There are plenty of streams, valleys, and Lake Erie within a short driving distance of Nanticoke. Selkirk Provincial Park, 11 km (6.8 mi) away, is the closest provincial park to Nanticoke.

Nanticoke is also home to an active port, located at 42.785764°N 80.078015°W.

== History ==
Once considered to be a bustling farming and fishing community, and inhabited since the late 18th century, Nanticoke adapted itself to the Industrial Revolution and became a desired spot for heavy industry to move in through the decades.

The Battle of Nanticoke Creek was fought nearby on November 13, 1813.

In 1974, the towns of Port Dover and Waterford; the village of Jarvis; and parts of the townships of Rainham, Townsend, Walpole and Woodhouse were amalgamated to form the city of Nanticoke. In 2001, Nanticoke was divided between Haldimand and Norfolk Counties.

Wind turbines were implemented in the community in November 2013.

== Demographics ==
As of the 2001 census, Nanticoke was home to 23,588 individuals over an area of 674.72 square kilometres for a population density of 35 people per square kilometre. The median age of the population was 39.9, 39.5 for Men and 40.3 for Women living in 9,748 private dwellings. The median household income in 2000 was $58,102.

Census	Population
1971	19,695
1981	19,816
1991	22,727
1996	23,485
2001	23,588

=== Ethnicity ===
As of the 2001 census, 410 of the 23,425 citizens of Nanticoke identified as a visible minority.

Additionally, 650 people identified as Aboriginal.

=== Religion ===
As of the 2001 census, 18,945 people living in Nanticoke identified as following a Christian religion and 4,080 identified as having no religious affiliation.

== Notable people ==
- Harold Cotton, retired ice hockey player
- Ryan Nie, retired ice hockey player
