= List of tallest structures in Canada =

This is a list of the tallest one hundred structures in Canada, measured from the base to the tallest point. This may refer to the roof top, antenna, spire, mast or as in the case with smokestacks and bridges, the highest structural point.

This list includes buildings, towers, transmission towers, chimneys, bridges, and oil platforms.

There is a separate list for guyed masts since their heights are not fully verifiable and may be inaccurate by several metres. In many cases, measurements are taken to the height of the tallest transmitter rather than the actual highest structural point.

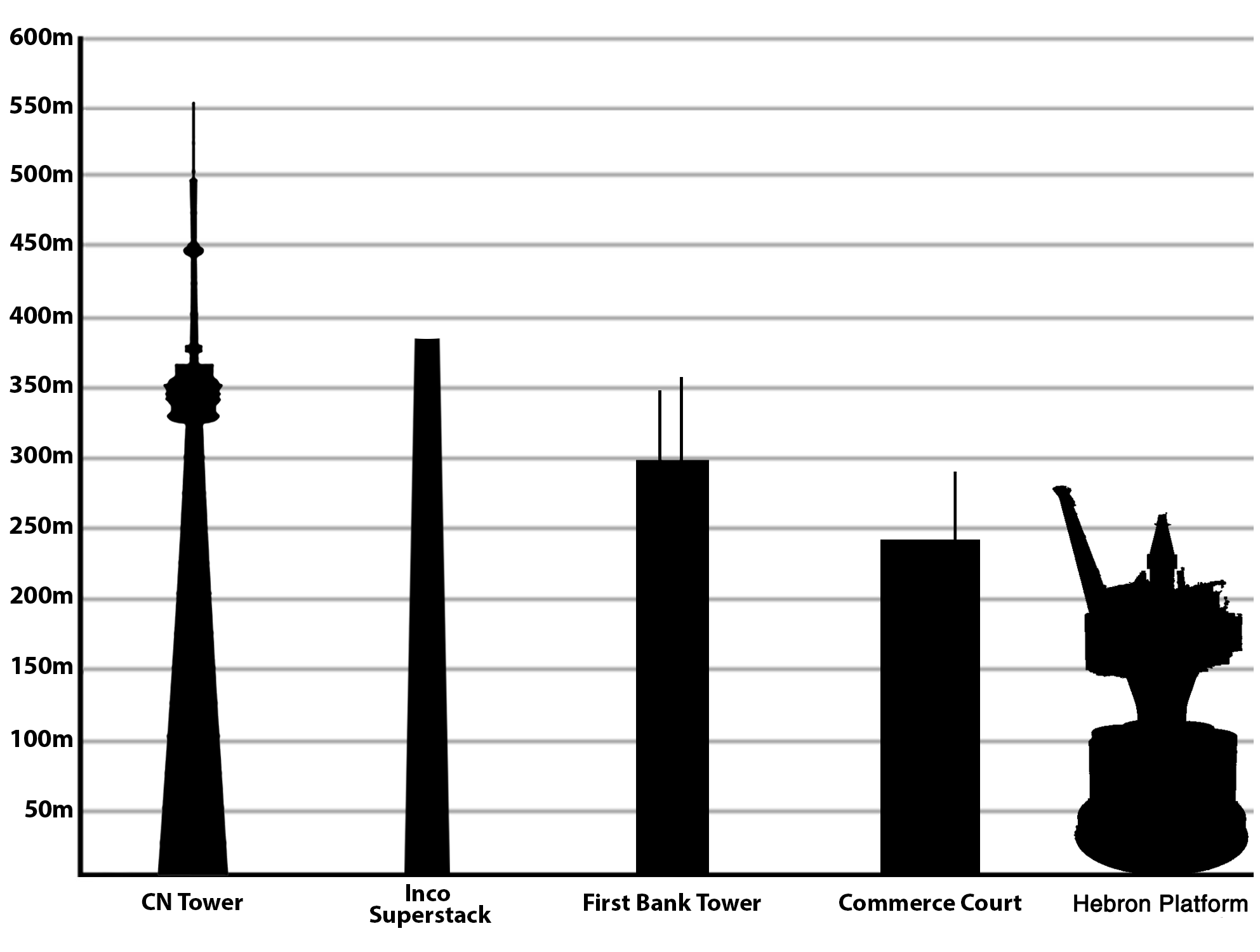
Tallest structures in Canada (not including guyed masts)

The pinnacle and roof height figures are sourced from SkyscraperPage and/or the Council on Tall Buildings and Urban Habitat (CTBUH). In cases of conflicting data, both heights are listed

== Tallest 100 structures in Canada (not including guyed masts) ==
Current as of 2026
Rank	Name	Location	Pinnacle height	Roof height (if applicable)	Floor count	Year completed	Image
1	CN Tower	Toronto, Ontario	553.33 m (1,815.4 ft)	457.2m/1500ft	147	1976	
2	First Canadian Place (First Bank Tower)	Toronto, Ontario	355 m (1,165 ft) antenna	298 m (978 ft)	72	1975	First Canadian Place
3	Inco Superstack	Sudbury, Ontario	345 m (1,132 ft)	n/a	n/a	1972	The Inco Superstack at the Inco Copper Cliff smelter.
4	Commerce Court West	Toronto, Ontario	287 m (942 ft) antenna	239 m (784 ft)	57	1972	Commerce Court West
5	Hebron platform	Grand Banks of Newfoundland	278 m (912 ft)		n/a	2017	Hebron Oil Platform
6	The St. Regis Toronto	Toronto, Ontario	277 m (909 ft) spire	237 m (778 ft)	57	2012	
7	Scotia Plaza	Toronto, Ontario	275 m (902 ft)	275 m (902 ft)	68	1988	
8	Aura (Toronto)	Toronto, Ontario	272 m (892 ft)	272 m (892 ft)	78	2014	
9	TD Canada Trust Tower	Toronto, Ontario	263 m (863 ft) (Skyscraperpage) 261 m (856 ft) (CTBUH) spire	227 m (745 ft)	53	1990	TD Canada Trust Tower
10	Number One Bloor	Toronto, Ontario	257 m (843 ft)	257 m (843 ft)	75	2015	
11	Smokestack, Flin Flon Smelter Stack	Flin Flon, Manitoba	252 m (827 ft)	n/a	n/a	1973	smokestack
12	Stantec Tower	Edmonton, Alberta	252 m (827 ft)	252 m (827 ft)	69	2018	
13	Brookfield Place (Calgary), East	Calgary, Alberta	247 m (810 ft)	247 m (810 ft)	56	2017	
14	CIBC Tower	Montreal, Quebec	250 m (820 ft) antenna	614 ft (Skyscraperpage) 604 ft (CTBUH)	45	1962	
15	West White Rose platform	Grand Banks of Newfoundland	241 m (791 ft)		n/a	2025	
16	The Bow	Calgary, Alberta	236 m (774 ft)	236 m (774 ft)	58	2011	
17	Ice Condominiums, East	Toronto, Ontario	234 m (768 ft)	234 m (768 ft)	67	2014	
18	Harbour Plaza Residences, East	Toronto, Ontario	233 m (764 ft)	233 m (764 ft)	66	2017	
19	1250 René-Lévesque	Montreal, Quebec	230 m (750 ft) (Skyscraperpage) 226 m (741 ft) (CTBUH) spire	199 m (653 ft)	47	1992	1250 René-Lévesque
20	Eau du Soleil	Toronto, Ontario	228 m (748 ft)	228 m (748 ft)	63	2017	
21 tie	Hibernia Platform	Grand Banks of Newfoundland	224 m (735 ft)	n/a	n/a	1997	
21 tie	Ten York	Toronto, Ontario	224 m (735 ft)	224 m (735 ft)	68	2017	
21 tie	Harbour Plaza Residences, West	Toronto, Ontario	224 m (735 ft)	224 m (735 ft)	62	2017	
23	TD Bank Tower	Toronto, Ontario	223 m (732 ft)	223 m (732 ft)	56	1967	
24	Telus Sky	Calgary, Alberta	222 m (728 ft)	222 m (728 ft)	60	2017	
25	Bay-Adelaide Centre West,	Toronto, Ontario	218 m (715 ft) (Skyscraperpage) 215 m (705 ft) (CTBUH)	215 m (705 ft) (S) 215 m (705 ft) (C)	52	2009	
26 tie	Smokestack, Hearn Generating Station	Toronto, Ontario	215 m (705 ft)	n/a	n/a	1971	Richard L Hearn Generating Station
26 tie	Suncor Energy Centre	Calgary, Alberta	215 m (705 ft) (Skyscraperpage) 215 m (705 ft) (CTBUH)	215 m (705 ft) (S) 215 m (705 ft) (C)	53	1983	Suncor Energy Centre
27	Shangri-La Toronto	Toronto, Ontario	215 m (705 ft) (Skyscraperpage) 214 m (702 ft) (CTBUH)	213 m (699 ft) (S) 214 m (702 ft) (C)	65	2012	
28	Eighth Avenue Place, East Tower	Calgary, Alberta	212 m (696 ft)	212 m (696 ft)	49	2011	
29	Ritz-Carlton Toronto	Toronto, Ontario	210 m (690 ft) (Skyscraperpage) 209 m (686 ft) (CTBUH)	210 m (690 ft) (S) 209 m (686 ft) (C)	52	2011	
30 tie	Bay Wellington Tower	Toronto, Ontario	208 m (682 ft) (Skyscraperpage) 207 m (679 ft) (CTBUH)	208 m (682 ft) (S) 207 m (679 ft) (C)	49	1990	Bay Wellington Tower
30 tie	Massey Tower	Toronto, Ontario	208 m (682 ft)	208 m (682 ft)	60	2018	
32	Smokestack, Wesleyville Generating Station	Wesleyville, Ontario	208 m (682 ft)	n/a	n/a	mid 1970s	
33	Residences of 488 University	Toronto, Ontario	207 m (679 ft)	207 m (679 ft)	55	2018	
34 tie	1000 de la Gauchetière	Montreal, Quebec	205 m (673 ft)	205 m (673 ft)	51	1992	1000 de La Gauchetière
34 tie	L Tower	Toronto, Ontario	205 m (673 ft)	205 m (673 ft)	57	2013	
36	Place Ville Marie	Montreal, Quebec	204 m (669 ft) antenna	188 m (617 ft)	46	1962	Place Ville-Marie
37 tie	Four Seasons Hotel and Residences	Toronto, Ontario	204 m (669 ft)	204 m (669 ft)	52	2012	
37 tie	88 Scott	Toronto, Ontario	204 m (669 ft)	204 m (669 ft)	57	2013	
39	ICE Condos, West	Toronto, Ontario	202 m (663 ft)	202 m (663 ft)	57	2013	
40	Living Shangri-La	Vancouver, British Columbia	201 m (659 ft) glass fins	197 m (646 ft)	58	2008	
41 tie	Smokestack, Lennox Generating Station Units 1+2	Bath, Ontario	198 m (650 ft)	n/a	n/a	1976	
41 tie	Smokestack, Lennox Generating Station Units 3+4	Bath, Ontario	198 m (650 ft)	n/a	n/a	1976	
41 tie	Smokestack, Thunder Bay Generating Station	Thunder Bay, Ontario	198 m (650 ft)	n/a	n/a	1984	
41 tie	YC Condominiums	Toronto, Ontario	198 m (650 ft)	198 m (650 ft)	60	2019	
47 tie	Bankers Hall - East Tower	Calgary, Alberta	197 m (646 ft)	197 m (646 ft)	52	1989	Bankers Hall - East
47 tie	Bankers Hall - West Tower	Calgary, Alberta	197 m (646 ft)	197 m (646 ft)	52	2000	Bankers Hall - West
49	Bay-Adelaide, East	Toronto, Ontario	196 m (643 ft)	196 m (643 ft)	44	2016	
50	E Condos, South	Toronto, Ontario	194 m (636 ft)	194 m (636 ft)	58	2018	
51 tie	Smokestack, Copper Cliff nickel refinery	Sudbury, Ontario	194 m (636 ft)	n/a	n/a	1954	
51 tie	Wellesley on the Park	Toronto, Ontario	194 m (636 ft)	194 m (636 ft)	60	2018	
53	JW Marriott Edmonton	Edmonton, Alberta	194 m (636 ft)	194 m (636 ft)	54		
54	Calgary Tower	Calgary, Alberta	191 m (627 ft)	n/a	n/a	1968	
55	Tour de la Bourse	Montreal, Quebec	190 m (620 ft) (antenna removed)	190 m (620 ft)	47	1964	Tour de la Bourse
56	100 Adelaide West, Ernst & Young Tower	Toronto, Ontario	188 m (617 ft)	188 m (617 ft)	40	2017	
57 tie	Paradox Hotel Vancouver	Vancouver, British Columbia	188 m (617 ft)	188 m (617 ft)	67	2016	
57 tie	Solo District - Altus	Burnaby, British Columbia	188 m (617 ft)	176 m (577 ft)	49	2016	
59	Amazing Brentwood One	Burnaby, British Columbia	186 m (610 ft)	186 m (610 ft)	56	2016	
60 tie	Maple Leaf Square, North	Toronto, Ontario	186 m (610 ft) (Skyscraperpage) 181 m (594 ft) (CTBUH)	186 m (610 ft) (S) 181 m (594 ft) (C)	54	2010	
60 tie	RBC Centre, Simcoe Place	Toronto, Ontario	186 m (610 ft) (Skyscraperpage) 185 m (607 ft) (CTBUH)	186 m (610 ft) (S) 185 m (607 ft) (C)	42	2009	
62	Smokestack, Ashbridges Bay Sewage Treatment Plant Sludge Incinerator	Toronto, Ontario	607 ft (185 m)	n/a	n/a	1970s	
63	Casa II	Toronto, Ontario	184 m (604 ft)	184 m (604 ft)	57	2016	
64	U Condominiums II	Toronto, Ontario	184 m (604 ft)	184 m (604 ft)	55	2014	
65 tie	Royal Trust Tower	Toronto, Ontario	183 m (600 ft)	183 m (600 ft)	46	1969	
65 tie	Smokestack, Coleson Cove Generating Station 1	Lorneville, New Brunswick	183 m (600 ft)	n/a	n/a	1977	
65 tie	Smokestack, Coleson Cove Generating Station	Lorneville, New Brunswick	183 m (600 ft)	n/a	n/a	2001	
65 tie	Syncrude Mildred Lake, Main Stack	Mildred Lake, Alberta	183 m (600 ft)	n/a	n/a		
69	Centennial Place I	Calgary, Alberta	183 m (600 ft) spire	165 m (541 ft)	40	2010	
70	Casa III	Toronto, Ontario	180 m (590 ft)	180 m (590 ft)	55	2018	
71	INDX Condominiums	Toronto, Ontario	179 m (587 ft)	179 m (587 ft)	54	2016	
72	Absolute World South	Mississauga, Ontario	178 m (584 ft) (Skyscraperpage) 176 m (577 ft) (CTBUH)	178 m (584 ft) (S) 176 m (577 ft) (C)	56	2011	
73 tie	400 Third	Calgary, Alberta	177 m (581 ft)	177 m (581 ft)	45	1988	Canterra Tower
73 tie	TransCanada Tower	Calgary, Alberta	177 m (581 ft)	177 m (581 ft)	38	2001	TransCanada Tower
73 tie	Hilton Niagara Falls Tower 2	Niagara Falls, Ontario	177 m (581 ft) (CTBUH)	177 m (581 ft) (CTBUH)	47	2009	
76 tie	Eighth Avenue Place, West Tower	Calgary, Alberta	177 m (581 ft)	177 m (581 ft)	41	2014	
77	Édifice Marie-Guyart	Quebec City, Quebec	176 m (577 ft) antenna	126 m (413 ft)	33	1972	
78	One King Street West	Toronto, Ontario	176 m (577 ft)	176 m (577 ft)	51	2005	
79	Olympic Stadium	Montreal, Quebec	175 m (574 ft)	n/a	n/a	1987	
80 tie	Royal Bank Plaza South	Toronto, Ontario	175 m (574 ft) (Skyscraperpage) 173 m (568 ft) (CTBUH)	175 m (574 ft) (S) 173 m (568 ft) (C)	40	1976	
80 tie	L'Avenue	Montreal, Quebec	174 m (571 ft) (Skyscraperpage) 171 m (561 ft) (CTBUH)	174 m (571 ft) (S) 171 m (561 ft) (C)	50	2010	
81 tie	Pylon of Sorel-Tracy, North Tower	Sorel-Tracy, Quebec	175 m (574 ft)	n/a	n/a		
81 tie	Pylon of Sorel-Tracy, South Tower	Sorel-Tracy, Quebec	175 m (574 ft)	n/a	n/a		
83	Maple Leaf Square South	Toronto, Ontario	174 m (571 ft) (Skyscraperpage) 171 m (561 ft) (CTBUH)	174 m (571 ft) (S) 171 m (561 ft) (C)	50	2010	
84	Sun Life Financial Tower	Toronto, Ontario	173 m (568 ft)	174 m (571 ft)	35	2016	
85 tie	Jamieson Place	Calgary, Alberta	170 m (560 ft) (Skyscraperpage) 173 m (568 ft) (CTBUH)	158 m (518 ft)	36	2010	
85 tie	Harbour Centre	Vancouver, British Columbia	170 m (560 ft) antenna	140 m (460 ft)	28	1977	
87 tie	Lambton Generating Station, Stack 1	Corunna, Ontario	557 ft or 550 ft (169.8 m)	n/a	n/a	1969-70	
87 tie	Lambton Generating Station, Stack 2	Corunna, Ontario	557 ft or 550 ft (169.8 m)	n/a	n/a	1969-70	
89	Smokestack, St. Lawrence Cement Clarkson, Mississauga	Mississauga, Ontario	169 m (554 ft)	n/a	n/a	1956	
90 tie	Smokestack, Belledune Generating Station	Belledune, New Brunswick	554 ft or 551 ft (169 m or 168 m)	n/a	n/a	1991	
90 tie	Hullmark Centre I	Toronto, Ontario	168 m (551 ft) (Skyscraperpage) 171 m (561 ft) (CTBUH)	155 m (509 ft)	45	2014	
92 tie	Lagos at the Waterfront	Toronto, Ontario	168 m (551 ft)	168 m (551 ft)	49	2016	
92 tie	Lambton Generating Station, Stack 3	Corunna, Ontario	168 m (551 ft)	n/a	n/a		
94	Tour Avenue des Canadiens	Montreal, Quebec	167 m (548 ft)	167 m (548 ft)	50	2015-6	
95	First Canadian Centre	Calgary, Alberta	167 m (548 ft)	167 m (548 ft)	41	1983	First Canadian Centre
96	2 Bloor West	Toronto, Ontario	166 m (545 ft) antenna	149 m (489 ft)	34	1974	
97	Karma	Toronto, Ontario	166 m (545 ft)	166 m (545 ft)	50	2015	
98	The Selby	Toronto, Ontario	166 m (545 ft)	166 m (545 ft)	50		
99	Western Canada Place North	Calgary, Alberta	164 m (538 ft)	164 m (538 ft)	41	1983	Western Canadian Place
100 tie	44 Charles Street West	Toronto, Ontario	163 m (535 ft) (Skyscraperpage) 166 m (545 ft) (CTBUH)	163 m (535 ft) (S) 166 m (545 ft) (C)	51	1975	
100 tie	New Port Mann Bridge, East Tower	Coquitlam & Surrey, British Columbia	163 m (535 ft)	n/a	n/a	2013	
100 tie	New Port Mann Bridge, West Tower	Coquitlam & Surrey, British Columbia	163 m (535 ft)	n/a	n/a	2013	
100 tie	Burano	Toronto, Ontario	163 m (535 ft)	160 m (520 ft) (Skyscraperpage) 163 m (535 ft) (CTBUH)	50	2012	
Height discrepancy between sources	Minto Midtown	Toronto, Ontario	160 m (520 ft) (Skyscraperpage) 165 m (541 ft) (CTBUH)	160 m (520 ft) (S) 165 m (541 ft) (C)	54	2008	

== Timeline of the tallest structures in Canada ==
Timeline of the tallest freestanding structures in Canada:

Years	Name	Location	Pinnacle height	Floor count (if applicable)	Structure type	Image
1841–1874	Notre-Dame Basilica	Montreal, Quebec	61 m (200 ft)	n/a	Church bell tower	
1874–1899	St. James Cathedral	Toronto, Ontario	93 m (305 ft)	n/a	Church bell tower	
1899–1917	Old City Hall	Toronto, Ontario	104 m (341 ft)	n/a	City Hall clock tower	
1917–1928	INCO Port Colborne Nickel Smelter Chimney #1	Port Colborne, Ontario	107 m (351 ft)	n/a	Smokestack	
1928–1929	Tour de la Banque Royale	Montreal, Quebec	121 m (397 ft)	22	Building	
1929	Fairmont Royal York Hotel	Toronto, Ontario	124 m (407 ft)	28	Building	
1929–1952	INCO Nickel Smelter, Brick Chimney	Sudbury, Ontario	500 ft (152 m)	n/a	Smokestack	
1936–1948	INCO Copper Smelter, Stack	Sudbury, Ontario	500 ft (152 m)	n/a	Smokestack	
1937–1948	INCO Port Colborne Nickel Smelter Chimney #2	Port Colborne, Ontario	500 ft (152 m)	n/a	Smokestack	
1948–1954	Cambridge Bay LORAN Tower	Cambridge Bay, Nunavut	189 m (620 ft)	n/a	Lattice tower	
1954–1967	INCO Copper Cliff Nickel Refinery (formerly Copper Cliff Iron Ore Recovery Plant), Stack	Sudbury, Ontario	194 m (636 ft)	n/a	Smokestack	
1967–1972	Toronto-Dominion Centre	Toronto, Ontario	223 m (732 ft)	56	Skyscraper	Toronto-Dominion Centre
1972–1976	Inco Superstack	Sudbury, Ontario	380 m (1,250 ft)	n/a	Smokestack	The Inco Superstack at the Inco Copper Cliff smelter.
1976–present	CN Tower	Toronto, Ontario	553 m (1,814 ft)	n/a	Tower	

Timeline of the tallest structures overall in Canada:

Years	Name	Location	Pinnacle height	Floor count (if applicable)	Structure type	Image
1841–1874	Notre-Dame Basilica	Montreal, Quebec	61 m (200 ft)	n/a	Church bell tower	
1874–1899	St. James Cathedral	Toronto, Ontario	93 m (305 ft)	n/a	Church bell tower	
1899–1917	Old City Hall	Toronto, Ontario	104 m (341 ft)	n/a	City Hall clock tower	
1917–1928	INCO Port Colborne Nickel Smelter Chimney #1	Port Colborne, Ontario	107 m (351 ft)	n/a	Smokestack	
1928–1929	Tour de la Banque Royale	Montreal, Quebec	121 m (397 ft)	22	Building	
1929	Fairmont Royal York Hotel	Toronto, Ontario	124 m (407 ft)	28	Building	
1929–1937	INCO Nickel Smelter, Brick Chimney	Sudbury, Ontario	500 ft (152 m)	n/a	Smokestack	
1936–1937	INCO Copper Smelter, Stack	Sudbury, Ontario	500 ft (152 m)	n/a	Smokestack	
1937–1954	CBL Hornby AM Transmitter	Toronto, Ontario	640/650 ft 198 m	n/a	Guyed mast	
1954–1955	CICT-DT TV Tower 1	Calgary, Alberta	670 ft 204 m	n/a	Guyed mast	
1955–1960	CKNX Television Tower	Wingham, Ontario	242 m (794 ft)	n/a	Guyed mast	
1960–1965	CHCH Television Tower	Stoney Creek, Ontario	1,172 ft (357 m)	n/a	Guyed mast	
1965–1976	Cape Race LORAN-C transmitter	Cape Race, Newfoundland	1,350 ft (410 m)	n/a	Guyed mast	
1973–1976	CKX-TV Craig Television Tower	Hayfeild, Manitoba	1,350 ft (410 m)	n/a	Guyed mast	
1976–present	CN Tower	Toronto, Ontario	553 m (1,814 ft)	n/a	Tower	

== Tallest structure by province ==
Ordered by tallest structure of any type ever built in said province. If that structure is not freestanding, then the tallest freestanding structure in said province is listed directly below the tallest structure in the above mentioned province.

Province	Name	Height	Structure	Image
Ontario freestanding	CN Tower	553 m (1815 ft)	Tower	
Newfoundland	Cape Race LORAN-C transmitter (demolished)	411.48 m (1350 ft)	Guyed mast	
Newfoundland freestanding	Hebron Platform	278 m (912 ft)	Oil platform	
Manitoba	CKX-TV Craig Television Tower	411.48 m (1350 ft)	Guyed mast	
Manitoba freestanding	Flin Flon Smelter chimney	251 m (825 ft)	Smokestack	
Quebec	CBC Tower (demolished)	371 m (1217 ft)	Guyed mast	
Quebec freestanding	CIBC Tower	250 m (820 ft)	Skyscraper and antenna	
Saskatchewan	CFRE-DT Television Tower	300 m (984 ft)	Guyed mast	
Saskatchewan freestanding	Shand Power Station, chimney	148 m (486 ft)	Smokestack	
Alberta freestanding	Stantec Tower	250.8 m (823 ft)	Skyscraper	
British Columbia freestanding	Living Shangri-La	201 m (659 ft)	Skyscraper	
New Brunswick freestanding	Coleson Cove Generating Station, chimneys	183 m (600 ft)	Smokestack	
Nova Scotia freestanding	Tufts Cove Generating Station, Trenton Generating Station & Lingan Generating Station, chimneys	152 m (500 ft)	Smokestack	The twin smoke stacks at Lingan Generating Station.
Prince Edward Island	CFCY-TV Strathgartney Transmitter	217 m (711 ft)	Guyed mast	

== Tallest observation towers in Canada ==
Name	Location	Height	Year completed	Remarks	Image
CN Tower	Toronto, Ontario	553 m (1,814 ft)	1976	Tallest freestanding structure in the world 1976-2010	
Calgary Tower	Calgary, Alberta	191 m (627 ft)	1968		
Montreal Tower	Montreal, Quebec	175 m (574 ft)	1976	Tallest inclined structure in the world	
Skylon Tower	Niagara Falls, Ontario	158 m (518 ft)	1965		
1000 Islands Tower	Hill Island, Ontario	122 m (400 ft)	1965		
La Cité de l'Énergie	Shawinigan, Quebec	115 m (377 ft)	1997		
Casino Tower	Niagara Falls, Ontario	105 m (344 ft)	1964	formerly known as the Oneida Tower and Kodak Tower	
Tower Hotel	Niagara Falls, Ontario	99 m (325 ft)	1962	formerly known as the Minolta Tower	

== Tallest guyed masts in Canada ==
Current as of April 2009
Rank	Name	Location	Height	Year completed
1	CKX-TV Craig Television Tower (rebuilt)	Hayfield, Manitoba	411 m (1,348 ft)	1986
2	CHCH-DT-3 Television Tower	Midland, Ontario	357 m (1,171 ft)	
3	CHCH-DT Television Tower (new tower)	Hamilton, Ontario	337 m (1,106 ft)	2023
4	Starbuck CBC Tower	Winnipeg, Manitoba	324 m (1,063 ft)	?
5	CIII Television Tower	Paris, Ontario	316 m (1,037 ft)	1974
6	CFPL Television Tower	London, Ontario	315 m (1,033 ft)	1961
7	CICI-TV Broadcasting Tower	Sudbury, Ontario	309 m (1,014 ft)	
8	CJSD Broadcasting Tower	Shuniah, Ontario	308 m (1,010 ft)	
9	CIII-TV-2/GLOBAL TV Tower	Bancroft, Ontario	307 m (1,007 ft)	
10 tie	CKVR Television Tower	Barrie, Ontario	305 m (1,000 ft)	1978
10 tie	CHEX Television Tower	Peterborough, Ontario	305 m (1,000 ft)	
11	CKCO-42 Television Tower	Oil Springs, Ontario	303 m (994 ft)	1975
12 tie	CHCH-51 Television Tower	Alvinston, Ontario	300 m (980 ft)	1998
12 tie	Communication Hill, CBC Tower	London, Ontario	300 m (980 ft)	
12 tie	CFRE-DT Television Tower	Regina, Saskatchewan	300 m (980 ft)	
13	Weyburn Television Tower	Weyburn, Saskatchewan	296 m (971 ft)	
14	Woodstock Television Tower	Sweaburg, Ontario	293 m (961 ft)	1986
15	CKCO Television Tower	Baden, Ontario	292 m (958 ft)	2000
16	TVO London Tower	London, Ontario	902 ft. (275 m)	1975
17	Cape Race LORAN-C transmitter (new tower)	Cape Race, Newfoundland	259 m (850 ft)	1993
18	CIIT-TV Tower	Winnipeg, Manitoba	257 m (843 ft)	
19 tie	CICT-TV Tower 1	Calgary, Alberta	250 m (820 ft)	1954
19 tie	CICT-TV Tower 2	Calgary, Alberta	250 m (820 ft)	1954
20	CKNX Television Tower	Wingham, Ontario	242 m (794 ft)	1955
21	SRC Kitchener Tower	St. Agatha, Ontario	229 m (751 ft)	
22	Ryan Tower	Chelsea, Quebec	750.8 ft (228.8 m)	1968
23	Hwy 46, CBC Transmitter	Regina, Saskatchewan	223 m (732 ft)	
24	Fox Harbour LORAN-C transmitter	St. Lewis, Labrador	220 m (720 ft)	1983

== Tallest lattice towers in Canada ==
indicates a structure that is no longer standing.

Tower	Year	Town	Height m	Height ft	Structure Type	Remarks
Cambridge Bay LORAN Tower	1948	Cambridge Bay	189 m	620 ft	LORAN-C transmitter	demolished in August 2014
Tracy Saint Lawrence River Powerline Crossing North Tower	?	Tracy	174.6 m	573 ft	Hydro pylon	tallest set of electricity pylons in Canada
Tracy Saint Lawrence River Powerline Crossing South Tower	?	Tracy	174.6 m	573 ft	Hydro pylon	tallest set of electricity pylons in Canada
CBC Jarvis St. Tower	1952	Toronto	164.6 m	540 ft	Radio tower	demolished in 2002
Bell Canada Pharmacy Avenue Tower	1970	Toronto	160 m	525 ft	Microwave relay tower	
Montreal-Varennes Crossing, North Tower		Varennes	157 m	525 ft	Hydro pylon	
Montreal-Varennes Crossing, South Tower		Varennes	160 m	515 ft	Hydro pylon	
CFCN TV Tower	1960	Calgary	157.6 m	517 ft	TV tower	
Saint Lawrence River HVDC Powerline Crossing North Tower	1989	Deschambault-Grondines	140.2 m	460 ft	Hydro pylon	dismantled in 1992
Saint Lawrence River HVDC Powerline Crossing South Tower	1989	Deschambault-Grondines	140.2 m	460 ft	Hydro pylon	dismantled in 1992
		Brantford	138 m	453 ft	Radio tower	43°08'57.0"N 80°14'02.0"W
Montreal East Crossing, North Tower		Montreal	137 m	450 ft	Hydro pylon	
Montreal East Crossing, South Tower		Montreal	137 m	450 ft	Hydro pylon	
Montreal West Crossing, North Tower		Montreal	137 m	450 ft	Hydro pylon	
Montreal West Crossing, South Tower		Montreal	137 m	450 ft	Hydro pylon	
CFCM DT Tower	1954	Quebec City	134 m	440 ft	Radio tower	dismantled in 2022
	2018	Wheatley	132 m	433 ft	Radio tower	42°08'18.2"N 82°27'19.7"W

== Tallest smokestacks/chimneys in Canada ==
indicates a structure that is no longer standing.
Demolished structures are not ranked but left in their previous position on the list.

Rank	Name of Facility	Location	Height in feet and meters	Construction material	Type of facility	Current status	Flue diameter (m)	Year completed	Image
1	Inco Superstack	Sudbury, Ontario	345 m (1,132 ft)	Concrete	Smelter	Demolition to commence in 2025.	13.7	1972	The Inco Superstack at the Inco Copper Cliff smelter.
2	Flin Flon Smelter, Stack	Flin Flon, Manitoba	251 m (823 ft)	Concrete	Smelter	Unused		1973	smokestack
3	Hearn Generating Station, Stack	Toronto	215 m (705 ft)	Concrete	Power plant	Unused		1971	Richard L Hearn Generating Station
4	Wesleyville Generating Station, Stack	Wesleyville, Ontario	208 m (682 ft)	Concrete	Power plant	Unused		1970s	
	Nanticoke Generating Station, Stack 1 (Units 1-4)	Nanticoke, Ontario	198 m (650 ft)	Concrete	Power plant	Demolished in 2018	10.98	1972	
	Nanticoke Generating Station, Stack 2 (Units 5-8)	Nanticoke, Ontario	198 m (650 ft)	Concrete	Power plant	Demolished in 2018	10.98	1974	(see above^)
5 tie	Lennox Generating Station, Stack 1 (Units 1&2)	Bath, Ontario	198 m (650 ft)	Concrete	Power plant	In use	7.3	1976	
5 tie	Lennox Generating Station, Stack 2 (Units 3&4)	Bath, Ontario	198 m (650 ft)	Concrete	Power plant	In use	7.3	1976	(see above^)
	Thunder Bay Generating Station, Stack	Thunder Bay, Ontario	198 m (650 ft)	Concrete	Power plant	Demolished in 2021	4.3	1984	Thunder Bay Generating Station
7	Copper Cliff Nickel Refinery, Stack	Sudbury, Ontario	194 m (636 ft)	Concrete	Smelter	In use	9.1	1954	
8	Ashbridges Bay Wastewater Treatment Plant, Sludge Incinerator Stack	Toronto	185 m (607 ft)	Concrete	Incinerator	In use		1977-79	
9 tie	Coleson Cove Generating Station, FGD Stack(2 Flue)	Lorneville, New Brunswick	600 ft (183 m)	Concrete	Power plant	In use	4.87	2001	
9 tie	Coleson Cove Generating Station, 1st Stack(3 Flue)	Lorneville, New Brunswick	600 ft (182.8m)	Concrete	Power plant		4.87	1977	
9 tie	Syncrude Mildred Lake, Main Stack	Mildred Lake, Alberta	600 ft (182.8 m)	Concrete	Oil refinery	In use	7.9		
	Lambton Generating Station, Stack 1	Corunna, Ontario	557 ft or 550 ft (169.8 m)	Concrete	Power plant	Demolished in 2022	7.49	1969-70	
	Lambton Generating Station, Stack 2	Corunna, Ontario	557 ft of 550 ft (169.8 m)	Concrete	Power plant	Demolished in 2022	7.49	1969-70	(see above^)
12	Holcim (Canada) Mississauga Cement Plant (formerly St. Lawrence Cement), Stack	Mississauga, Ontario	169 m (554 ft)	Concrete	Cement plant	In use	3.96	1956	
13	Belledune Generating Station, Stack 1	Belledune, New Brunswick	554 ft or 551 ft (169 m or 168 m)	Concrete	Power plant	In use	6.86	1991	
	Dalhousie Generating Station #2, FDG Stack	Dalhousie, New Brunswick	551 ft (167.64 m)	Concrete	Power plant	Demolished in 2015	6.45	1993	
	Noranda Inc. Gaspe Site, Stack	Murdochville, Quebec	550 ft (167.6 m)	Concrete	Smelter	Demolished in 2003			
	Lambton Generating Station, Stack 3	Corunna, Ontario	550 ft (167.6 m)	Concrete	Power plant	Demolished in 2022	7.11		
	Dalhousie Generating Station #1, Stack 1	Dalhousie, New Brunswick	532 ft (162 m)	Concrete	Power plant	Demolished in 2015		1980	
14	Battle River Generating Station, Stack C (Unit 5)	Battle River, Alberta	528 ft (161 m)	Concrete	Power plant	In use	5.791	1981	
15	Sundance Power Station, Stack 1 (Unit 1&2)	Wabamun Lake, Alberta	512 ft (156 m)	Concrete	Power plant	In use	6.401	1970-73	
16 tie	Sundance Power Station, Stack 2 (Unit 3&4)	Wabamun Lake, Alberta	510 ft (155.5 m)	Concrete	Power plant	In use	7.32	1976-77	
16 tie	Sundance Power Station, Stack 3 (Unit 5&6)	Wabamun Lake, Alberta	510 ft (155.5 m)	Concrete	Power plant	In use	7.315	1978-80	
	INCO Nickel Smelter, Stack	Sudbury, Ontario	500 ft (152.4 m)	Brick	Smelter	Dismantled in 1982	14.6 (48 feet)	1929	
18 tie	INCO Copper Smelter, Stack	Sudbury, Ontario	500 ft (152.4 m)	Concrete	Smelter	Reduced to 435 ft (132.5 m) then dismantled in 2024/2025	13.4 (44 feet)	1936	
	INCO Nickel Smelter, Stack 2	Port Colborne, Ontario	500 ft (152.4 m)	Concrete	Smelter	Dismantled in 1994	5.49 (18 feet)	1937	
18 tie	INCO Thompson Smelter, Stack	Thompson, Manitoba	500 ft (152 m)	Concrete	Smelter	In use	9.14	1958	
20 tie	Tufts Cove Generating Station, Stack 1	Tufts Cove, Nova Scotia	500 ft (152 m)	Concrete	Power plant	In use	2.44	1965	
20 tie	Tufts Cove Generating Station, Stack 2	Tufts Cove, Nova Scotia	500 ft (152 m)	Concrete	Power plant	In use	2.44	1972	(see above^)
20 tie	Tufts Cove Generating Station, Stack 3	Tufts Cove, Nova Scotia	500 ft (152.4 m)	Concrete	Power plant	In use	3	1976	(see above^)
20 tie	Lingan Generating Station, Stack 1	Lingan, Nova Scotia	500 ft (152.4 m)	Concrete	Power plant	In use	4.7	1979	The twin smoke stacks at Lingan Generating Station.
20 tie	Lingan Generating Station, Stack 2	Lingan, Nova Scotia	500 ft (152.4 m)	Concrete	Power plant	In use	4.7	1979	The twin smoke stacks at Lingan Generating Station.
20 tie	Trenton Generating Station, Stack 1 (Unit 6)	Trenton, Nova Scotia	500 ft (152.4 m)	Concrete	Power plant	In use	4.7	1969	
	Lakeview Generating Station, Stack 1	Mississauga, Ontario	492 ft or 479 ft (150 m or 146 m)	Concrete	Power plant	Demolished in 2006		1961	
	Lakeview Generating Station, Stack 2	Mississauga, Ontario	492 ft or 479 ft (150 m or 146 m)	Concrete	Power plant	Demolished in 2006		1962	(see above^)
	Lakeview Generating Station, Stack 3	Mississauga, Ontario	492 ft or 479 ft (150 m or 146 m)	Concrete	Power plant	Demolished in 2006		1964	(see above^)
	Lakeview Generating Station, Stack 4	Mississauga, Ontario	492 ft or 479 ft (150 m or 146 m)	Concrete	Power plant	Demolished in 2006		1965	(see above^)
26	Shand Power Station, Stack	Estevan, Saskatchewan	486 ft (148 m)	Concrete	Power plant	In use	5	1992	
27	Atikokan Generating Station, Stack	Atikokan, Ontario	476 ft (145 m)	Concrete	Power plant	Undergoing refurbishment	5.5	1985	
28 tie	Keephills Generating Station, Stack 2 (Unit 3)	Keephills, Alberta	455 ft (138.6 m)	Concrete	Power plant	In use	7.77		
28 tie	Keephills Generating Station, Stack 1 (Unit 1&2)	Keephills, Alberta	455 ft (138.6 m)	Concrete	Power Plant	In use	5.75	1983-84	
30	Genesee Generating Station, Stack 2 (Unit 3)	Genesee, Alberta	453 ft (138 m)	Concrete	Power plant	In use	5.74	2005	
31 tie	Xstrata Nickel Smelter, Stack	Sudbury, Ontario	450 ft 137.2 m	Concrete	Smelter	Unused		1965	
31 tie	Enwave Walton Street Steam Plant, Stack	Toronto	450 ft 137.2 m	Concrete	Steam Plant	In use	2.6	1971	
31 tie	Commissioners Street Incinerator, Stack	Toronto	450 ft 137.2 m	Concrete	Incinerator	Unused			
31 tie	Suncor Energy Oil Sands, FGD Stack	Fort McMurray, Alberta	450 ft 137.2 m	Concrete	Oil refinery	In use	7.01		
31 tie	Battle River Generating Station, Stack B (Unit 3&4)	Battle River, Alberta	450 ft (137 m)	Concrete	Power plant	In use	6.096	1969-75	
31 tie	Inco Superstack replacement 1	Sudbury, Ontario	137 m (449 ft)	Concrete	Smelter	In use		2020	
31 tie	Inco Superstack replacement 2	Sudbury, Ontario	137 m (449 ft)	Concrete	Smelter	In use		2020	

The Tracy Thermal Generating Station has four 449 ft (137 m) stacks.

== Tallest destroyed/demolished structures in Canada ==
There are two separate lists; one for free standing structures and one for guyed masts. This is because of incomplete information regarding the height and number of demolished guyed masts.

Tallest freestanding demolished structures:

Rank	Building	City	Height	Structure type	Build material	Year built/demolished	Recording of event	Notable for
1 tie	Smokestack 1 (Units 1-4), Nanticoke Generating Station	Nanticoke, Ontario	198 m/650 ft	Smokestack	Concrete	1972-2018	Video on YouTube	(demolished by explosives) Tied for the tallest freestanding structure demolished in Canada.
1 tie	Smokestack 2 (Units 5-8), Nanticoke Generating Station	Nanticoke, Ontario	198 m/650 ft	Smokestack	Concrete	1974-2018	(see above)	(demolished by explosives) Tied for the tallest freestanding structure demolished in Canada.
1 tie	Smokestack, Thunder Bay Generating Station	Thunder Bay Ontario	198 m/650 ft	Smokestack	Concrete	1984-2021	Video on YouTube	(demolished by explosives) Tied for the tallest freestanding structure demolished in Canada.
4	Cambridge Bay LORAN Tower	Cambridge Bay, Nunavut	189 m/620 ft	Lattice tower	Steel	1948–2014		(demolition by undermining) Tallest freestanding structure in Canada from 1948 to 1954
5 tie	Lambton Generating Station, Stack 1	Corunna, Ontario	169.8 m/557 ft	Smokestack	Concrete	1970-2022	Video on YouTube	(demolished by explosives)
5 tie	Lambton Generating Station, Stack 2	Corunna, Ontario	169.8 m/557 ft	Smokestack	Concrete	1970-2022	(see above)	(demolished by explosives)
7 tie	Smokestack, Noranda Inc. Gaspe Site	Murdochville, Quebec	168 m/550 ft	Smokestack	Concrete	unknown-2003		(demolished by explosives) Tallest freestanding structure demolished in Quebec
7 tie	Smokestack, Dalhousie Generating Station #2	Dalhousie, New Brunswick	168 m/550 ft	Smokestack	Concrete	unknown-2015	Video on YouTube Video on YouTube	(demolished by explosives) Tallest structure demolished in New Brunswick
7 tie	Lambton Generating Station, Stack 3	Corunna, Ontario	168 m/550 ft	Smokestack	Concrete	unknown-2022	Video on YouTube	(demolished by explosives)
10	CBC Jarvis St. Tower	Toronto, Ontario	164 m/540 ft	Lattice tower	Steel	1952–2002		(demolition by undermining) Tallest freestanding structure in Toronto from 1952 to 1967
11	Smokestack, Dalhousie Generating Station #1	Dalhousie, New Brunswick	162 m/532 ft	Smokestack	Concrete	1967-2015	Video on YouTube	(demolished by explosives)
12 tie	INCO Nickel Smelter, Brick Smokestack	Sudbury, Ontario	152.4 m/500 ft	Smokestack	Brick	1929–1982		(dismantled) Tallest freestanding structure in Canada from 1929 to 1948
12 tie	INCO - Port Colborne Nickel Smelter Smokestack #2	Port Colborne, Ontario	152.4 m/500 ft	Smokestack	Concrete	1937–1994		(dismantled) Equaled tallest freestanding structure in Canada from 1937 to 1948
14 tie	Lakeview Generating Station Smokestack Units 1+2	Mississauga, Ontario	150 m/493 ft	Smokestack	Concrete	1961–2006	Video on YouTube	(demolished by explosives)
14 tie	Lakeview Generating Station Smokestack Units 3+4	Mississauga, Ontario	150 m/493 ft	Smokestack	Concrete	1962–2006	(see above)	(demolished by explosives)
14 tie	Lakeview Generating Station Smokestack Units 5+6	Mississauga, Ontario	150 m/493 ft	Smokestack	Concrete	1964–2006	Video on YouTube	(demolished by explosives)
14 tie	Lakeview Generating Station Smokestack Units 7+8	Mississauga, Ontario	150 m/493 ft	Smokestack	Concrete	1965–2006	(see above)	(demolished by explosives)
18	Battle River Generating Station Smokestack Units 1&2	Battle River, Alberta	122 m/400 ft	Smokestack	Concrete			(demolished by explosives) Tallest structure to be demolished in Alberta
19	Empire Landmark Hotel	Vancouver, British Columbia	121 m/396 ft	Building	Concrete	1973-2019		Demolished floor by floor between March 2018 and May 2019. Tallest building to be demolished in Canada. Tallest structure to be demolished in British Columbia.
20 tie	INCO - Port Colborne Nickel Smelter Smokestack #1	Port Colborne, Ontario	106.7 m/350 ft	Smokestack	Brick	1917–1966		(demolished by explosives) Tallest freestanding structure in Canada from 1917 to 1928
20 tie	INCO - Orford Stack	Sudbury, Ontario	106.7 m/350 ft	Smokestack	Concrete			
20 tie	Thunder Bay Generating Station, Condensing Unit Smokestack	Thunder Bay, Ontario	106.7 m or 110 m/350 ft or 361 ft	Smokestack	Concrete	1962–1998	Video on YouTube	(demolished by explosives)
23 tie	Bruce Nuclear Generating Station Steam Plant Smokestack	Kincardine, Ontario	100 m/328 ft	Smokestack	Concrete	unknown–2015	Video on YouTube	(demolished by explosives)
24	St. Lawrence Starch Plant Smokestack	Mississauga, Ontario	97.5 m/320 ft	Smokestack	Concrete	1971–1994		(demolished by explosives)
25 tie	Canadian Nuclear Laboratories B444 Process Water Tower	Deep River, Ontario	91.4 m/300 ft	Water Tower	Steel	1956–2017	Video on YouTube	(demolished by explosives)
25 tie	Oakville Assembly Paint Stack	Oakville, Ontario	91.4 m/300 ft	Smokestack	Steel	unknown–2012	Video on YouTube	(demolished by explosives)
na	Old Toronto Star Building	Toronto, Ontario	88 m/289 ft	Building		1927–1972		Second tallest building to be demolished in Canada. Tallest building to be demolished in Ontario.
na	Hotel Laurentien	Montreal, Quebec	78 m/255 ft	Building		1948–1978		Tallest building in Quebec to be demolished.
na	Hotel Vancouver (1916)	Vancouver, British Columbia	77 m/253 ft	Building		1916–1949		

Tallest demolished guyed masts:

Rank	Building	City	Height	Year built/demolished
1	Cape Race LORAN-C transmitter	Cape Race, Newfoundland	411.48 m/1350 ft	1965–1993 (collapsed)
2	CKX-TV Craig Television Tower	Hayfield, Manitoba	411.48 m/1350 ft	1973–1983 (collapsed)
3	CBC Tower	Shawinigan, Quebec	371 m/1217 ft	1972–2001 (demolished by explosives after aircraft collision)
4	CHCH Television Tower	Stoney Creek, Ontario	357 m (1,171 ft)	1960–2024
4	CKVR-TV	Barrie, Ontario	305 m/1000 ft	1976–1977 (demolished by aircraft collision)
5	CFTO AM Transmitting Tower	Toronto, Ontario	279 m/916 ft	1960-unknown

== See also ==
- List of tallest buildings in Canada
- List of old Canadian buildings
- Architecture of Canada
- Architecture of Montreal
- Architecture of Ottawa
- Architecture of Toronto
- Architecture of Quebec City
- List of tallest structures in Saskatchewan

== Sources ==
Skyscraperpage

- "Diagrams - SkyscraperPage.com". skyscraperpage.com.
- "Diagrams - SkyscraperPage.com". skyscraperpage.com.
- "Database - SkyscraperPage.com". skyscraperpage.com.

Emporis

- Calgary -
- Montreal -
- Niagara Falls -
- Toronto -
- Vancouver -

CTBUH

- "CTBUH Tall Building Database | The Skyscraper Center". buildingdb.ctbuh.org.

Other

- "Ontario Radio and TV Dial Guide - Michiguide.com Dials". michiguide.com.
