= CBC Tower =

The CBC Tower may refer to:

- CBC Tower (Mont-Carmel), a broadcast transmission tower near Shawinigan, Quebec, Canada
- CBC Jarvis Street Tower, a broadcast transmission tower in Toronto, Ontario, Canada
