= Hardy Island (New Brunswick) =

Island in New Brunswick, Canada

- Interactive map of Hardy Island

Geography
- Location: Bay of Fundy
- Coordinates: 45°11′58″N 66°09′17″W
- Area: 3 acres (1.2 ha)

Administration
- Canada
- Province: New Brunswick
- County: Saint John

Hardy Island is a tidal island in the city of Saint John, Saint John County, New Brunswick, Canada. It is located on the west side, 200 metres off the coast in Lorneville Harbour.

In October 2025, a forest fire on the island destroyed many of the trees, and was difficult to extinguish as it burned underground.
