= Lennox Generating Station =

Power station in Ontario, Canada, commissioned 1976

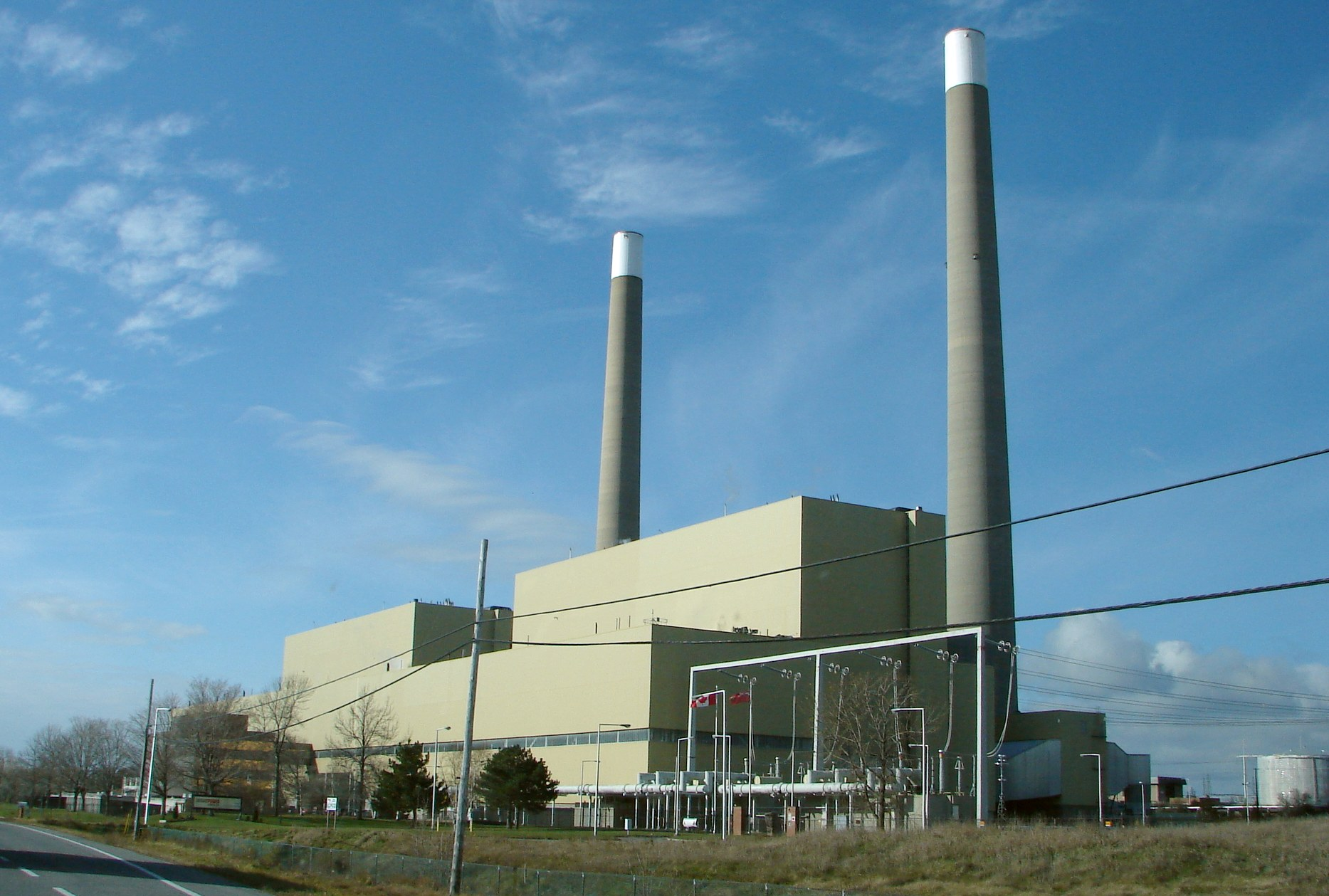
- Location within southern Ontario
- Country: Canada
- Location: 7263 33 Highway West, Greater Napanee, Ontario K0H 1G0
- Coordinates: 44°08′46″N 76°51′09″W
- Status: Operational
- Commission date: 1976
- Owner: Ontario Power Generation

Thermal power station
- Primary fuel: Natural gas
- Secondary fuel: Fuel oil
- Turbine technology: Steam turbine

Power generation
- Units operational: 4 × 535 MW
- Nameplate capacity: 2,140 MW
- Capacity factor: 1.5%

External links
- Website: opg.com/powering-ontario/our-generation/gas-power/

Lennox Generating Station is a natural gas- and fuel oil-fired power station in Lennox and Addington County, Ontario, Canada. Owned and operated by Ontario Power Generation, it is situated on Highway 33 on the north shore of Lake Ontario, 2 miles (3.2 km) west of Bath, Ontario. It is the largest natural gas power station in Canada by installed capacity.

In the 1970s, Lennox was a solely oil-fired plant in an era of rising oil prices. Oil is delivered by tanker cars via a spur of the Montreal-Kingston-Toronto CN Rail line. From 1982 to 1987 the plant was placed in reserve to surplus power in Ontario. In 1997, the plant was converted to operate with either heavy oil or natural gas. In 2008, the plant obtained regulatory approval for an ozone generation system to control zebra mussel fouling of service water intake pipes.

As of 2007, Lennox represented 50% of Ontario installed generation capacity east of the Toronto zone. When operating at full capacity, the plant claims to be the largest user of natural gas in Ontario. The facility is operated solely at times of peak load; the base load for the Ottawa-Toronto region is supplied by Pickering and Darlington stations in Durham Region and by an asynchronous interconnection with Hydro-Québec which has served Ottawa since 2010.

It is common to operate on natural gas during the summer season and switch to oil in the winter, when demand is high for gas.

== Description ==
The Lennox Generating Station consists of:

- 4 535 MW units
- 2 smokestacks - each 650 feet (200 m) tall.

In 2012, Ontario's government announced an additional 900-megawatt TransCanada Energy natural gas plant (ultimately called the Napanee Generation Station) to be built at the Lennox Generating Station site; the project was originally planned for Oakville, Ontario but the location was changed in 2010 as part of a controversial government decision to relocate it and another gas-fired power plant. While estimates vary, the additional costs to transport natural gas eastward and generated power westward are expected to represent hundreds of millions of dollars over the lifetime of the new generation plant; one report claims $675 million. The relocation of this proposed plant, and another proposed for Mississauga but displaced to Sarnia's Lambton Generating Station, were key political issues in 2011 and 2014 Ontario elections.

As of 2012, the site employed 160 people; at which time is was announced that an additional 25 permanent jobs would be added as a result of the 900MW expansion.

== Emissions ==
Greenhouse Gases (2012)
| Greenhouse gas | Sum (tonnes) | Sum (tonnes CO_{2}e*) |
|---|---|---|
| CO_{2} | 180,585 | 180,585 |
| CH_{4} | 42 | 882 |
| N_{2}O | 5 | 1,550 |
| Total | —N/a | 183,017 |

*Calculated figures for CO_{2}e are rounded to the nearest tonne.

Annual emissions
| Year | Emissions (tonnes CO_{2}e) |
|---|---|
| 2004 | 638,074 |
| 2005 | 986,676 |
| 2006 | 305,106 |
| 2007 | 607,761 |
| 2008 | 288,674 |
| 2009 | 222,470 |
| 2010 | 121,412 |
| 2011 | 103,652 |
| 2012 | 183,017 |

== See also ==
- List of largest power stations in Canada
- List of tallest structures in Canada
