= Trenton Generating Station =

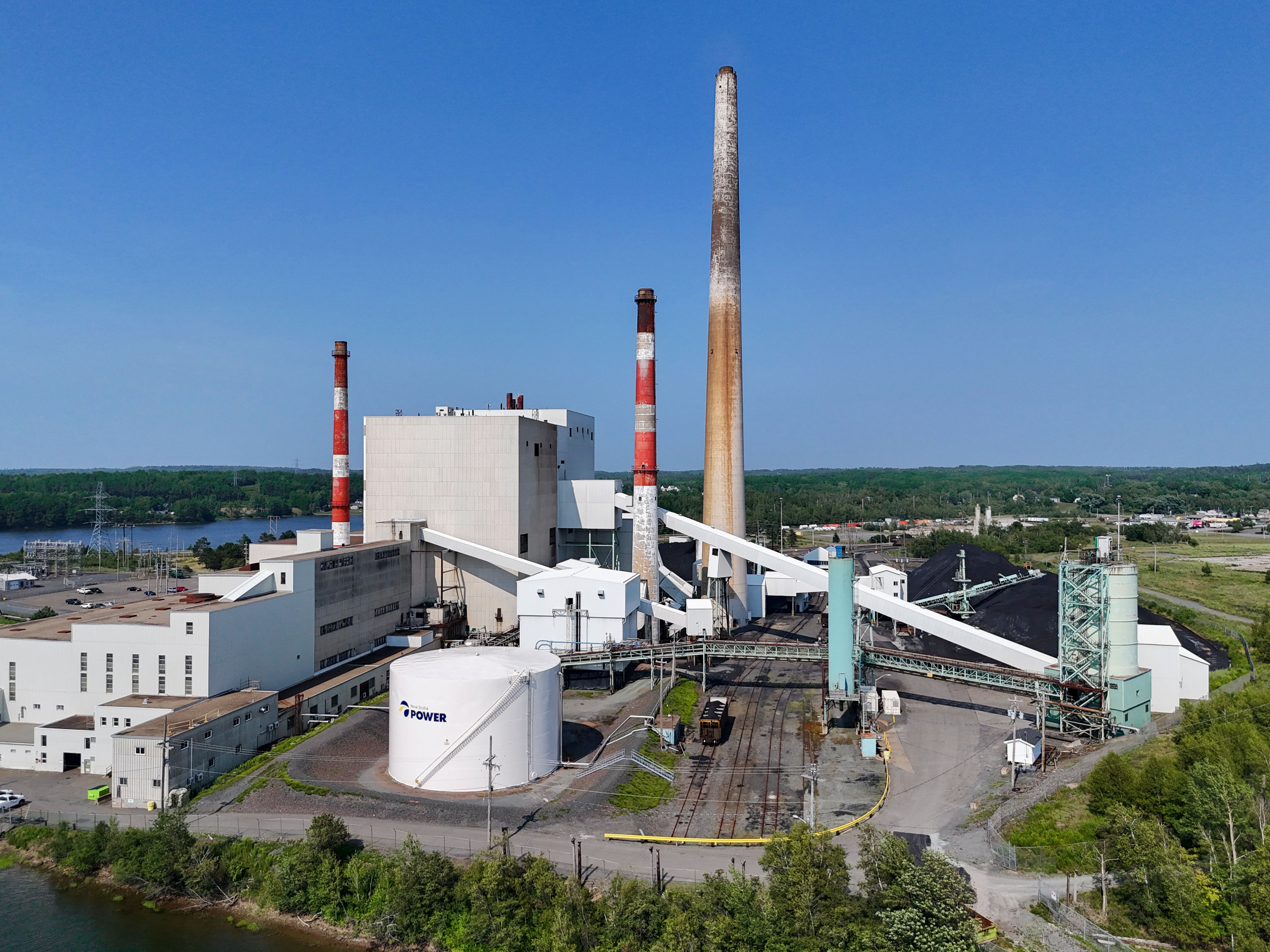
- Viewed from the West
- Trenton Generating Station, Nova Scotia
- Country: Canada
- Location: Trenton, Nova Scotia
- Coordinates: 45.6209°N 62.6467°W
- Status: Operational
- Commission date: 1969
- Owner: Nova Scotia Power

Thermal power station
- Primary fuel: Coal

Power generation
- Nameplate capacity: 310 MW

External links
- Commons: Related media on Commons

The Trenton Generating Station or Trenton GS is a 310 MW Canadian thermal generating station located in the town of Trenton, Nova Scotia.

The plant is located on the banks of the East River in the town of Trenton. There are a total of six units at the site although not all are operating at the current time. Units 1 and 2 were completed by the Nova Scotia Power Commission by 1952. The third unit came on-line in 1955 and the fourth in 1960. When the 150 MW Unit 5 went into production in 1970, the Trenton plant was the largest single thermal generating station in the Atlantic Provinces at that time. Unit 6 was commissioned in 1991. The initial boilers (Units 1 to 4) were designed to burn coal mined nearby in Pictou County as well as on Cape Breton Island. Units 5 and 6 could burn either coal or Bunker C oil.

The current operating units (5 & 6) burn coal or oil and feature two chimneys; one 152 m (500 ft) and one 92 m (300 ft). The taller stack is tied with those at Lingan Generating Station and Tufts Cove Generating Station as the tallest freestanding structure in Nova Scotia.

The plant consumes 0.8 million tonnes of coal per year and currently generates approximately 12% of the province's electricity and produces roughly 10% of the province's air pollution, including hydrochloric acid, sulphuric acid, hexachlorobenzene and mercury. Emissions from the station in the form of particulates are a frequent source of pollution complaints in the neighbourhood and region. However, both Trenton units have electrostatic precipitators designed to capture 99% of fly ash emissions from coal burning.

While the early boilers burned local coal from Pictou County, the larger units (5 & 6) sourced coal from Cape Breton Island from the Cape Breton Development Corporation (DEVCO). Coal was transported to Trenton from Sydney by rail using CN Rail and later the Cape Breton & Central Nova Scotia Railway.

== History ==
Unit 5, built at a cost of around $27 million, was officially opened by Nova Scotia premier George Isaac Smith and federal manpower minister Allan MacEachen on 6 July 1970.

During the fall-winter-spring of 1991–1992, the generating station burnt locally mined coal from the Westray Mine, located several kilometres south of the plant; the mine was permanently closed on May 9, 1992 after a disastrous methane gas explosion destroyed the mine, killing 26 workers.

With the resumption of coal mining at Stellarton in 1996, the Trenton Generating Station was partially supplied with coal from the nearby Stellarton Surface Coal Mine. The Stellarton Surface Coal Mine ceased operations in 2022, and the process of filling in the pit began in 2023. Following the closure of DEVCO mines in 2001, Trenton GS was supplied with coal imported from the United States and South America, shipped to a bulk unloading terminal on the Strait of Canso at Point Tupper, then taken by CB&CNS trains to Trenton. The plant is equipped to receive coal from barges entering from the Northumberland Strait through Pictou Harbour; the Trenton Connector Road runs immediately north of the plant and is equipped with a draw-bridge over the East River of Pictou, although the bridge is rarely operated.

It is anticipated that the two remaining units at the Trenton Generating Station will be retired in 2028 and 2029, as part of Nova Scotia's phase-out of coal-powered electricity generation.

== See also ==
- List of power stations in Canada
- List of tallest structures in Canada
