= CFPL Television Tower =

Guyed mast in London, Ontario, Canada

Coordinates: 42°56′58.92″N 81°15′51.84″W

CFPL Television Tower is a 315 m (1,033 ft) supertall guyed mast used for television broadcasting in London, Ontario. It is currently the 6th tallest guyed mast in Canada as well as the 9th tallest structure in the country.

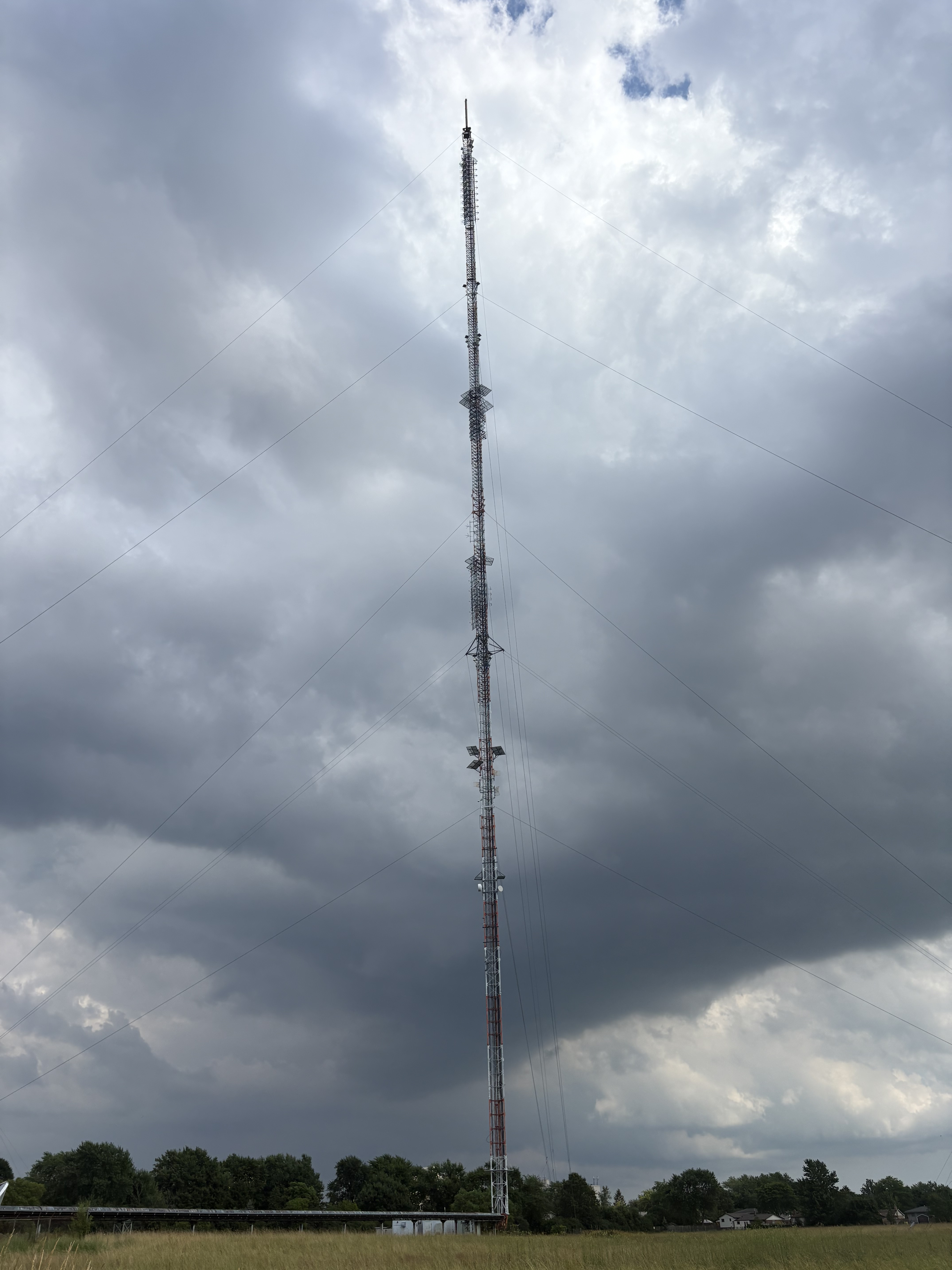
CFPL Television Tower as seen from below.

The structure was built in 1961 and was the second supertall (300m+) TV tower to be built in Canada as well as the second tallest structure in Canada at that time. Only the CHCH Television Tower in Stoney Creek was taller. The current tower replaced the original 576-foot (176 m) CFPL Television Tower completed in 1953.

CFPL Television Tower is currently the tallest structure in London and one of only two supertall structures in the area, the other being Communication Hill CBC Tower at 300m.

== See also ==
- List of masts
