= Jerry Lonecloud =

Entertainer in Nova Scotia, Canada

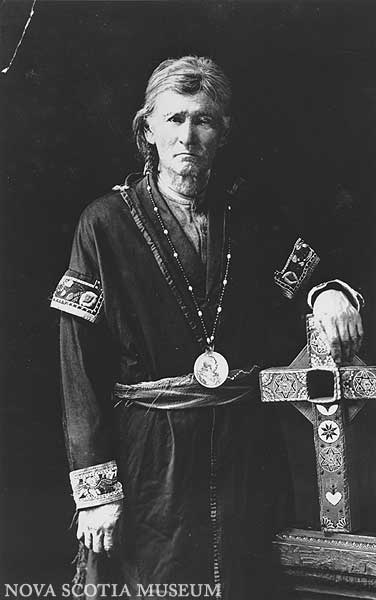
- Born: Germain Bartlett Alexis; July 4, 1854; Belfast, Maine
- Died: April 16, 1930 (aged 75); Halifax, Nova Scotia
- Occupations: Entertainer, Ethnographer, Medicine man
- Notable work: Tracking Dr. Lonecloud: Showman to Legend Keeper

Jerry Lonecloud (July 4, 1854 – April 16, 1930) served as an entertainer, ethnographer, and medicine man among the Mi'kmaq people in Nova Scotia. His oral memoirs, comprising Mi'kmaw oral histories and legends, were documented from 1923 to 1929. These memoirs were later compiled into a book—Tracking Dr. Lonecloud: Showman to Legend Keeper—by ethnographer and historian Ruth Holmes Whitehead at the Nova Scotia Museum in Halifax in 2002. These recordings laid the foundation for the 2002 biography, the first known Mi'kmaq memoir. According to Whitehead, Lonecloud could "rightly" be called the "ethnographer of the Micmac nation."

== Early life ==
Lonecloud was born on 4 July 1852 in Belfast, Maine, to Mi'kmaw parents originally from Nova Scotia. His birth name was Germain Bartlett Alexis. He learned about traditional medicine from his parents at a young age. In the 1880s, when he started his career as a showman, he adopted the name Jerry Lonecloud. He lived in Vermont for some time. After the deaths of his parents at the age of 14 in 1868, he began a two-year search to find his brother and his two sisters to return with them to Nova Scotia.

== Career ==
=== Dr. Lonecloud ===
In the 1890s, while performing in Medicine Shows and Wild West shows—including John Healy and Charles Bigelow's Kickapoo Indian medicine, Buffalo Bill Cody's Wild West Show and the Kiowa Medicine Show—Lonecloud started using the moniker Dr. Lonecloud.

=== Ethnographer ===
Lonecloud's ethnographic and archival work is recorded in his biography co-authored by ethnographer and historian Ruth Holmes Whitehead, journalist Clara Dennis, and Lonecloud himself. Dennis's interviews with Lonecloud, recorded from 1923 to 1929, form the core of the biography. The 1920s recordings with Dennis include Mi'kmaw legends, oral histories, jokes, and social customs that hadn't been published before the release of the 2002 biography.

In his role as an ethnographer, Lonecloud collaborated extensively with historian and archivist Harry Piers.

== Personal life ==
On December 6, 1917, during the Halifax Explosion, Lonecloud and his family were living in Tufts Cove in Dartmouth. The catastrophe killed two of his daughters and cost him an eye.

Lonecloud died in Halifax on April 16, 1930.

== Legacy ==
- The musical group Lone Cloud is named after him.
- Lonecloud Island (site of a former Scouts Camp) in Fall River, Nova Scotia bears his name.
- The Jerry Lonecloud Trail in Cole Harbour, Nova Scotia is named in his honor.
- A display dedicated to him can be seen at the Nova Scotia Museum of Natural History.
