= CKX-TV Craig Television Tower =

Transmitter mast in Hayfield, Manitoba

Coordinates: 49°40′08″N 100°00′42″W

The CKX-TV Craig broadcasting tower is a 411.5 m (1,350 ft) high guyed TV mast located in Brandon, Manitoba, Canada. It is currently the second-tallest structure in Canada. The current structure is the second version built at the site. When the original mast was built in 1973, the CKX-TV Craig broadcasting tower matched the height of the Cape Race LORAN-C transmitter as the tallest structures in Canada. Only one structure built since then within Canada has surpassed its height: the CN Tower in Toronto. The original mast collapsed in an ice storm in 1983 and was subsequently rebuilt in 1985.

The CKX-TV Craig broadcasting tower is currently fifth in height among the tallest structures in the Commonwealth of Nations.

CKYB-TV, a rebroadcaster of CKY-DT previously transmitted from the tower from 2009 to 2024.

== See also ==
- List of tallest structures in Canada
- List of tallest structures
