= Sundance Power Station =

Sundance Power Station A & B
- Country: Canada
- Location: Lake Wabamun, Alberta
- Coordinates: 53°30′27″N 114°33′26″W
- Status: Operational
- Commission date: 1970–1980
- Owner: TransAlta Corp.

Thermal power station
- Primary fuel: Natural Gas

Power generation
- Nameplate capacity: 1,861

Sundance Power Station is a gas-fired station (previously a coal-fired station) owned by TransAlta Corp., located 70 km west of Edmonton, Alberta, Canada on Lake Wabamun. It comprised six units (two 280 MW units and four larger units); both 280 MW units were taken out of service in mid-December 2010 and determined to be beyond economic repair. A legal battle between the owner of the PPA (TransCanada) ensued, which forced the two units to come back on line after replacement of the two boiler units. As of Dec 2013 both units had returned to production.

Units 1 and 2 operated under a 100% power purchase agreement with Alberta, known as 'Sundance A'. In August 2000 TransCanada purchased the rights to the production from Sundance A and B. Coal for the station was sourced from the TransAlta Highvale Coal Mine that is adjacent to the power station.

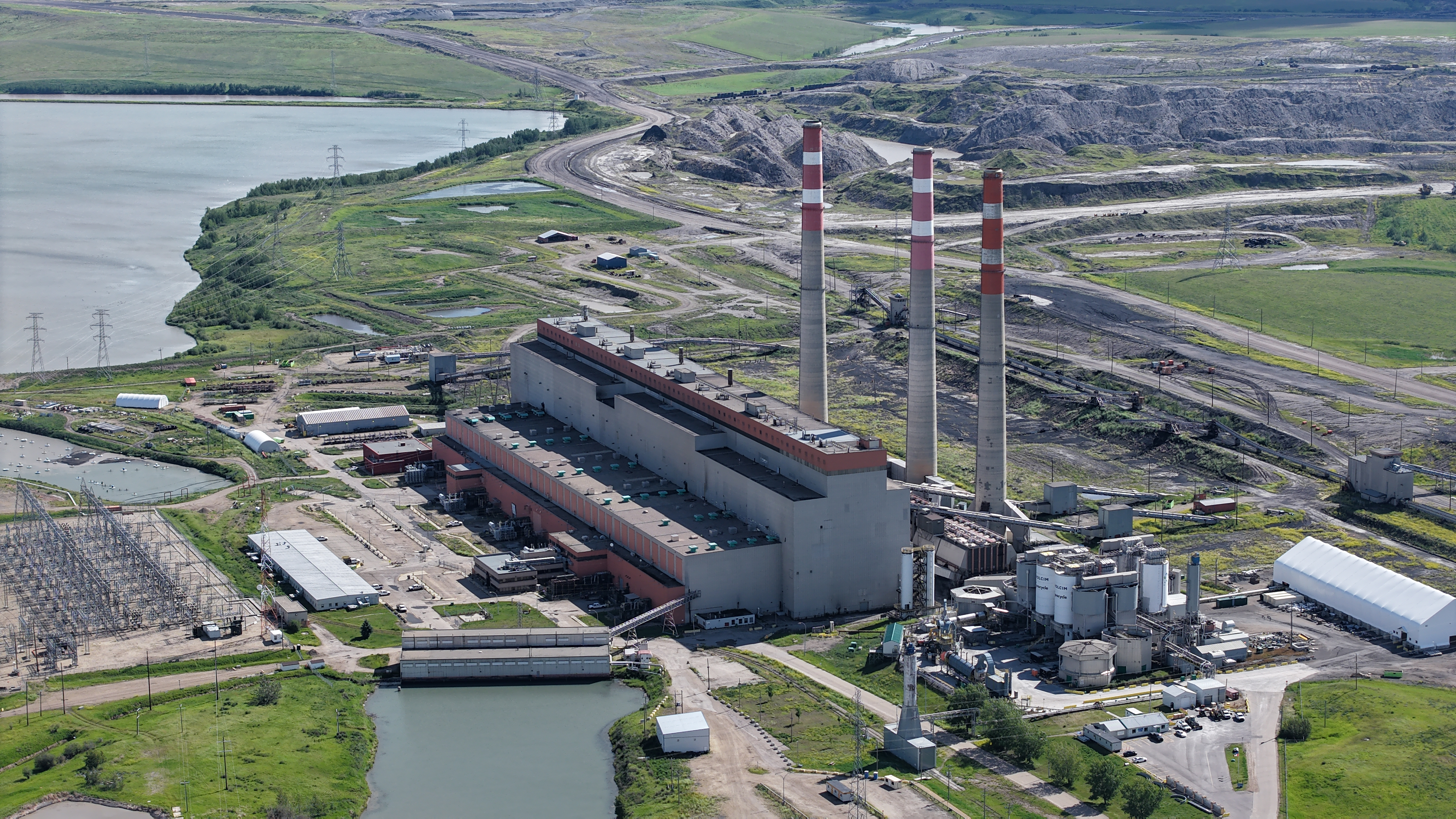
Exterior photo of Sundance Power Station, located on Wabamun Lake in Alberta.

== Description ==
The Sundance Power Station consists of six units, of which four were upgraded during the 2001-2012 period. Several units went through upgrades in 2009.

Unit commissioning dates consist of:

- Unit 1, 280 MW – 1970 (Retired January 1, 2018);
- Unit 2, 280 MW – 1973 (Retired July 31, 2018);
- Unit 3, 368 MW – 1976 (Retired July 31, 2020);
- Unit 4, 406 MW – 1977 (Converted to natural gas January 1, 2022);
- Unit 5, 406 MW – 1978 (Suspended September 28, 2021);
- Unit 6, 401 MW – 1980 (Converted to natural gas February 1, 2021);

The boilers are supplied by Combustion Engineering and the turbines/generator are supplied by AEI, GEC, or EE.

The plant features three large smokestacks each approximately 156 m (510 ft) in height.

Unit 3 has been mothballed, and was retired in 2020.

Unit 4 will be retired April 1, 2022.

== See also ==
- List of largest power stations in Canada
- List of tallest smokestacks in Canada
