= Lakeview Generating Station =

Coal-fired power station in Mississauga, Ontario, Canada

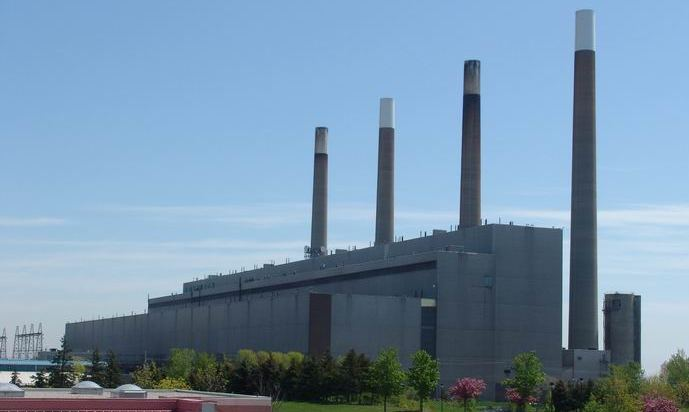
- Lakeview Generating Station
- Country: Canada
- Location: Mississauga, Ontario
- Coordinates: 43°34′16″N 79°33′6″W
- Status: Demolished
- Commission date: 1962
- Decommission date: 2005
- Owners: Ontario Hydro (before 1999); Ontario Power Generation

Thermal power station
- Primary fuel: Coal
- Turbine technology: Steam turbine

External links
- Commons: Related media on Commons

The Lakeview Generating Station was an Ontario Power Generation coal-burning power station located in Mississauga, Ontario, Canada, in the Lakeview neighbourhood on Lakeshore Road just east of Cawthra Road. The former station, constructed in 1958–1962, had four smokestacks known as the Four Sisters; the eight boilers of the generating plant all 'twinned' their emissions into common stacks. (Similar technology had been used in several of the four funnel liners that historically plied the North Atlantic Ocean.) The station was a landmark for years and was shut down in April, 2005, after 43 years of service. The four stacks, which could be seen from as far away as Burlington to the west and downtown Toronto to the east, were demolished on June 12, 2006. The rest of the building was demolished on June 28, 2007.

== History ==
During the first half of the 20th century, most electricity produced in Ontario came from hydroelectric stations. But by the early 1950s, most large hydroelectric sites were already under development and new power sources were required to meet the province's growing appetite for electricity.

On the north shore of Lake Ontario, in what was then Toronto Township, 52 hectares of land were earmarked for a new thermal-electric plant that would help meet Ontario's power demands and even provide system reserves. "The Lakeview Project" was underway by June, 1958, and quickly became a station of superlatives: its eight boilers were the largest ever installed in Canada; the 300,000 kilowatt generators the largest ever purchased by a Canadian utility; and its power transformers were the largest ever built in Canada.

On June 20, 1962, Ontario Premier John Robarts and Ontario Hydro chairman W. Ross Strike pushed the button to start up the first 300,000 kilowatt unit. Lakeview was the second thermal plant designed by Ontario Hydro. The Hearn Generating Station in Toronto opened several years before and served as a test bed for Lakeview. As the design and construction progressed, the station would include two different types of boilers and three unique turbine designs. It is possible that Ontario Hydro had a dispute with equipment suppliers in the early 1960s which caused the unusual equipment choices. The switch from Parsons as a turbine supplier to AEI was unusual since the AEI turbine generators on units 3-6 were (50 cycle) machines. They would require heavy weights attached to overcome turbine vibration at the higher (60 cycle) speeds in Canada. These were the only AEI turbines installed at Ontario Hydro. Units 5 & 6 operated until the station closed (40 years)

The station would reach 2400 MW by 1968, surpassed only by the Nanticoke Generating Station (4096 MW) near Port Dover, in the late 1970s. During the late 1960s and 1970s, the station operated to full capacity as an eight-unit baseload plant, meeting about 17% of Ontario's electricity needs. In the early 1980s, Lakeview worked at full capacity after problems at Pickering in August 1983 resulted in a brief power shortage. In the early 1990s the station was partially overhauled. A surplus of capacity led to the mothballing of four units. The station continued to play an important role as a four-unit peaking plant, providing an adequate and reliable electricity supply when consumer demands were highest in the morning and around the dinner hour – and in the summer and winter. This role was especially critical on hot days when air conditioning use drove up electricity demand.

Following provincial government policy to phase out Ontario Power Generation's six coal-fired generating stations by the end of 2007, Lakeview Generating Station ceased operations on Saturday, April 30, 2005, after 43 years.

== Boilers ==
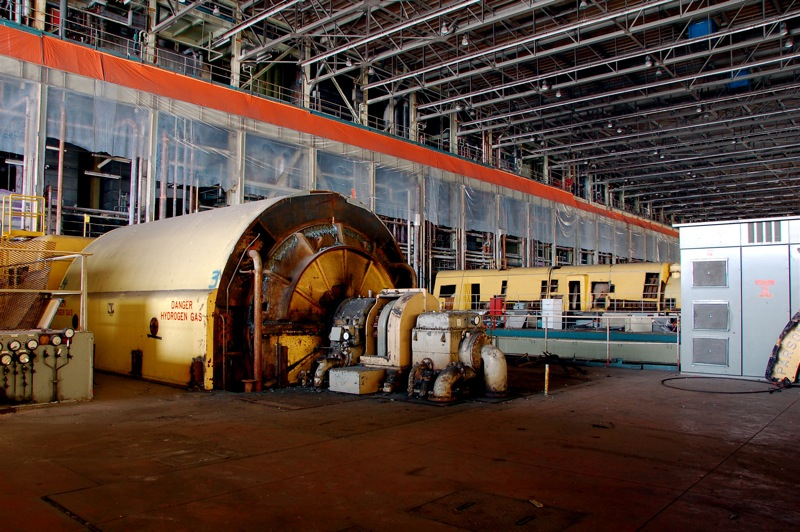
Inside the Lakeview coal-fired power plant.

Units 1 & 2 had Babcock & Wilcox front-fired boilers and Parson turbines with a tandem cross compound arrangement (there were two 150 MW turbines - high/intermediate pressure and intermediate/low pressure) Each unit had two generators - one 3600 RPM, the other 1800 RPM.

Units 3 & 4 (1964–65) had boilers built by Combustion Engineering, with double tangentially fired furnaces. The tandem compound turbines were supplied by AEI (UK)

Units 5 & 6 (1965–66) had Babcock & Wilcox front-fired boilers and AEI tandem compound turbines.

Units 7 & 8 (1968) had Babcock & Wilcox front-fired boilers and Parsons tandem compound turbines.

At a cost of $274 million, Lakeview Generating Station had become the largest thermal-electric plant in the world when it was completed in 1968.

== Environmental improvements ==
Environmental improvements at Lakeview in recent years included recycling fly ash and safeguarding water quality. The station's achievement of International Organization for Standardization ISO 14001 certification continued to demonstrate Lakeview's commitment to environmental management through responsible operation at the highest standards.

== Emissions control ==
- 1972: Research to remove SO_{2} from flue gases continues.
- 1981: Coal-cleaning project completes first of four years of testing.
- 1984: Launch of acid gas control program and commitment to cutting emissions in half by 1990.
- 1986: "War on acid gas emissions" continues as Lakeview tests limestone-injection scrubbing technology to further reduce emissions, and uses more low-sulphur coal.
- 1987: The prospect of a major equipment overhaul looms, along with new environmental restrictions. Ontario Hydro begins three-year study aimed at obtaining approval for acid gas control equipment at coal-fired generating stations.
- 1989: Hydro announces a major Lakeview rehabilitation between 1990 and 1994, including the addition of acid gas control equipment on all eight units.
- 1991: Revised plan for Lakeview includes complete rehabilitation for Units 5 and 6, and a reduced rehabilitation for Units 1 and 2; decision on remaining four units deferred.
- 1992: High-efficiency precipitators are installed on all four operating units, which combined with flue gas conditioning technology to capture more than 99% of particulates in the flue gases.
- 1999: Lakeview receives ISO 14001 accreditation and announces new initiative to further reduce nitrogen oxide (NOx) emissions.
- 2001: Lakeview completes installation of new, low nitrogen oxide burners on all operating units, cutting nitrogen oxides emissions by 50% from the 1999 level.

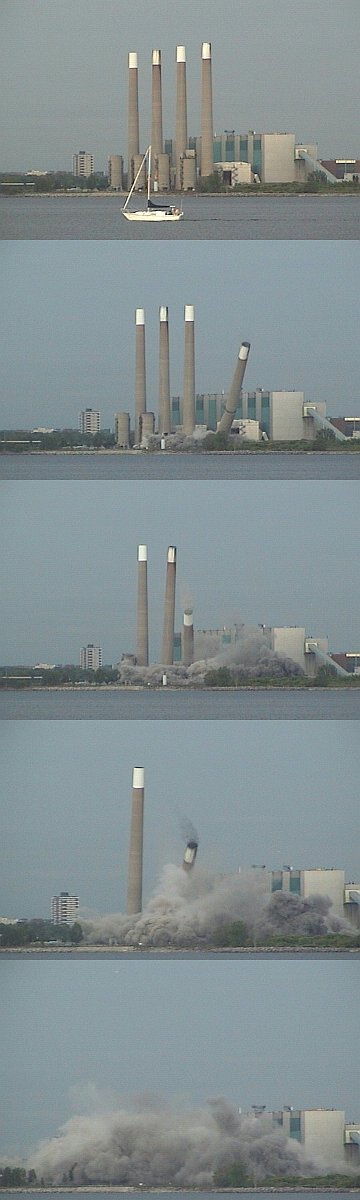
Lakeview Generating Station Demolition

== Timeline ==
- June 1, 1958: Construction begins on 52 hectares of land purchased from Toronto Township
- July 24, 1959: Ontario Hydro announces the addition of a third and fourth 300,000 kilowatt generating unit to Lakeview by 1964
- 1961: Unit 1 produces first electricity on October 30
- 1962–1965: Units 2 – 4 in service
- 1965–1969: Units 5 – 8 in service
- On the waterfront of Lake Ontario, "The Four Sisters" – Lakeview's four 146 meter (sometimes quoted as 150 meters) concrete stacks – became a familiar navigational beacon for boats, ships and airplanes.
- Lakeview ran at its highest capacity as a baseload plant from the late 1960s to the early 1980s and met about 17% of the province's energy needs. During this time, Lakeview played an important role in providing an around-the-clock, reliable supply of electricity to Ontario's energy customers.
- 1980s: In the 1980s, as nuclear units came on line at Pickering and Bruce, Lakeview's role in the electricity marketplace changed. It transitioned to a peaking plant, due to its higher costs operating only when electricity demands were highest, or other generating units were not available. In 1986, the station began to use lower-sulphur coal to reduce emissions of sulphur dioxide and nitrogen oxides.
- 1990–1993: $1.1 billion was invested in rehabilitation to increase efficiency and reliability, and the addition of acid gas control equipment to all eight units. By 1992, only four units had been overhauled when repairs were halted due to the changing future outlook and to a decline in the consumer use of energy, due to economic recession.
- 1993–2000: In January, 1993, reduced load forecasts resulted in the decommissioning of Units 3, 4, 7 and 8. In 1994, the plant returned to service as a four-unit peak-demand generating station, but with a much improved environmental performance. Lakeview continued to provide customers with a safe, reliable source of power when demand was highest, and became a key asset in times of uncertainty in the electricity marketplace. The station's location in the GTA made its output invaluable to some of Ontario's largest municipal utilities and industries –especially when nuclear and other generation was not available.
- 1998–2002: In December, 1998, Ontario Hydro announced a joint venture to pursue the development of a 550 MW natural gas-fired combined cycle power plant at Lakeview. The venture was dissolved in May, 2000. In March, 2001, the provincial government announced that Lakeview would be required to stop burning coal by April, 2005.
- 2003–2005: In October, 2003, the provincial government confirmed that Lakeview would close on April 30, 2005, with plans for the remainder of OPG's coal-fuelled plants removed from service by the end of 2007; this plan never met its deadline and only the Lakeview plant was demolished before 2008.
- June 12, 2006: "The Four Sisters" were successfully imploded by Murray Demolition LP, in order of east to west, falling to the east with a stack toppling every 4 seconds. Over a thousand spectators came to a nearby park to observe the demolition. Helicopters filled the sky, each taking footage of the event.
- June 28, 2007: The rest of the building was demolished at 11:04 am EST.

== Lakeview Village ==
The power plant lands are now vacant with plans to build residential community on the property.

North of the site was the former Lakeview Park, a sports field and home field for the Mississauga Majors Baseball Club, but has since relocated across Lakefront Promenade to Douglas Kennedy Park.

New parks such as Ogden Park, Lakefront Park and Jim Tovey Lakeview Conservation Area should added more green space.

== See also ==
List of other electricity generating facilities in the Greater Toronto Area:

- Hearn Generating Station - inactive generating station located along the lakefront in Toronto
- Portlands Energy Centre - active generating station located next to Hearn and located along the lakefront
- Pickering Nuclear Generating Station - located along the lakefront in Pickering
- Darlington Nuclear Generating Station - located along the lakefront in Clarington
- Ontario Power Generation
- List of power stations in Canada
- List of tallest smokestacks in Canada
- Tallest Destroyed/Demolished structures in Canada
- Nanticoke Generating Station
