= CHCH Television Tower =

Television tower in Stoney Creek, Ontario, Canada

Coordinates: 43°12′27.11″N 79°46′30.79″W

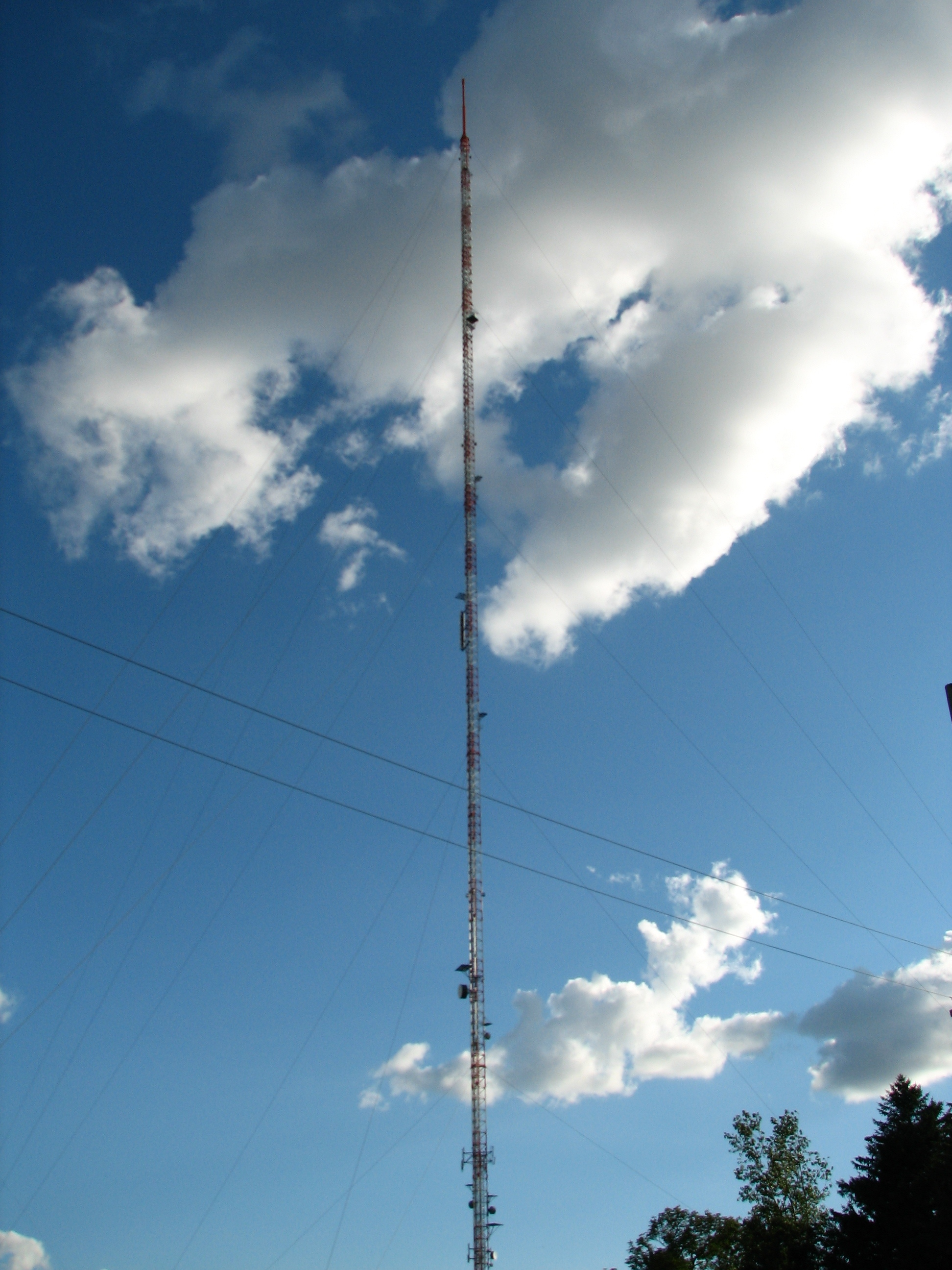
- The CHCH Television Tower viewed from the ground
- Interactive map of the CHCH Television Tower area

Record height
- Tallest in Canada from 1960 to 1965^{[I]}
- Preceded by: CKNX Television Tower
- Surpassed by: Cape Race LORAN-C transmitter

General information
- Status: Demolished
- Type: Television Mast
- Location: Stoney Creek, Ontario, 481 First Rd W, Hamilton, ON L8J 1X5, Canada
- Completed: 1960
- Relocated: 2023
- Demolished: 2024

Height
- Height: 357.5 metres (1,173 ft)

Technical details
- Structural system: Guy-Wire

The CHCH Television Tower was a 357.5 metre 1,173 feet-high guyed TV mast located at 481 First Road West in Stoney Creek, Ontario, Canada. The tower housed the primary transmitter for the independent television station CHCH-DT as well as that of CITS-DT, the flagship of the religious Yes TV television system. The tower also housed the transmitter for CING-FM. It was the fourth-tallest structure in Canada while standing.

When completed in 1960, the CHCH Television Tower became the tallest structure in Canada. Only five structures built since then have surpassed its height: the CN Tower in Toronto (completed in 1976), the Cape Race LORAN-C transmitter (completed in 1963, collapsed in 1993), the Inco Superstack in Sudbury (completed in 1971) and the original and replacement guyed mast(s) of the CKX-TV Tower (completed in 1973, collapsed in 1983, rebuilt in 1985). The CHCH tower ranked thirteenth in height among the tallest structures in the Commonwealth of Nations.

The mast was located on the edge of the Niagara Escarpment, so when viewed from the bottom of the escarpment with an elevation some 100+ metres or 300+ feet lower, it appeared exceptionally tall.

In November 2023, the tower began being dismantled by the use of a gin pole since the property was sold to a land developer. CHCH erected a new tower in Flamborough which began construction in early summer 2023 and became operational in late November of that same year. The new transmitter is located on Hwy 5 near Millgrove Side Road. The new tower is 304.8 metres or 1,000 feet tall.

Early morning on March 13, 2024, the entire remaining half of the tower was demolished while the first half was removed via gin pole. Due to the height of the tower and surrounding housing development, the entire structure could not be demolished all at once.

== Images ==
A guy-wire anchor to the right.

Upper portion of the mast, and guy wires.

Pinnacle of the mast.

Base and surrounding environment of the tower.

The tower viewed from a distance of about one mile.

A detailed view of the guy wires and top part of the mast.

A terrestrial antenna on the tower.

== See also ==
- List of tallest structures in Canada
- List of masts
