= CBC Jarvis Street Tower =

Former transmission tower in Toronto, Canada

- Interactive map of the CBC Jarvis Street Tower area

General information
- Status: Dismantled
- Type: lattice tower
- Location: Toronto, Ontario, Canada
- Coordinates: 43°39′49.24″N 79°22′41.11″W
- Completed: 1952
- Destroyed: 2002

Height
- Height: 160m (540 ft)

The CBC Jarvis Street Tower was a 160 m (540 ft) free-standing lattice tower built in 1952 to provide radio transmission facilities to the city of Toronto, Ontario, Canada. It was the second tallest freestanding structure in Canada for several years and the second tallest freestanding lattice tower ever built in Canada after the Cambridge Bay LORAN Tower. In addition it was tallest structure in Toronto for 15 years until the completion of the TD Tower in 1967. Owned by the Canadian Broadcasting Corporation, the tower was located at 345 Jarvis Street in the Church and Wellesley neighbourhood of Toronto.

The tower was used by CBC stations CBL-FM, CBLT and CBLFT, as well as CJRT and CICA-TV, until 1976, when almost all broadcast signals in Toronto moved to the CN Tower.

The adjacent studio complex was used for CBC Toronto's radio and television operations, including CBL, which only used the studios at Jarvis Street, broadcasting from its transmitter at Hornby. After the Jarvis Street transmitter was made redundant by the CN Tower, the CBC continued to use the studio facilities at that site until moving to the Canadian Broadcasting Centre in 1992.

The tower was painted red and white as warning for aircraft as part of the requirement to warn aircraft flying near it.

The tower itself remained standing until 2002 when it was demolished to make way for the Radio City condo development.

== See also ==
- List of tallest structures in Canada
