= Cape Race LORAN-C transmitter =

Canadian radio transmitter in Newfoundland and Labrador

Cape Race LORAN-C Mast (1st)

- Location within Newfoundland

Record height
- Tallest in Canada from 1965 to 1976^{[I]}
- Preceded by: CHCH Television Tower
- Surpassed by: CN Tower

General information
- Status: Destroyed
- Type: Mast radiator insulated against ground
- Location: Cape Race, Newfoundland and Labrador, Canada
- Coordinates: 46°46′32.58″N 53°10′27.65″W
- Completed: 1965
- Destroyed: 2 February 1993

Height
- Height: 411.48 m (1,350.00 ft)

Design and construction
- Main contractor: US Coast Guard

Cape Race LORAN-C Mast (2nd)
- Interactive map of the Cape Race LORAN-C Mast (2nd) area

General information
- Status: Demolished
- Type: Mast radiator insulated against ground
- Location: Cape Race, Newfoundland and Labrador, Canada
- Coordinates: 46°46′32.58″N 53°10′27.65″W
- Completed: 1993
- Destroyed: 20 October 2012

Height
- Height: 260.3 m (854.00 ft)

Design and construction
- Main contractor: US Coast Guard

The Cape Race LORAN-C transmitter was a LORAN-C transmitter at Cape Race, Newfoundland and Labrador, Canada.

The Cape Race LORAN-C transmitter was used as an antenna tower until February 2, 1993. It was a 411.48 m (1350 ft) tall guyed mast, built in 1965. This mast was the tallest structure in Canada until the construction of the CN Tower in Toronto, and remained the second-tallest structure until its collapse on February 2, 1993. The CKX TV-Craig broadcast tower at Hayfield, Manitoba equalled this tower in height when it was erected in 1973.

The collapse was the result of a fatigue failure of the eyebolt head in a compression cone insulator on a structural guy-wire. This failure caused swing-in damage that resulted in the tower's collapse. The tower was replaced by a 260.3 meter (854 ft) tall guyed mast, insulated against the ground.

The Cape Race LORAN-C transmitter was used until 1993 as part of the LORAN-C Chain GRI 9930 and worked with a transmission power of 1800 kilowatts. The Cape Race LORAN-C transmitter acted as the Yankee Secondary Transmitter of the Canadian East Coast LORAN-C chain (GRI 5930) and as the Whiskey Secondary of the Newfoundland East Coast LORAN-C chain (GRI 7270).

The transmission power for the Canadian East Coast LORAN-C chain was 1000 kW, and for the Newfoundland East Coast LORAN-C the transmission power was 500 kW. The mast has been demolished.

== See also ==
- List of masts
- List of tallest buildings and structures in Canada
