= Cambridge Bay LORAN Tower =

Tower in Nunavut, Canada

Coordinates: 69°06′53″N 105°00′56″W

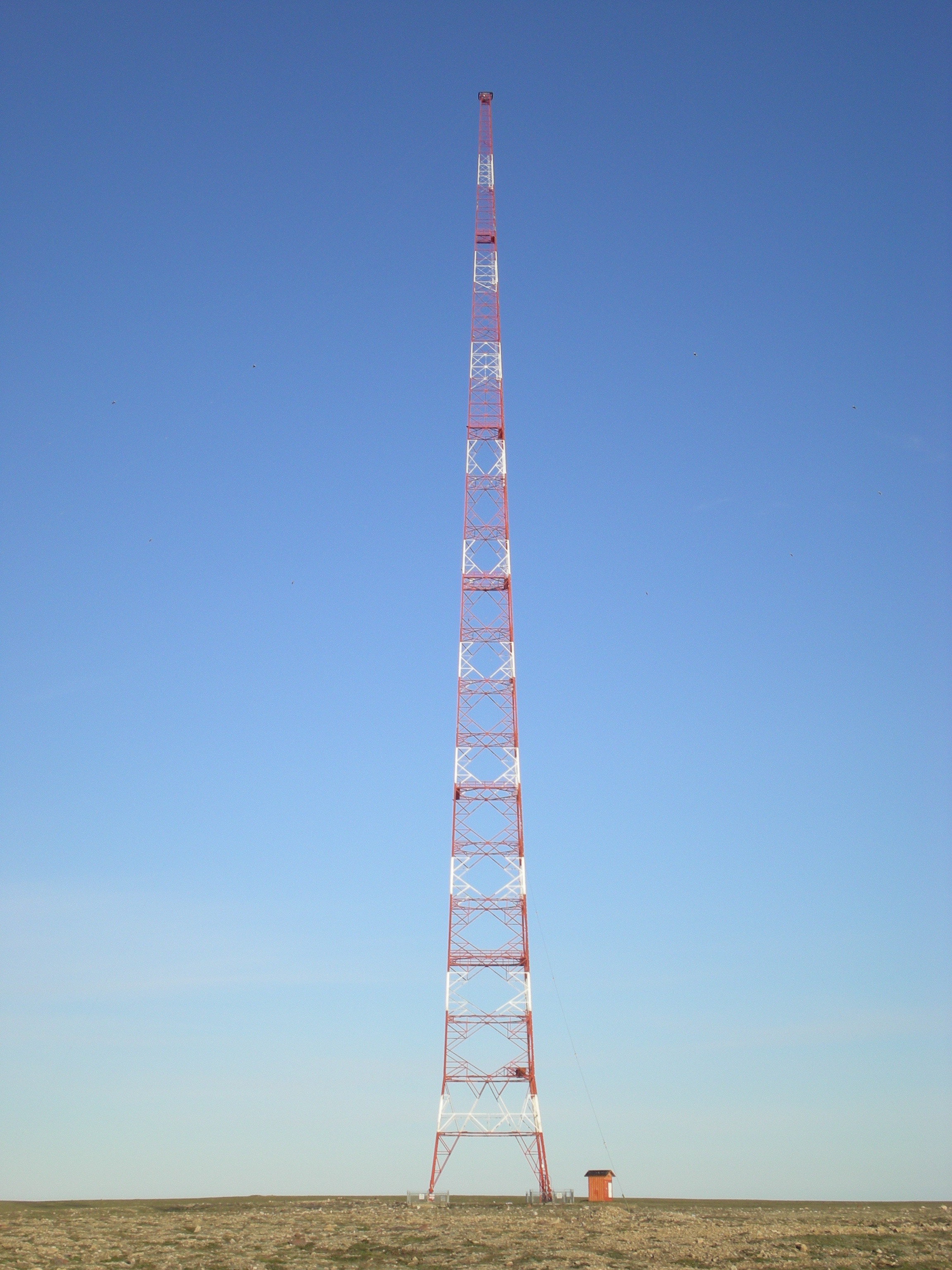
CB NDB

Cambridge Bay LORAN Tower was a 189 m (620 ft) tall free-standing lattice tower at Cambridge Bay, Nunavut, Canada. It was built in 1947/48 for LORAN transmissions and was the tallest freestanding structure in Canada for several years. Later the tower was used as a non-directional beacon (NDB) and was often called the "CB" beacon after the morse code letters that it transmitted on 245 kHz, with an output power of 2000 watts. What appeared to be guy-wires on the tower were "top loading" forming part of the antenna. The tower was four sided and the base 18 m (59 ft) per side or 324 m^{2} (3,490 sq ft).

The tower, built in 1947, became redundant with the construction of the Distant Early Warning Line in the 1950s.

In 2013, the tower was determined to be structurally unsound and scheduled for demolition, to be replaced by a 160 ft (49 m) tower. The removal, which was supposed to have been completed in October 2013, didn't begin until the evening of 4 August 2014 and was completed on 5 August 2014.

== See also ==
- List of towers
