= Cape Race =

Cape in Newfoundland and Labrador, Canada

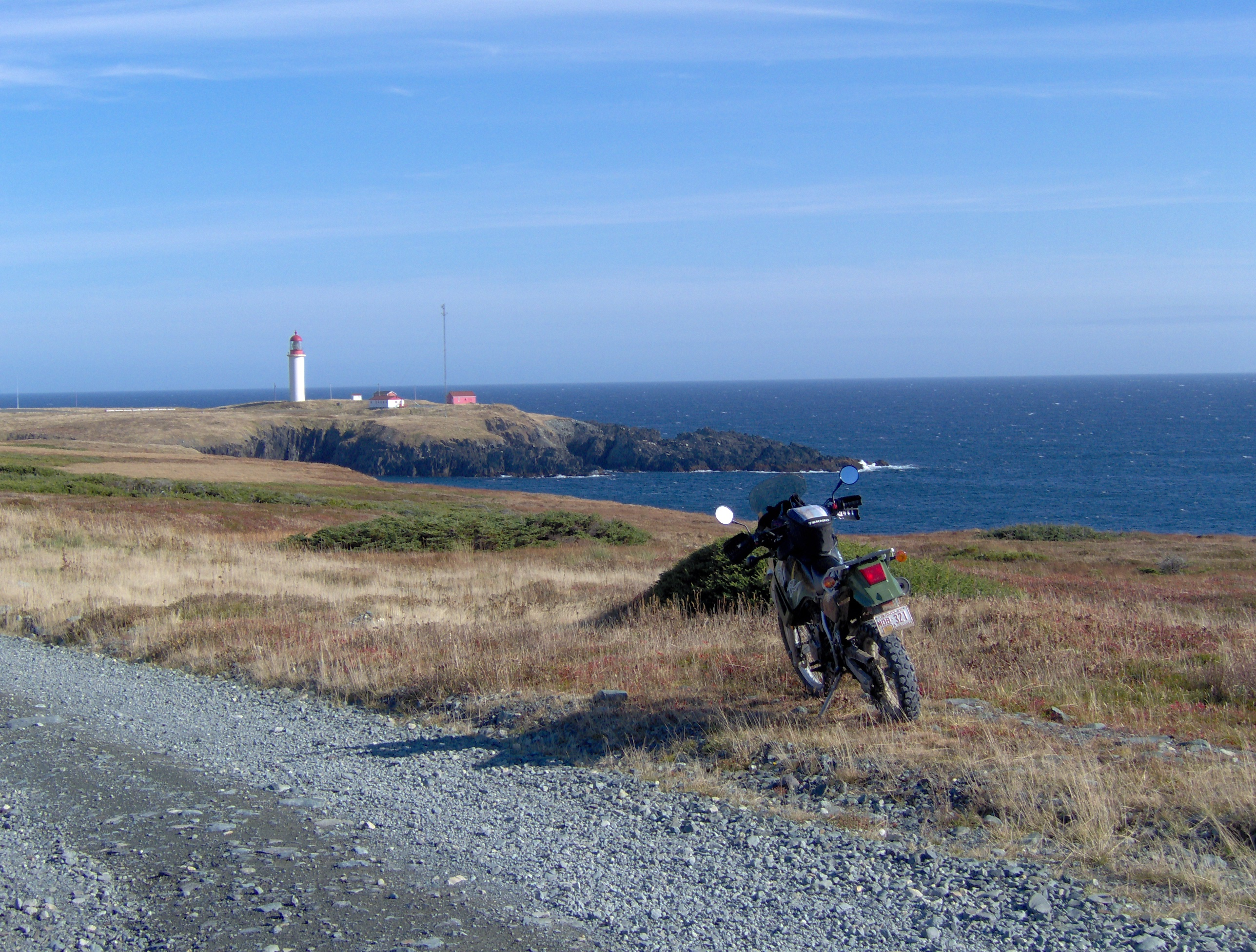
Cape Race

Location of Cape Race in Newfoundland

Cape Race is a point of land located at the southeastern tip of the Avalon Peninsula on the island of Newfoundland, in Newfoundland and Labrador, Canada. Its name is thought to come from the original Portuguese name for this cape, "Raso", meaning flat or low-lying. The Cape appeared on early sixteenth century maps as Cabo Raso and its name may derive from a cape of the same name at the mouth of the Tagus River in Portugal. The cape was the location of the Cape Race LORAN-C transmitter until the system was decommissioned in 2010. It is also home to the Cape Race Lighthouse, notable for having received the distress call from the RMS Titanic.

== Geography ==
Dense fog, rocky coasts, and its proximity to trans-Atlantic shipping routes have resulted in many shipwrecks near Cape Race over the years. One of the most famous was the SS Arctic. Cape Race is a flat, barren point of land jutting out into the Atlantic Ocean, its cliffs rising almost vertically to 30.5 metres (100 ft) above sea level. On average it is shrouded in fog on 158 days of the year.

=== Climate ===
Climate data for Cape Race Climate ID: 8401000; WMO ID: 71800; coordinates 46°39′36″N 53°04′35″W; elevation: 26.5 m (87 ft); 1991–2020 normals, extremes 1982–present
Month	Jan	Feb	Mar	Apr	May	Jun	Jul	Aug	Sep	Oct	Nov	Dec	Year
Record high °C (°F)	10.6 (51.1)	9.4 (48.9)	11.4 (52.5)	18.9 (66.0)	20.8 (69.4)	25.6 (78.1)	27.8 (82.0)	27.8 (82.0)	28.2 (82.8)	22.2 (72.0)	16.9 (62.4)	12.2 (54.0)	28.2 (82.8)
Mean daily maximum °C (°F)	1.0 (33.8)	0.3 (32.5)	1.4 (34.5)	4.4 (39.9)	7.8 (46.0)	11.8 (53.2)	16.2 (61.2)	18.0 (64.4)	15.7 (60.3)	11.5 (52.7)	7.5 (45.5)	3.4 (38.1)	8.3 (46.9)
Daily mean °C (°F)	−2.5 (27.5)	−3.0 (26.6)	−1.8 (28.8)	1.4 (34.5)	4.6 (40.3)	8.4 (47.1)	12.9 (55.2)	14.9 (58.8)	12.3 (54.1)	8.3 (46.9)	4.3 (39.7)	0.2 (32.4)	5.0 (41.0)
Mean daily minimum °C (°F)	−6.0 (21.2)	−6.3 (20.7)	−4.9 (23.2)	−1.6 (29.1)	1.3 (34.3)	5.0 (41.0)	9.5 (49.1)	11.7 (53.1)	8.9 (48.0)	5.0 (41.0)	1.0 (33.8)	−3.1 (26.4)	1.7 (35.1)
Record low °C (°F)	−24.4 (−11.9)	−26.1 (−15.0)	−21.0 (−5.8)	−15.0 (5.0)	−9.4 (15.1)	−6.1 (21.0)	−1.1 (30.0)	0.6 (33.1)	−3.3 (26.1)	−10.0 (14.0)	−13.9 (7.0)	−21.1 (−6.0)	−26.1 (−15.0)
Average precipitation mm (inches)	98.9 (3.89)	87.3 (3.44)	93.1 (3.67)	98.9 (3.89)	83.7 (3.30)	84.0 (3.31)	116.4 (4.58)	99.5 (3.92)	95.0 (3.74)	109.7 (4.32)	137.6 (5.42)	111.1 (4.37)	1,215.2 (47.84)
Source 1: Environment Canada
Source 2: Meteostat

== History ==
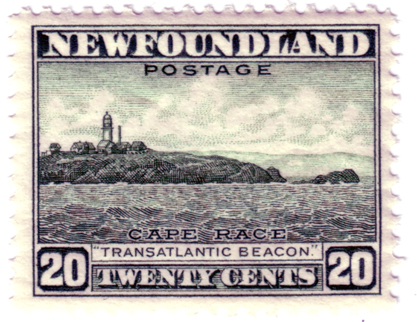
Postage stamp (1947) of Cape Race, Newfoundland

In 1583, having claimed the port of St John's for Queen Elizabeth I, Sir Humphrey Gilbert, on board the ship Squirrel, and accompanied by the ships Golden Hind and Delight, passed by Cape Race on his way back to England. Squirrel would sink en route, taking Gilbert with her.

From 1859 to 1866, the Associated Press kept a newsboat at Cape Race to meet ocean liners passing by on their way from Europe so that news could be telegraphed to New York City. These news items carried the byline "via Cape Race". In 1904, the first Wireless station in Newfoundland was built at Cape Race. On the night Titanic sank, wireless operator Jack Phillips was sending telegraphs to Cape Race for relay to New York City. When Cyril Evans, wireless operator of the Leyland Line SS Californian, informed to the RMS Titanic, only a few miles away, that the ship had stopped for the night and was surrounded by icy water. Phillips responded "DDD," meaning that he was transmitting to the Cape Race Marconi Station and to "stop transmitting" as he could not hear the faint signals from Cape Race due to Californian's stronger signal.

Evans soon switched off the wireless and went to sleep at a normal time. Only fifteen minutes later, Titanic hit an iceberg. Cape Race was also the last land station to pick up Titanic's distress calls. Contrary to belief, Evans was not offended and Titanic's bridge was already aware of ice in the area due to previous ice warnings from other ships. After Titanic's distress call, Cape Race played a major role in relaying news of the sinking to other ships and land locations.

On September 11, 1990, a Boeing 727 trijet went missing off the coast of Cape Race with 16 people on board. The aircraft was never found.

Marconi's station (MCE) was rebuilt on the same site and opened as a "wireless interpretation centre" to commemorate the 100th anniversary of Titanic's sinking in 2012.
