= Tufts Cove Generating Station =

Power station in Canada

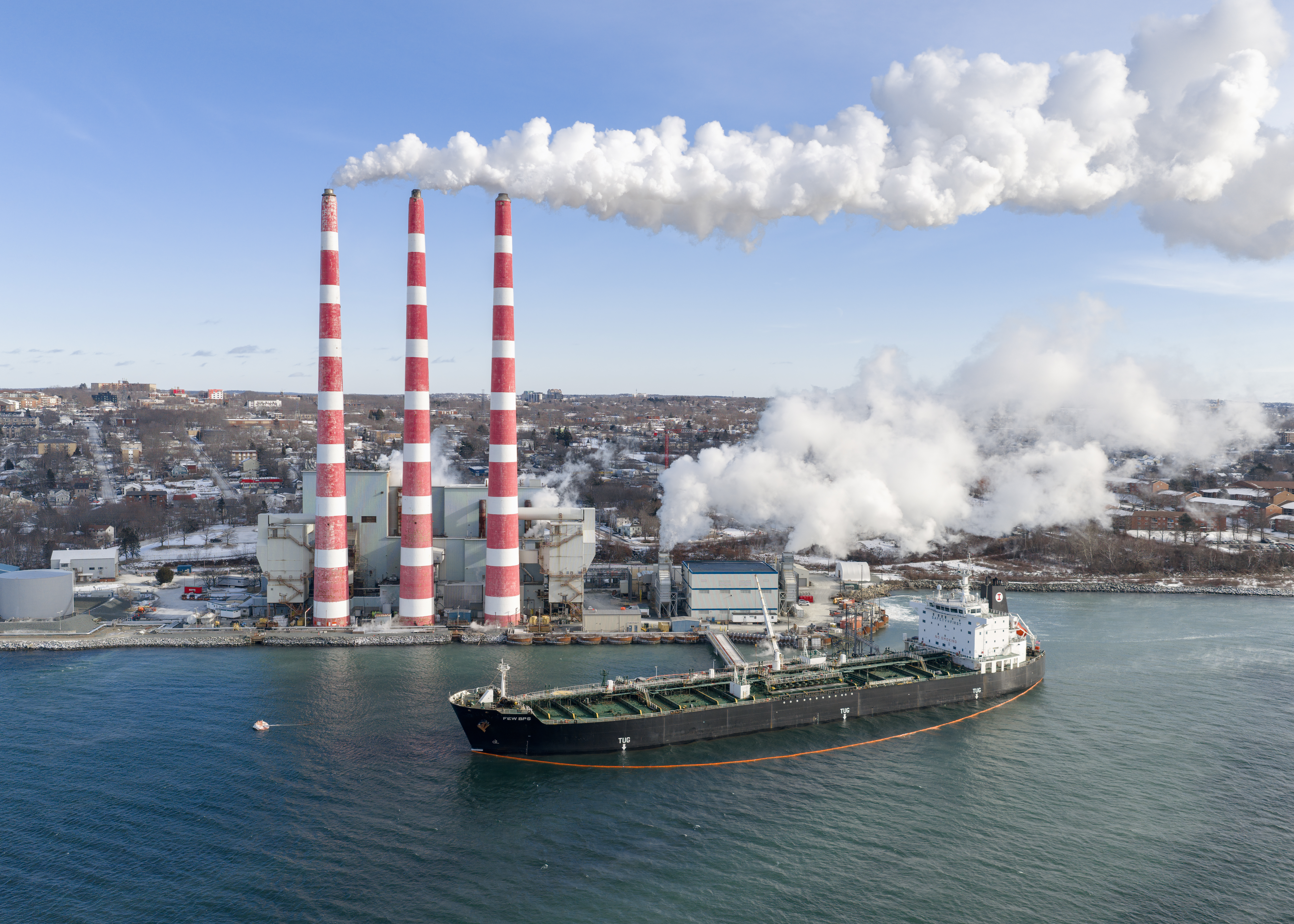
- Oil tanker delivering fuel to the station
- Tufts Cove Generating Station, Nova Scotia
- Country: Canada
- Location: Tufts Cove, Nova Scotia
- Coordinates: 44.6766°N 63.5960°W
- Status: Operational
- Commission date: 1965
- Owner: Nova Scotia Power

Thermal power station
- Primary fuel: Fuel oil (converted from Coal)
- Secondary fuel: Natural gas

Power generation
- Nameplate capacity: 500 MW

External links
- Commons: Related media on Commons

Tufts Cove Generating Station is a Canadian electrical generating station located in the Dartmouth neighbourhood of Tufts Cove in Nova Scotia's Halifax Regional Municipality. The station is owned and operated by Nova Scotia Power.

The station was constructed in 1965 by Nova Scotia Light and Power on the eastern shore of Halifax Harbour and was developed as a replacement for the former Water Street Generating Station, which had been commissioned in 1902. The original development included three steam generating units (Units 1–3), commissioned between 1965 and 1976. Unit 1 was initially designed to burn both heavy fuel oil and coal mined by the Cape Breton Development Corporation. It was later modified to fire oil only when Unit 2 entered service, while Unit 3 was commissioned in 1976 as an oil-fired unit.

The station was later modified to permit the use of natural gas in addition to fuel oil. Emissions-control equipment, including electrostatic precipitators, was installed on the older units. In the early 2000s, two simple-cycle natural gas combustion turbine units (Units 4 and 5) were added, each rated at 47.3 MW. A combined-cycle waste heat recovery unit (Unit 6) was later constructed to capture exhaust heat from the combustion turbines, producing approximately 50 MW of additional generating capacity.

The Halifax lateral of the Maritimes and Northeast Pipeline was approved by the Province of Nova Scotia in 1999 to connect the main pipeline system to the Tufts Cove site, supplying natural gas directly to the station.

On February 14, 2021 5 workers were sent to hospital after a fire broke out in a potash container.

== Cultural reference ==
The stacks of the Tufts Cove Generating Station are often visible in the background of outdoor location shots in the Canadian TV comedy series Trailer Park Boys.

== See also ==
- List of power stations in Canada
- List of tallest smokestacks in Canada
