= Lambton Generating Station =

Decommissioned coal-fired power station in Lambton County, Ontario

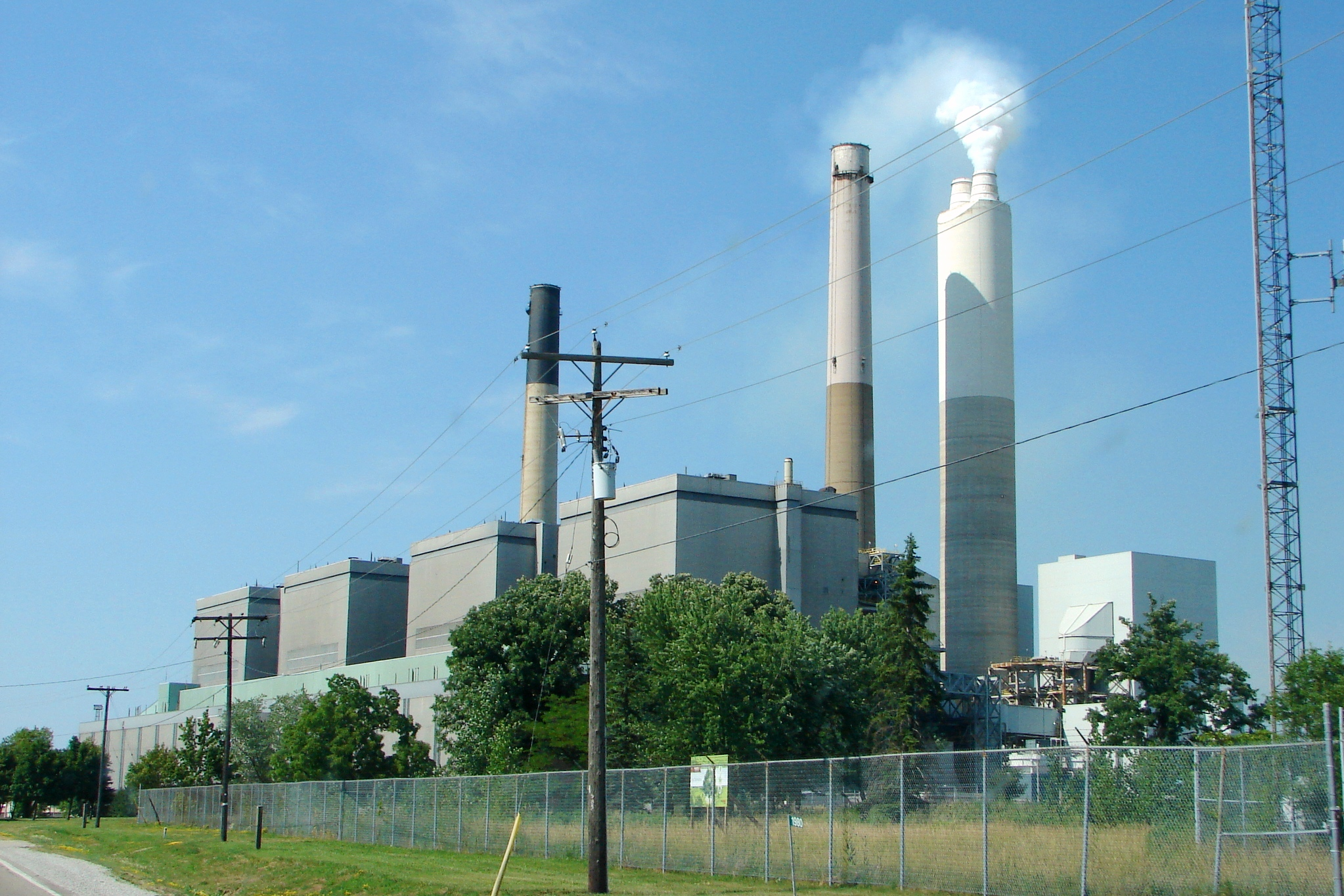
- Country: Canada
- Location: Corunna, Ontario
- Coordinates: 42°47′50″N 82°28′10″W
- Status: Permanent shutdown
- Commission date: 1969
- Decommission date: Shutdown in September 2013
- Owner: Ontario Power Generation

Thermal power station
- Primary fuel: Coal
- Turbine technology: Steam turbine

Power generation
- Nameplate capacity: 950 megawatts

The Lambton Generating Station was a coal-fuelled power plant located on the St. Clair River near Corunna, Ontario, delivering up to 950 MW of power to the grid. It is owned by Ontario Power Generation.

The plant previously had a total generating capacity of 1,976 MW, prior to the permanent shutdown of generating units 1 and 2 (of four) in October 2010. The remaining units were shut down in September 2013. It was connected to the power grid via numerous 230 kV lines, and also had two interconnections with Detroit Edison and ITC Transmission via a 230 kV line (Lambton-St. Clair #1) and a 345 kV line (Lambton-St. Clair #2). It is located almost exactly across the St. Clair River from Detroit Edison's St. Clair Power Plant in East China, Michigan.

The facility had three 168-metre (551 ft) smokestacks, one of which was equipped with flue-gas desulfurization units, commonly called "scrubbers", to remove sulfur oxide. Emissions from scrubbers at the Lambton station could be seen for over 16 km, although with the scrubbers operating properly, these plumes likely had over 90% less SO_{2} compared with other coal-fired stations without scrubbers.

On November 22, 2016, it was announced that Ontario Power Generation was no longer looking at alternative uses for Lambton Generating Station, and that the facility would be decommissioned in 2017. It was definitively closed in 2020. Demolition work is in progress and should last 2 years.

On February 12, 2022, the majority of buildings at Lambton Generating Station, including the three large stacks, were imploded.

== Emissions ==
Greenhouse Gases (2012)
Greenhouse gas	Sum (tonnes)	Sum (tonnes CO_{2}e*)
CO_{2}	2,238,606.72	2,238,607
CH_{4}	46.08	968
N_{2}O	27.05	8,387
HFCs	0.00	2
SF_{6}	0.00	84
Total	-	2,248,047

*Calculated figures for CO_{2}e are rounded to the nearest tonne.

Total emissions, 2004–2012
Year	Emissions (tonnes CO_{2}e)
2004	7,208,141
2005	8,738,072
2006	6,485,627
2007	8,501,943
2008	6,405,366
2009	3,782,065
2010	3,330,461
2011	1,265,653
2012	2,248,047

== Redevelopment ==
In 2012, plans were announced to relocate a proposed natural gas-powered generating station, originally intended for construction by Greenfield South Power Corporation in Mississauga, near to Etobicoke's Sherway Gardens, to the Lambton Generating Station site.

Construction in Mississauga had already begun in 2011; the original site selection was cancelled during the October 2011 provincial election with the project becoming a key issue during that campaign and the subsequent 2014 campaign.

== See also ==
- List of electrical generating stations in Ontario
- List of electrical generating stations in Canada
- Science and technology in Canada
- List of tallest smokestacks in Canada
