= CBC Tower (Mont-Carmel) =

Tower in Quebec, Canada

CBC Tower (Mont-Carmel) (1st)
- Interactive map of the CBC Tower (Mont-Carmel) (1st) area

General information
- Status: Destroyed
- Type: TV Mast
- Location: Notre-Dame-du-Mont-Carmel, Quebec, Canada
- Coordinates: 46°29′33.26″N 72°39′5.63″W
- Completed: 1972
- Destroyed: 2001

Height
- Height: 331.4 m (1,087.27 ft)

The CBC Tower, also known as the WesTower Transmission Tower, was a 331.4-metre-high (1,087 ft) guyed mast (now 326.7-metre-high (1,072 ft) after its reconstruction) for FM and TV transmission located atop Mont-Carmel near Shawinigan, Quebec, Canada. The tower was built in 1972 and it served for several decades as Quebec's primary CBC transmission point and also served several radio and television stations for the Trois-Rivières market. In 2001, the tower was destroyed in a tragic but bizarre set of circumstances when a single-prop plane crashed into the tower necessitating its demolition and reconstruction. At the time it was the tallest known explosives demolition of a structure in recorded history.

== Crash and rebuild ==
On 22 April 2001 a lone pilot, Gilbert Paquette, accidentally flew his Cessna 150 directly into the tower, killing him. The crash was unusual as Paquette was on a regular routine flight he had flown many times before, and there were no other natural or man-made structure of this height within a thousand mile radius making it extremely unlikely. It was later thought he was using the tower as a way point, flying straight for it, but he lost visual contact in fog and misjudged his instrument position due to a tailwind. The strike on the tower was so severe it knocked the whole thing several metres off balance. Light debris rained down, but local townspeople and investigators were puzzled they could not find the bulk of the plane's wreckage. Someone looked up and realized the fuselage, with Paquette's body still inside, was actually impaled in the uppermost part of the tower. A local coroner was flown up by helicopter to visually confirm Paquette was deceased. His family requested the plane remain in place and to let his body fall naturally, "like an apple from a tree", although local residents in the fall zone of the tower opposed this idea.

It was decided that due to the structural damage and the need to recover Paquette body, the mast would have to be demolished. Experts from the United States were brought in and several days later a controlled implosion successfully and safely collapsed the tower onto itself. The aircraft wreckage and pilot's body survived the demolition fully intact. At the time, it was the tallest structure to have ever been demolished with explosives.

In July 2003 a new mast was built on the same spot using the same base. It broadcasts at over double the radiated power of the original - from 4,386 watts to 9,300 watts. The main tower height is the same as the original at 307-metre-high (1,007 ft). The antenna on the top was originally 24.4-metre-high (80 ft) and is now a few feet shorter at 19.7-metre-high (65 ft).

== See also ==
- List of masts
