= Lorneville, New Brunswick =

Community in New Brunswick, Canada

Coordinates: 45°10′59″N 66°09′20″W

Lorneville, formerly the Village of Pisarinco (1854–1902), is a small Canadian coastal community located in the western part of Saint John County, New Brunswick.

It was named to honour the Marquess of Lorne, who served as Governor General of Canada from 1878 to 1883. With an estimated population of 800 (2006), it sits along the Bay of Fundy and has been part of the city of Saint John since the 1967 amalgamation.

== History ==
In July 2024, the City of Saint John announced plans to expand the Spruce Lake Industrial Park.

== See also ==
- List of neighbourhoods in New Brunswick
- Royal eponyms in Canada
