= The Amazing Race Canada 4 =

Season of television series

- Season 4
- Presented by: Jon Montgomery
- No. of teams: 10
- Winners: Stephanie LeClair & Kristen McKenzie
- No. of legs: 11
- Distance traveled: 25,000 km (16,000 mi)
- No. of episodes: 11 (13 including recap & reunion)

Release
- Original network: CTV
- Original release: June 28 – September 13, 2016

Additional information
- Filming dates: April 28 – May 24, 2016

Series chronology
- ← Previous; Season 3 Next → Season 5

The Amazing Race Canada 4 is the fourth season of The Amazing Race Canada, a Canadian reality competition show based on the American series The Amazing Race. Hosted by Jon Montgomery, it featured ten teams of two, each with a pre-existing relationship, in a race across Canada and the world. The grand prize included a CA$250,000 cash payout, a trip for two around the world, and the choice of any two Chevrolet vehicles driven during the season. This season visited six provinces, one territory, and two additional countries and travelled over 25,000 kilometres (16,000 mi) during eleven legs. Starting in Yellowknife, racers travelled through the Northwest Territories, Alberta, Vietnam, British Columbia, Ontario, Cuba, Nova Scotia, New Brunswick, and Quebec before finishing in Montreal. The season premiere aired on CTV on June 28, 2016, with the finale airing on September 13, 2016.

Dating couple Stephanie "Steph" LeClair and Kristen McKenzie were the winners of this season and became the first all-female team to win the Canadian edition of the show, while exes Jillian McLaughlin and Emmett Blois from Big Brother Canada 1 finished in second place, and father and daughter Joel Ground and Ashley Callingbull-Burnham finished in third place.

== Production ==
=== Development and filming ===
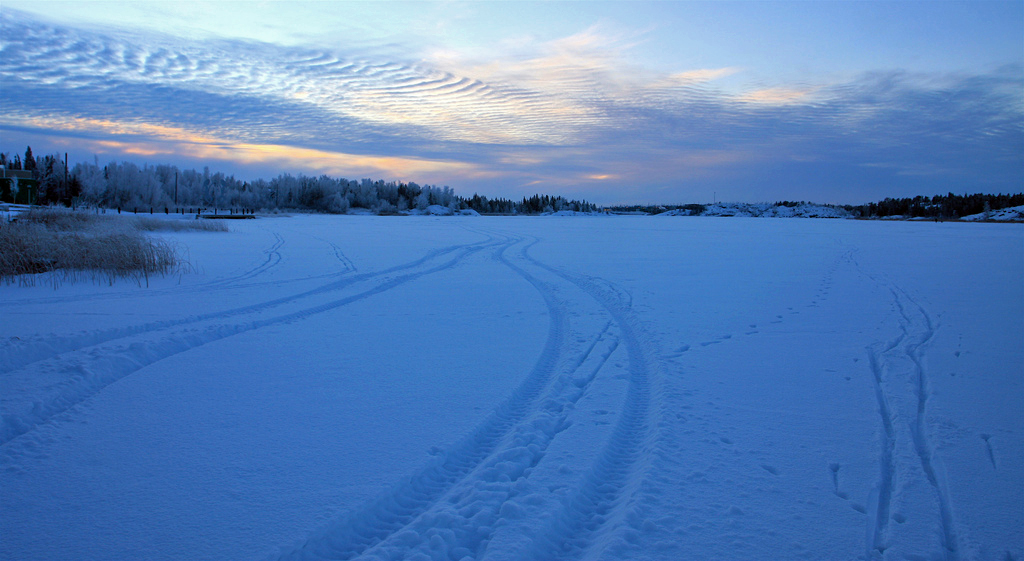
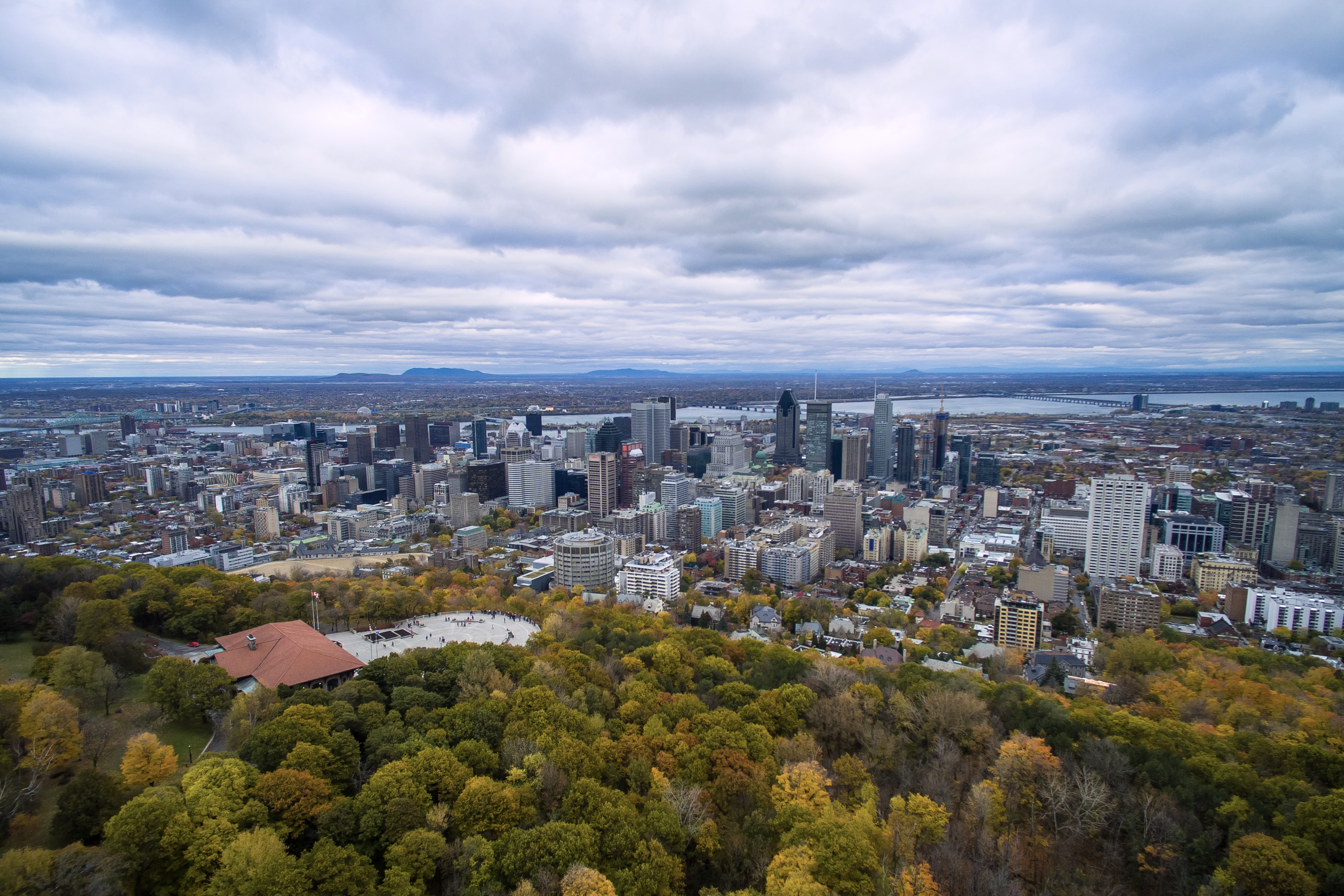
The fourth Canadian Amazing Race was started on an ice-covered Frame Lake in Yellowknife (top) and ended on top of Mount Royal overlooking a scenic view of Montreal (bottom).

On September 21, 2015, CTV announced that the show was renewed for a fourth season.

Filming of the show was reported in Yellowknife, in the Northwest Territories, at the Legislative Assembly building, on Frame Lake close to the Prince of Wales Northern Heritage Centre, and at the ceremonial circle near the Royal Canadian Mounted Police "G" Division headquarters downtown. On May 10, host Jon Montgomery was spotted near a clue box at Prince Rupert City Hall in British Columbia. Teams were reported racing near Kingston Penitentiary in Kingston, Ontario, on May 14, where a U-Turn board was also seen.

=== Casting ===
Casting began on September 23, 2015, and as in the previous three seasons, an online site was used for submission of applications and audition videos. Casting closed on November 23, 2015.

=== Programming ===
A half-hour special episode titled The Amazing Race Canada: Top 20 Moments, reviewing the events of the first seven episodes, aired in place of a regular episode on August 16, with regular episodes resuming the following week. Similar to previous seasons, a special season-end reunion/recap again titled After the Race, this time hosted by the cast of The Social, aired immediately after the season finale to review the season as a whole.

=== Marketing ===
Petro-Canada and trip sponsor Air Canada discontinued their sponsorship, Chevrolet continued sponsoring the show along with previous seasons' sponsors Bank of Montreal (BMO) and Mentos. New sponsors for this season were outerwear sponsor Mountain Equipment Co-op and trip sponsor Hotels.com.

== Cast ==
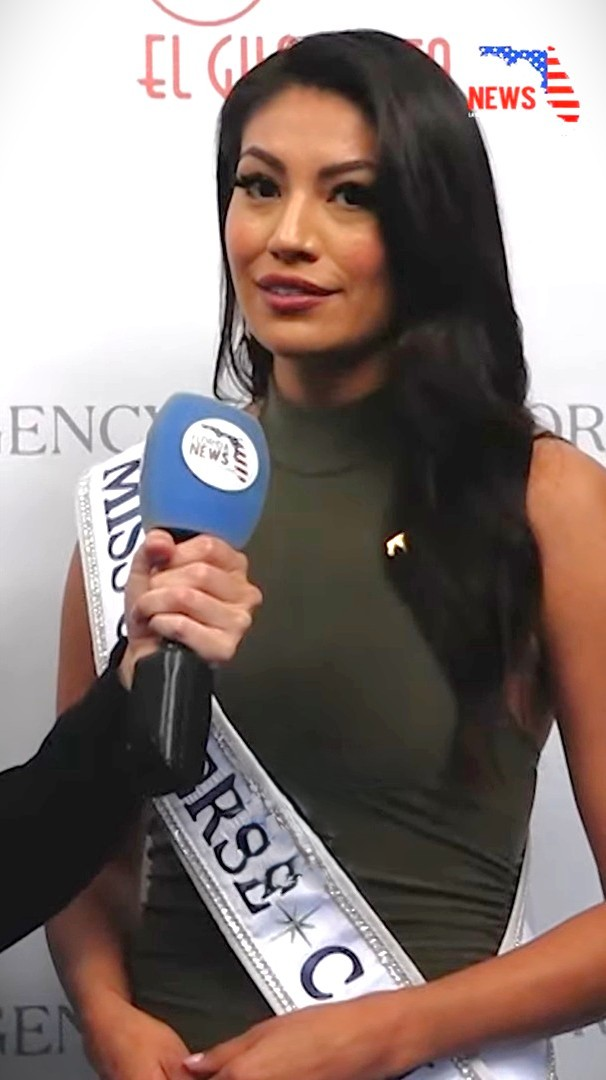
Ashley Callingbull-Burnham

The cast includes actress and Mrs. Universe 2015 winner Ashley Callingbull-Burnham, and Big Brother Canada 1 HouseGuests Jillian MacLaughlin and Emmett Blois. Lowell Taylor is the first legally blind contestant in any edition of The Amazing Race.

| Contestants | Age | Relationship | Hometown | Status |
|---|---|---|---|---|
| Anthony Libombe | 21 | Best Friends | Windsor, Ontario | Eliminated 1st (in Jasper National Park, Alberta) |
| Brandon Campeau | 21 | Best Friends | Windsor, Ontario | Eliminated 1st (in Jasper National Park, Alberta) |
| Stéphane Tétreault | 51 | Father/Son | Montreal, Quebec | Eliminated 2nd (in Cái Bè, Vietnam) |
| Antoine Tétreault | 25 | Father/Son | Montreal, Quebec | Eliminated 2nd (in Cái Bè, Vietnam) |
| Anne Morrone | 40 | Best Friends/Moms | Toronto, Ontario | Eliminated 3rd (in Ho Chi Minh City, Vietnam) |
| Tanya Muzzatti | 40 | Best Friends/Moms | Toronto, Ontario | Eliminated 3rd (in Ho Chi Minh City, Vietnam) |
| Kelly Xu | 25 | Best Friends | Toronto, Ontario | Eliminated 4th (in Port Edward, British Columbia) |
| Kate Pan | 25 | Best Friends | Toronto, Ontario | Eliminated 4th (in Port Edward, British Columbia) |
| Julie Taylor | 33 | Married | Lethbridge, Alberta | Eliminated 5th (in Kingston, Ontario) |
| Lowell Taylor | 34 | Married | Lethbridge, Alberta | Eliminated 5th (in Kingston, Ontario) |
| Rita Yakibonge | 23 | Twin Sisters | Edmonton, Alberta | Eliminated 6th (in Louisbourg, Nova Scotia) |
| Yvette Yakibonge | 23 | Twin Sisters | Edmonton, Alberta | Eliminated 6th (in Louisbourg, Nova Scotia) |
| Frankie Gassler | 41 | Mother/Daughter | Aldergrove, British Columbia | Eliminated 7th (in Saint Andrews, New Brunswick) |
| Amy Gassler | 25 | Mother/Daughter | Aldergrove, British Columbia | Eliminated 7th (in Saint Andrews, New Brunswick) |
| Joel Ground | 42 | Father/Daughter | Enoch Cree Nation, Alberta | Third place |
| Ashley Callingbull-Burnham | 26 | Father/Daughter | Enoch Cree Nation, Alberta | Third place |
| Jillian McLaughlin | 30 | Exes | New Glasgow, Nova Scotia | Runners-up |
| Emmett Blois | 28 | Exes | Gore, Nova Scotia | Runners-up |
| Steph LeClair | 27 | Dating | Toronto, Ontario | Winners |
| Kristen McKenzie | 25 | Dating | Toronto, Ontario | Winners |

== Results ==
The following teams are listed with their placements in each leg. Placements are listed in finishing order.

- A red placement with a dagger (†) indicates that the team was eliminated.
- An underlined blue placement with a double-dagger (‡) indicates that the team was the last to arrive at a Pit Stop in a non-elimination leg, and had to perform a Speed Bump task in the following leg.
- An italicized and underlined placement indicates that the team was the last to arrive at a Pit Stop, but there was no rest period at the Pit Stop and all teams were instructed to continue racing.
- A purple ε indicates that the team used an Express Pass on that leg to bypass one of their tasks.
- A brown ⊃ indicates that the team used the U-Turn and a brown ⊂ indicates the team on the receiving end of the U-Turn.
- A teal х indicates that the leg featured a Face Off challenge.

Team placement (by leg)
| Team | 1 | 2 | 3 (Note: Four of the nine teams who arrived at the Pit Stop were issued 30-minute penalties for taking a water taxi from the floating market instead of the public ferry as the clue had instructed. This did not affect Joel & Ashley's placement, while Jillian & Emmett, Rita & Yvette, and Anne & Tanya each dropped one place from their initial placements.) | 4 | 5 | 6 | 7 | 8х (Note: This leg featured a Face Off challenge.) | 9 | 10х | 11 |
|---|---|---|---|---|---|---|---|---|---|---|---|
| Steph & Kristen | 2nd | 6th | 2nd | 2nd | 1st | 1st | 1st⊃ (Note: Steph & Kristen chose to use the U-Turn on Jillian & Emmett.) | 3rd | 2nd⊃ (Note: Steph & Kristen chose to use the U-Turn on Joel & Ashley.) | 1st | 1st |
| Jillian & Emmett | 1st | 1st | 4th | 7th | 2nd | 2nd | 4th^{⊂}_{⊃} (Note: Jillian & Emmett chose to use the U-Turn on Joel & Ashley.) | 1st | 1st⊃ (Note: Jillian & Emmett chose to use the U-Turn on Rita & Yvette.) | 3rd | 2nd |
| Joel & Ashley | 4th | 4th | 1st | 5th | 4th | 6th (Note: This team arrived last at the Pit Stop, but they were instructed to continue racing.) | 3rd⊂ | 2nd | 4th⊂ | 2nd | 3rd |
| Frankie & Amy | 6th | 3rd | 5th | 4th | 3rd | 5thɛ (Note: This team used their Express Pass to bypass one of the tasks on this leg.) | 5th | 4th | 3rd | 4th† | |
| Rita & Yvette | 7th | 8th | 6th | 3rd | 5th | 4th | 2nd | 5th‡ | 5th†⊂ | | |
| Julie & Lowell | 5th | 7th | 7th | 6th | 6th | 3rd | 6th† | | | | |
| Kelly & Kate | 9th (Note: Kelly & Kate and Anthony & Brandon initially arrived 3rd and 4th, respectively, but both teams were issued 4-hour penalties for failing to complete the first Roadblock. Kelly & Kate dropped to 9th, while Anthony & Brandon dropped to last.) | 9th‡ | 3rd | 1st | 7th† | | | | | | |
| Anne & Tanya | 8th | 5th | 8th | 8th† | | | | | | | |
| Stéphane & Antoine | 3rd | 2nd | 9th† (Note: Stéphane & Antoine checked in while Anne & Tanya were still serving their penalty, but were issued a 4-hour penalty for failing to complete the Roadblock. Because Stéphane & Antoine's penalty time exceeded Anne & Tanya's remaining penalty time, Anne & Tanya checked in at 8th with the remainder of their penalty to be enforced at the start of the next leg, while Stéphane & Antoine were eliminated without the 4-hour penalty being assessed.) | | | | | | | | |
| Anthony & Brandon | 10th† | | | | | | | | | | |

== Race summary ==
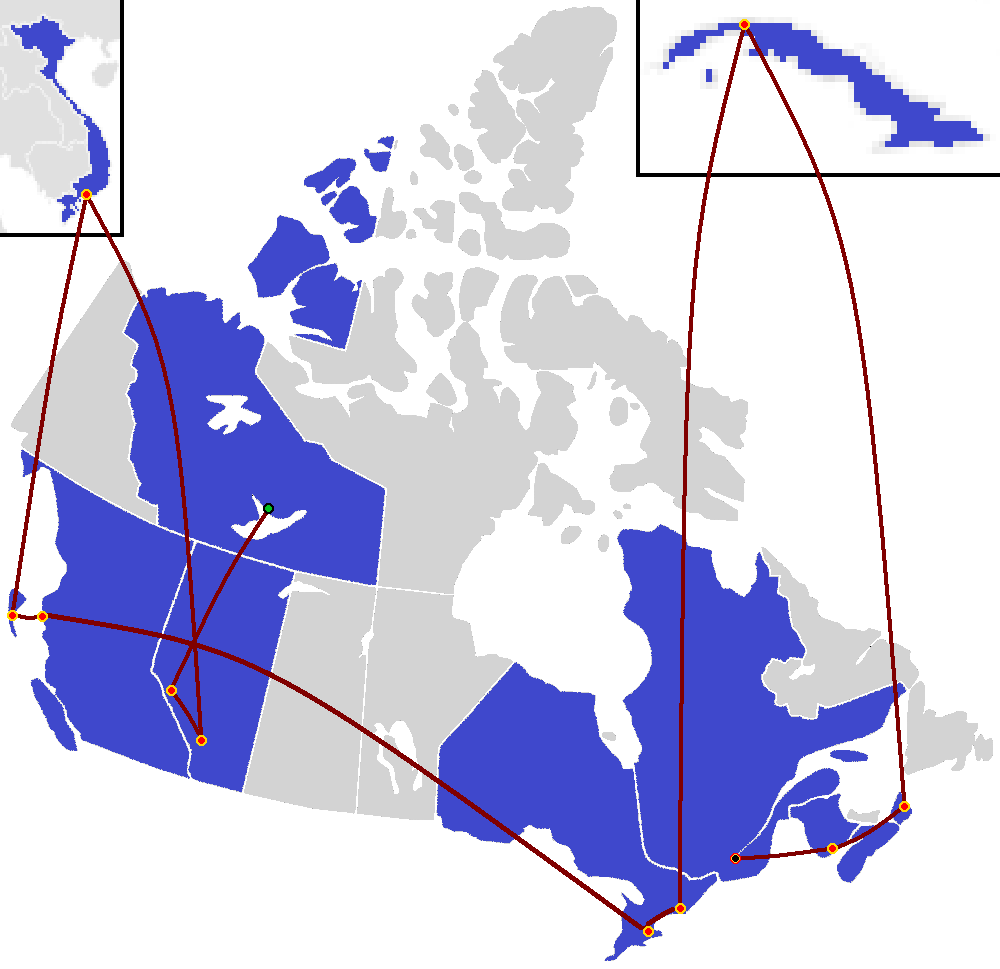
Complete route map

| Destinations | Air travel Rail travel Water travel Bus travel Helicopter travel Bicycle travel Gondola travel |
| Route Markers | Detour Roadblock Face Off Express Pass; U-Turn Speed Bump Pit Stop |

=== Leg 1 (Northwest Territories → Alberta) ===
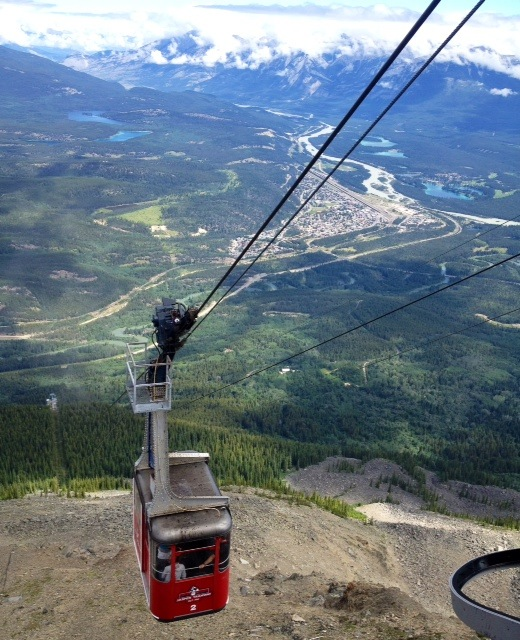
The first Roadblock of this leg took place on the Jasper Skytram.

- Episode 1: "Who's Ready to Let It All Hang Out?" (June 28, 2016)
- Prize: A trip for two to London, England (awarded to Jillian & Emmett)
- Eliminated: Anthony & Brandon

Locations

- Yellowknife, Northwest Territories (Frame Lake) (Starting Line)
- Yellowknife (Prince of Wales Northern Heritage Centre – Ceremonial Circle)
- Yellowknife (Northwest Territories Legislative Assembly)
- Yellowknife (Yellowknife Airport) → Edmonton, Alberta (Edmonton International Airport)
- Edmonton → Jasper (Jasper Train Station)
- Jasper (Jasper Skytram)
- Jasper National Park (Athabasca River)
- Jasper National Park (Two Valley Creek Canyon)
- Jasper National Park (Pyramid Lake – Pyramid Island)

Episode summary

- From Frame Lake, teams had to run to the ceremonial circle at the Prince of Wales Northern Heritage Centre, where they found their first clue directing them to the Northwest Territories Legislative Assembly. There, teams had to locate a wooden greeting containing a phrase written in Weledeh: Hotìa dechı̨nta k'èahdè ("Travel safely across the land"). They then had to search the nearby forest, where tags containing words of the same language and their translation were hanging from the trees were, for ones matching their clue. They then had to correctly recite the phrase in English to an Elder in order to receive their next clue. Teams also received a Bank of Montreal credit card that served as the teams' source of money for the rest of the season.
- After the first task, teams had to drive to Yellowknife Airport and book one of two flights to Edmonton, Alberta, with the first four teams on the first flight. Once there, teams boarded a bus to the town of Jasper and found their next clue outside of the Jasper Train Station.
- In this season's first Roadblock, one team member was equipped with a bungee cord and rode in the Jasper Skytram, which stop midair halfway up the mountain. At this point, they climbed out of the tram and used monkey bars underneath in order to reach their clue on the other side. Only three teams were permitted in the Skytram at a time. If they fell, they had to wait in line for the next crossing.
- After the first Roadblock, teams had to paddle a raft along the Athabasca River and find their next clue on the shoreline.
- In this leg's second Roadblock, teams had to drive themselves to Two Valley Creek Canyon. Here, the team member who did not perform the previous Roadblock had to rappel down into the canyon and then search the river valley on foot for a Parks Canada representative who gave them an avalanche beacon, which they used to locate one of three caches containing their next clue directing them to the Pit Stop on Pyramid Island.

=== Leg 2 (Alberta) ===
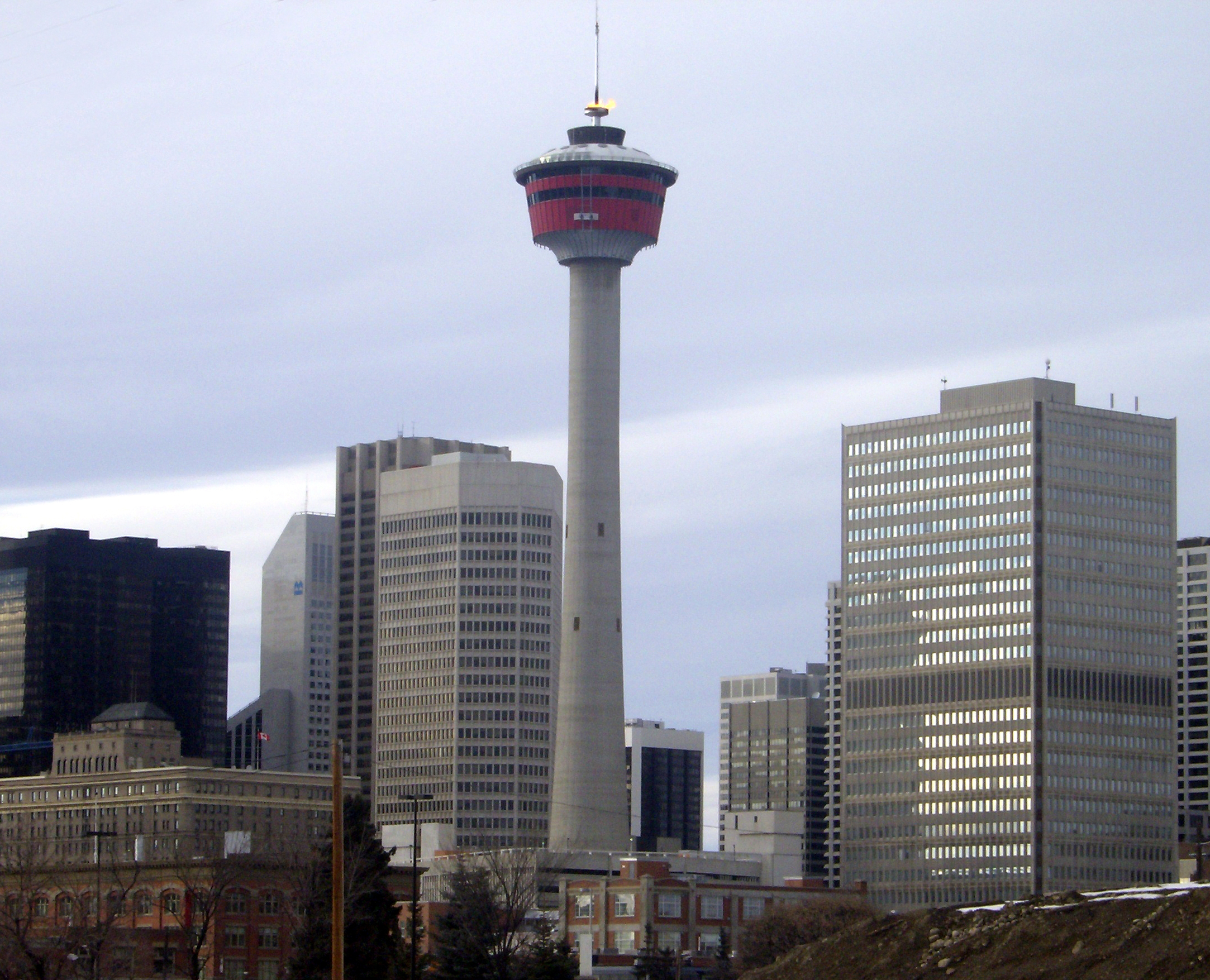
The Roadblock in Calgary had racers rappel down the Calgary Tower.

- Episode 2: "Deal, Guys? Deal! Deal!" (July 5, 2016)
- Prize: A trip for two to Paris, France (awarded to Jillian & Emmett)

Locations

- Jasper (Jasper Park Information Centre) → Calgary (City Hall)
- Calgary (The Bow – Wonderland)
- Calgary (Calgary Tower)
- Calgary (McDougall Centre, Harley Hotchkiss Gardens or Century Gardens – Beatnik Bus)
- Calgary (Canada Boy Vinyl)
- Calgary (Southern Alberta Institute of Technology or Bow Habitat Station – Sam Livingston Fish Hatchery)
- Calgary (Studio Bell – National Music Centre)

Episode summary

- At the Jasper Park Information Centre, teams had to sign up for one of three buses to Calgary, each of which carried three teams. When they arrived at Calgary City Hall, teams were greeted by Mayor Naheed Nenshi, who gave them a photograph of a sculpture. They had to figure out that this was the Wonderland sculpture at The Bow building, where they found their next clue.
- In this leg's Roadblock, one team member had to rappel from the roof of the Calgary Tower to the street below in order to receive their next clue from Seefar, the Calgary Tower mascot.
- Teams had to track down the Beatnik Bus, a mobile record store, by using a local's cellphone to check its social media accounts for hints as to its location. The bus stopped for ten minutes at a time at three locations around downtown: the McDougall Centre, the Harley Hotchkiss Gardens, and the Century Gardens. Once teams found the bus, they could receive their next clue from a local musician after listening to him perform one of his songs.
- This season's first Detour was a choice between Sim or Swim. In Sim, teams travelled to the Mayland Heights campus of the Southern Alberta Institute of Technology, where they had to use a training simulator to guide a crane's payload through a course on a simulated construction site without hitting any obstacles. If both team members successfully completed the course in a combined time of under six minutes, they received their next clue. In Swim, teams travelled to the Sam Livingston Fish Hatchery at the Bow Habitat Station, where they had to use a barrier to corral a school of rainbow troutlings into a confined area and then use nets to transfer the troutlings into two cages in order to receive their next clue.
- Teams also had the option of going for two Express Passes. For this, they travelled to Canada Boy Vinyl, where they had to search for the Express Passes among thirteen crates of newly pressed vinyl records, while placing each record they picked up into an album sleeve. Steph & Kristen found the Express Passes.
- After the Detour, teams had to check into the Pit Stop at the National Music Centre.

Additional note

- This was a non-elimination leg.

=== Leg 3 (Alberta → Vietnam) ===
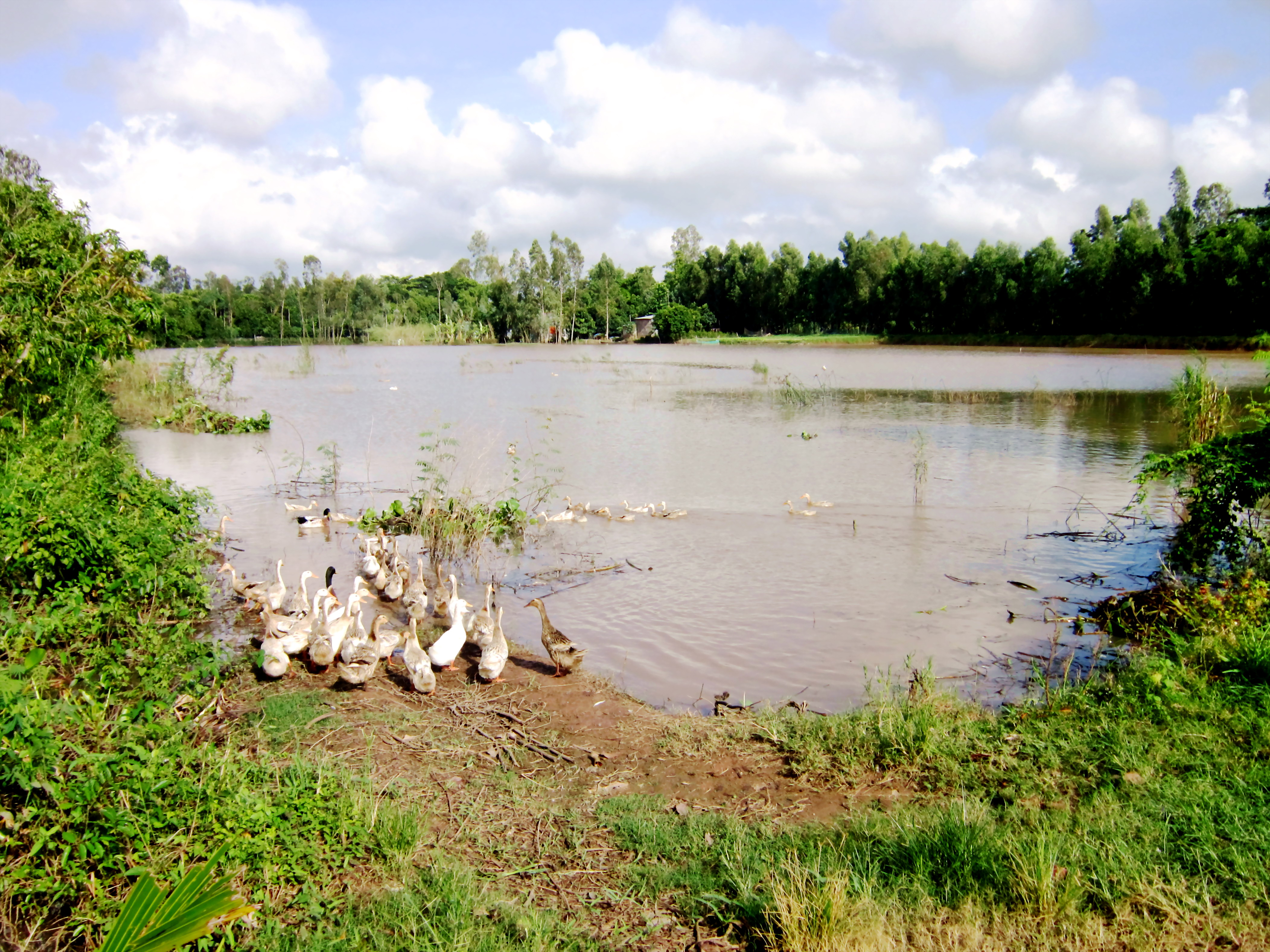
In Cái Bè, within Vietnam's Mekong Delta, racers participated in a duck herding Roadblock.

- Episode 3: "Toads! Are You Kidding Me?" (July 12, 2016)
- Prize: A trip for two to Tokyo, Japan (awarded to Joel & Ashley)
- Eliminated: Stéphane & Antoine

Locations

- Calgary (Peace Bridge)
- Calgary → Ho Chi Minh City, Vietnam
- Cái Bè (Tourist Dock)
- Cái Bè (Tourist Dock → Cái Bè Floating Market)
- Cái Bè (Cái Bè Floating Market → Tân Phong Island)
- Tân Phong Island → Cái Bè (Bến Phà Cái Bè Qua Tân Phong)
- Cái Bè (Cái Bè Land Market)
- Cái Bè (Phước Ân Temple or Mekong Delta Canal)
- Cái Bè (Mekong Lodge)

Episode summary

- At the start of this leg, teams were instructed to fly to Ho Chi Minh City, Vietnam and then travel to the tourist dock in Cái Bè. There, teams had to sign up for a water taxi departing the next morning, when they also received their next clue. After boarding the water taxi, teams were given a shopping list written in Vietnamese with four items that they had to find within the floating market: a ceramic statue, fermented tofu, a basket of fruit, and a 10-kilogram (22 lb) bag of rice. They then had to deliver them to Tân Phong Island in order to receive their next clue, which instructed them to travel by ferry back to Cái Bè, where they found their next clue at the ferry terminal.
- In this leg's Roadblock, one team member had to use a stick with a small flag attached to separate and herd 20 ducks out of a flock of 300 into a pen in order to receive their next clue.
- After the Roadblock, teams had to carry two ducks by hand to the Cái Bè Land Market and deliver them to a marked stall in exchange for the Detour clue.
- For their Speed Bump, Kelly & Kate had to carry a total of 20 toads by hand through the Cái Bè Land Market to a marked stall before they could continue racing.
- This leg's Detour was a choice between Vibrate or Hydrate. In Vibrate, teams travelled to Phước Ân Temple, where they had to correctly perform a traditional Vietnamese drum dance in order to receive their next clue. In Hydrate, teams had to load a sampan with 60 coconuts and row down a canal to a marked dock, where they had to unload and carry them to a nearby coconut water hut in order to receive their next clue.
- After the Detour, teams had to take a water taxi to Mekong Lodge and check in at the Pit Stop.

=== Leg 4 (Vietnam) ===
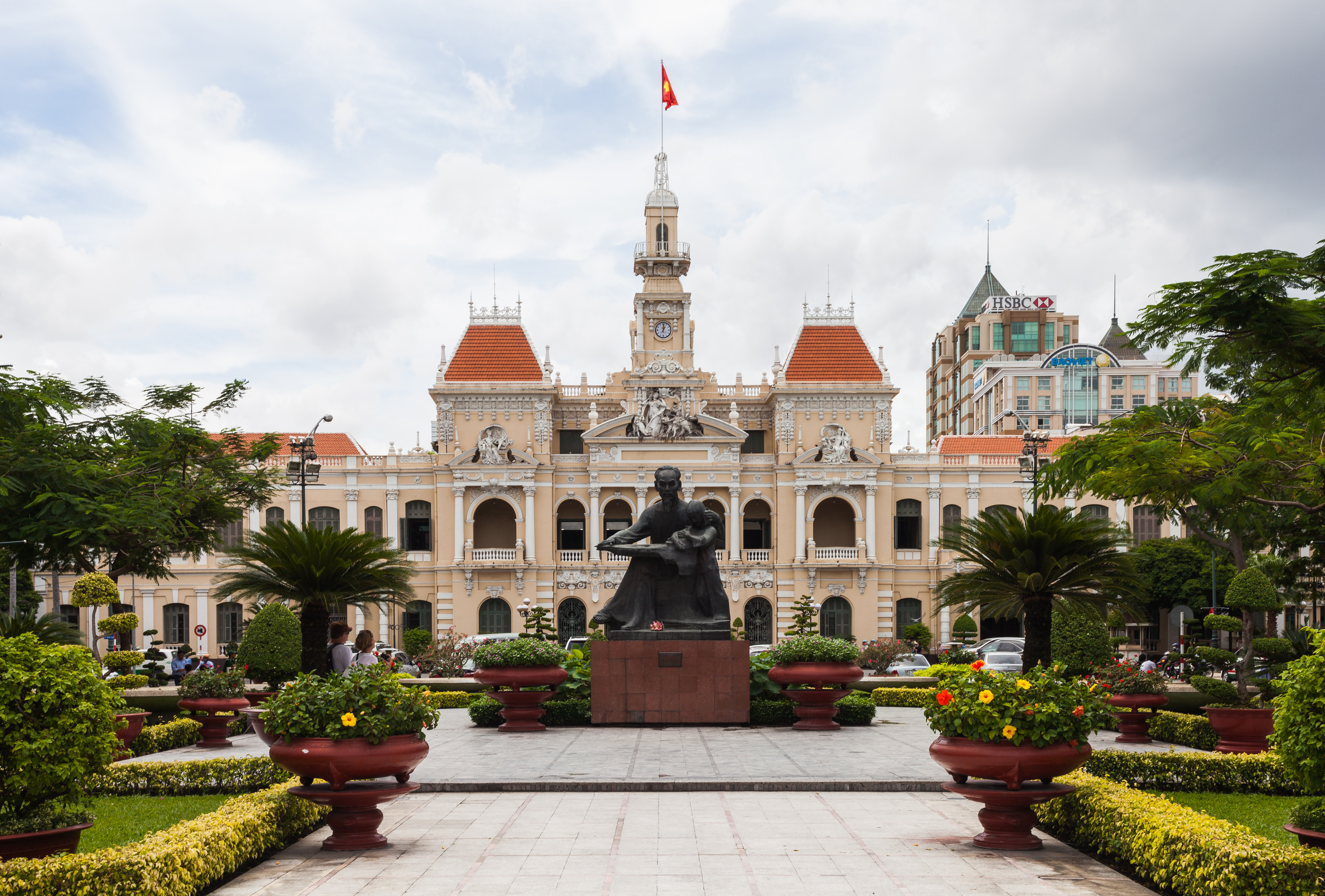
Teams ended this leg in the square in front of Ho Chi Minh City Hall.

- Episode 4: "Shine Your Light" (July 19, 2016)
- Prize: A trip for two to Los Angeles, California (awarded to Kelly & Kate)
- Eliminated: Anne & Tanya

Locations

- Cái Bè (Mekong Lodge)
- Cái Bè (Mekong Lodge → Tourist Dock)
- Cái Bè → Ho Chi Minh City
- Ho Chi Minh City (Chợ Lớn – Bà Thiên Hậu Temple)
- Ho Chi Minh City (Corner of Lý Chính Thắng Street & Nguyễn Thông Street)
- Ho Chi Minh City (Sửa Chữa Bảo Dưỡng)
- Ho Chi Minh City (District 1 – Quán Ốc A Sòi)
- Ho Chi Minh City (Glow Skybar or Kingdom Karaoke)
- Ho Chi Minh City (City Hall)

Episode summary

- At the start of the leg, teams had to travel by water taxi to the tourist dock, and then travel by bus to Ho Chi Minh City. Once there, teams had to travel to Bà Thiên Hậu Temple, where they had to choose two birdcages and release the birds in order to receive their next clue. Teams found their next clue at the corner of Lý Chính Thắng Street & Nguyễn Thông Street.
- In the leg's Roadblock, one team member had to correctly assemble a scooter using only an instruction manual written in Vietnamese and a sample scooter as a reference in order to receive their next clue.
- After the Roadblock, teams had to travel to Quán Ốc A Sòi and eat a dish of fried crickets, centipedes, worms, and a bat before receiving a box containing two live red palm weevil larvae (known locally as "coconut worms"). Each team member then had to consume one coconut worm in order to receive their next clue.
- This leg's Detour was a choice between Flip Flop or V-Pop. In Flip Flop, teams travelled to Glow Skybar, where they watched a demonstration of a flair bartending routine and the mixing of the bar's signature cocktail: the "Hello Vietnam". Teams then had to precisely recreate the routine and the cocktail in order to receive their next clue. In V-Pop, teams travelled to Kingdom Karaoke, where each team member had to correctly memorize at least one verse of the V-pop song "Shine Your Light", and then perform karaoke in front of an audience. If the song was performed correctly, teams could receive their next clue.
- After the Detour, teams had to check in at the Pit Stop: City Hall.

=== Leg 5 (Vietnam → British Columbia) ===
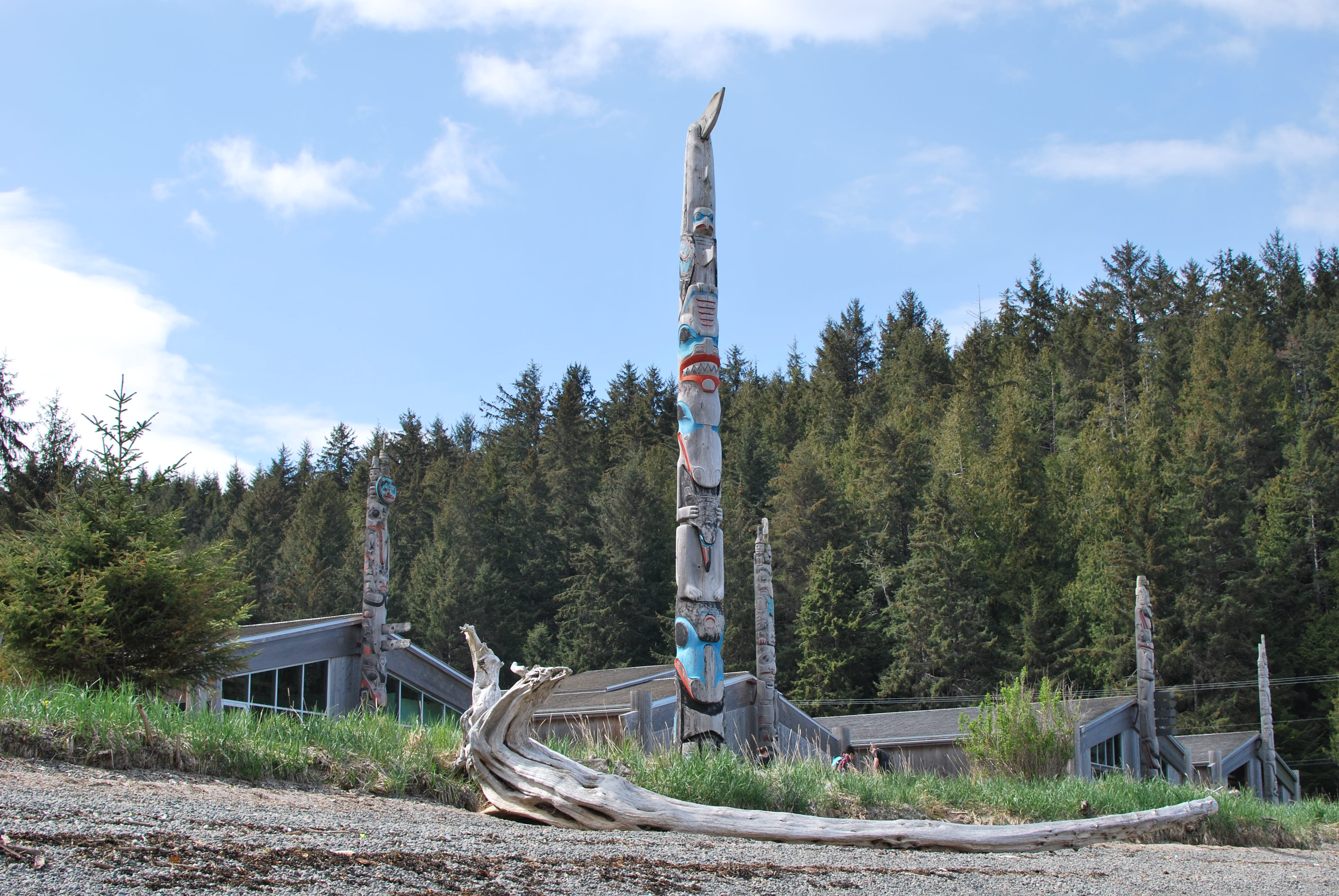
In British Columbia, teams encountered a Roadblock involving Haida totem poles in Haida Gwaii.

- Episode 5: "The Little Blind Tugboat That Could" (July 26, 2016)
- Prize: A trip for two to New York City, New York (awarded to Steph & Kristen)
- Eliminated: Kelly & Kate

Locations

- Ho Chi Minh City (September 23 Park)
- Ho Chi Minh City → Sandspit, British Columbia
- Alliford Bay → Skidegate
- Skidegate (Haida Heritage Centre)
- Skidegate (Spirit Lake Trail)
- Queen Charlotte City → Prince Rupert
- Prince Rupert (City Hall – Charles Melville Hays Statue)
- Prince Rupert (Cow Bay Marina)
- Port Edward (North Pacific Cannery National Historic Site)

Episode summary

- At the start of the leg, teams were instructed to fly to Haida Gwaii. Upon arrival in Sandspit, British Columbia, teams had to travel by ferry to Skidegate on Graham Island. They then had to drive to the Haida Heritage Centre, where they found their next clue.
- In this leg's first Roadblock, one team member had to listen to six Haida storytellers, who each told the story depicted on one of the totem poles outside the Haida Heritage Centre, as well as the name of its carver. They then had to correctly identify all six totem poles by carver to a judge on the nearby beach in order to receive their next clue.
- After the first Roadblock, teams had to travel to the end of the Spirit Lake Trail and assemble two sets of puzzle pieces to form two works of contemporary Haida art in order to receive their next clue. Teams drove to the Queen Charlotte City Harbour and travelled by seaplane to the coastal city of Prince Rupert. They then had to locate the statue of the city's founder, Charles Melville Hays, located in front of City Hall in order to find their next clue.
- In this leg's second Roadblock, teams travelled to Cow Bay Marina and took a water taxi, which departed every 20 minutes, to a log boom floating in the middle of the bay. Here, the team member who did not perform the previous Roadblock had to choose a lane and pilot a small tugboat equipped with a dozer blade to find three small marked timber rafts and push them to a dispatcher at the other end of the lane in order to receive their next clue directing them to the Pit Stop: the North Pacific Cannery National Historic Site in Port Edward.

=== Leg 6 (British Columbia → Ontario) ===
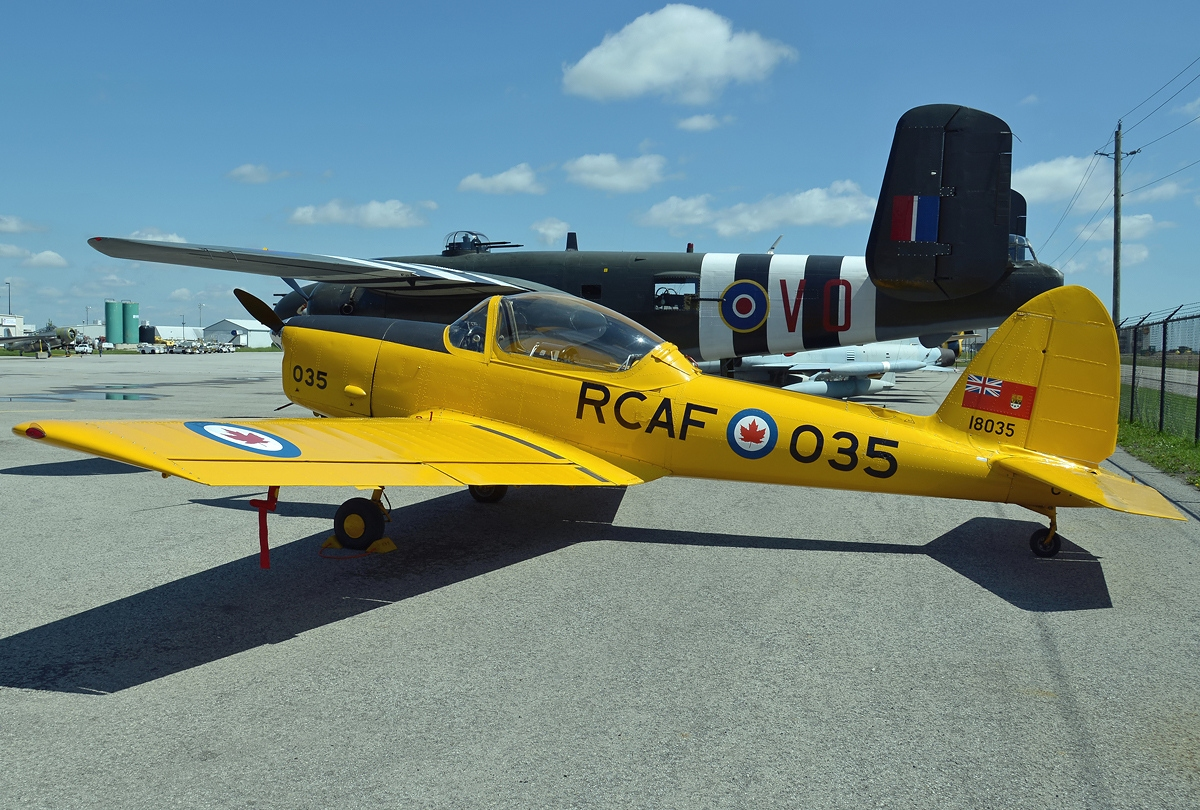
The Roadblock in Hamilton required racers to fly in vintage de Havilland Chipmunks at the Canadian Warplane Heritage Museum.

- Episode 6: "Am I Actually Operating the Plane?" (August 2, 2016)
- Prize: A trip for two to Delhi, India (awarded to Steph & Kristen)

Locations

- Prince Rupert (Sunken Gardens Park)
- Prince Rupert → Toronto, Ontario
- Hamilton (Bank of Montreal Hamilton Main Branch)
- Hamilton (John C. Munro Hamilton International Airport – Canadian Warplane Heritage Museum)
- Hamilton (Bayfront Park)
- Hamilton (Heddle Marine Service or Collective Arts Brewing)
- Hamilton (Dundurn Castle)

Episode summary

- At the start of the leg, teams were instructed to travel to Hamilton, Ontario. After arriving in Toronto, teams had to travel to downtown Hamilton and find the Bank of Montreal main branch. There, each team received a video message from their loved ones who informed them of the location of their next clue: the Canadian Warplane Heritage Museum.
- In this leg's Roadblock, one team member was flown with an instructor in one of three vintage de Havilland Chipmunks to an altitude of 2,000 feet (610 m), at which point they were given control of the airplane and had to correctly perform a 360° rate one turn while maintaining a constant speed and altitude in order to receive their next clue. Frankie & Amy used their Express Pass to bypass this Roadblock.
- After the Roadblock, teams had to travel to Bayfront Park. There, they had to ride bicycles along a trail to a marked boat launch and then paddle kayaks across Hamilton Harbour to an outdoor climbing wall, which each team member had to climb and ring a bell at the top in order to receive their next clue.
- This leg's Detour was a choice between Dry Dock or Art Rock. In Dry Dock, teams travelled to Heddle Marine Service and entered the dry dock, where each team member had to suit up in protective gear and then properly weld an airtight seal on an eight-inch (20 cm) section of structural steel in order to receive their next clue. In Art Rock, teams travelled to Collective Arts Brewing, where they had to recreate a work of spray paint art by using stencils to apply coloured layers in a specific order. If their work matched the example, teams could then take it to the brewery's stage and receive their next clue from the band Elliott BROOD.
- After the Detour, teams had to check in at the Pit Stop: Dundurn Castle.

Additional note

- There was no elimination at the end of this leg; all teams were instead instructed to continue racing.

=== Leg 7 (Ontario) ===
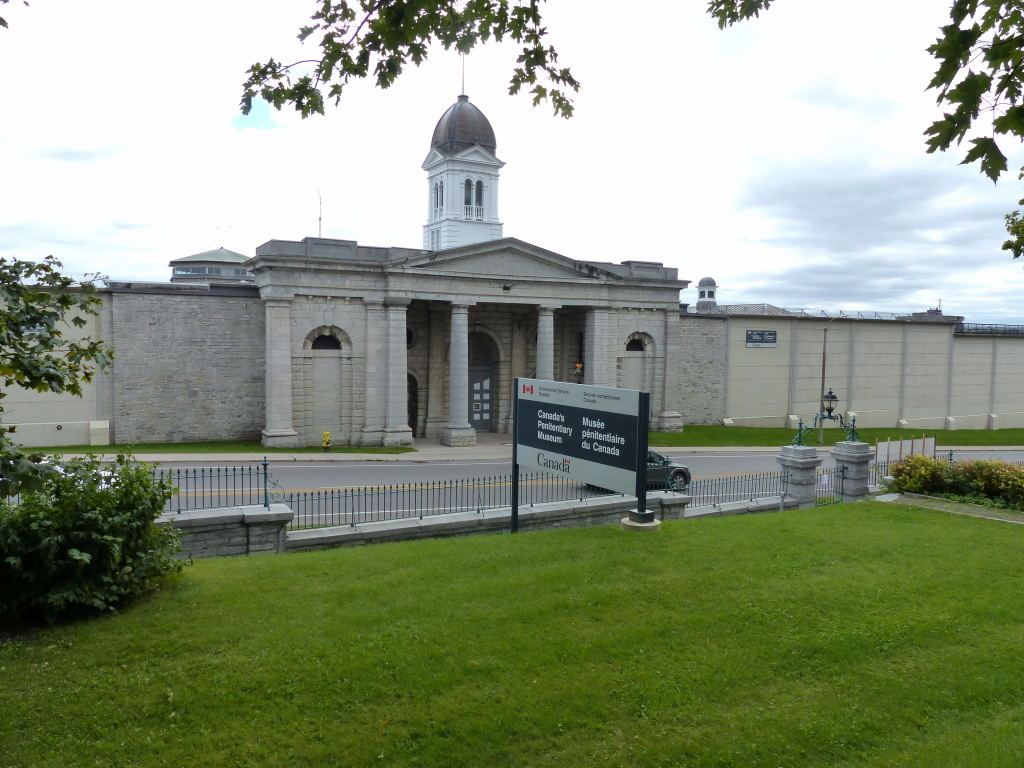
While in Kingston, teams visited the penitentiary, one of the oldest prisons in Canada, and searched for clue envelopes among the cells.

- Episode 7: "I Could Be Prime Minister" (August 9, 2016)
- Prize: A trip for two to Rome, Italy (awarded to Steph & Kristen)
- Eliminated: Julie & Lowell

Locations

- Burlington → Toronto
- Toronto → Kingston
- Kingston (Springer Market Square)
- Kingston (Clarence Street)
- Kingston (Queen's University – Nixon Field or Kingston Yacht Club)
- Kingston (Kingston Penitentiary)
- Kingston (Bellevue House)
- Kingston (Rideau Canal – Kingston Mills Lock Station)

Episode summary

- At the start of the leg, teams were instructed to travel by train via Toronto to Kingston, Ontario. Once there, teams had to travel to the Springer Market Square in front of City Hall and search for the Vader's Maple Syrup stand, where they found their next clue. Teams then had to search Clarence Street for several marked vehicles, each with a four-digit licence plate, and six locked cases, each with a tablet computer inside. Once teams found a licence plate number that opened a case, they could use an app on the tablet to unlock the vehicle as well as retrieve their next clue.
- This leg's Detour was a choice between On the Field or Offshore. (Note: The Detour options on teams' clues were listed as On the Field or Offshore; however, both Jon and the graphics on the show listed the Detour options as Higher Education and High Seas.) In On the Field, teams travelled to Nixon Field at Queen's University, where they had to wear Bumperz and complete a series of bubble soccer drills against the university's women's soccer players. They had to perform a somersault, pass a soccer ball back and forth between each other, and finally score a goal while the goalie attempted to ram the scoring team member in under 25 seconds before receiving their next clue from the university's mascot, Boo Hoo the Bear. In Offshore, teams travelled to the Kingston Yacht Club, where they had to properly rig a sailboat and then sail it out to a buoy, where they could retrieve their clue before returning to the dock.
- After the Detour, teams were directed to Kingston Penitentiary. There, they had to enter the penitentiary and search among 400 cells for their next clue directing them to Bellevue House.
- In this leg's Roadblock, one team member had to dress as the first Prime Minister of Canada, Sir John A. Macdonald, and then memorize and correctly recite one of Macdonald's political speeches, which included prompts to ring a bell, to an audience of historical players in order to receive their next clue directing them to the Pit Stop at Kingston Mills Lock Station.

Additional note

- This leg featured a Double U-Turn. Steph & Kristen chose to use the U-Turn on Jillian & Emmett, while Jillian & Emmett chose to use the U-Turn on Joel & Ashley.

=== Leg 8 (Ontario → Cuba) ===
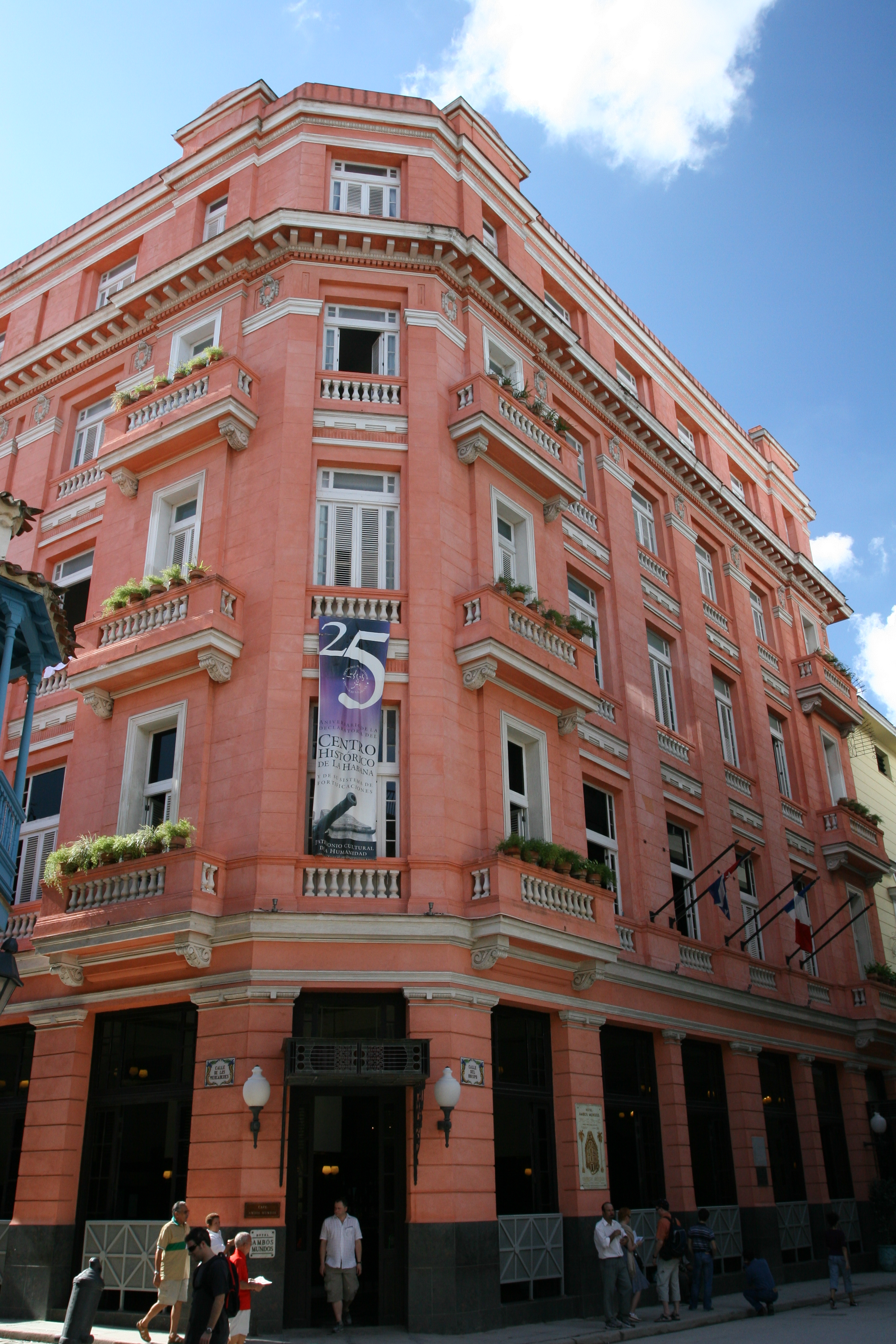
While in Cuba, teams visited the Hotel Ambos Mundos in Old Havana, once the home of Ernest Hemingway.

- Episode 8: "I Just Wanna Win" (August 23, 2016)
- Prize: A trip for two to Cancún, Mexico (awarded to Jillian & Emmett)

Locations

- Kingston (Kingston City Hall)
- Kingston → Toronto
- Toronto → Havana, Cuba
- Havana (Castillo de la Real Fuerza)
- Havana (Old Havana – Havana Club Rum Museum & Park Humboldt or Park Humboldt)
- Havana (Old Havana – Cámara Oscura)
- Havana (Old Havana – Hotel Ambos Mundos)
- Havana (Habana del Este – Playas del Este)
- Havana (Pedrito's Max Brakes)
- Havana (El Morro – Restaurante La Divina Pastora)

Episode summary

- At the start of the leg, teams were instructed to travel by train to Toronto and then fly to Havana, Cuba. Once there, teams had to search the Castillo de la Real Fuerza for their next clue by a scale model replica of the Canadian schooner Bluenose.
- This leg's Detour was a choice between Sugar or Shake. In Sugar, teams travelled to the Havana Club Rum Museum and, using a manual grinder, had to extract 15 litres (4.0 US gal) of sugar juice from sugar cane. Then, each team member had to deliver two trays of drinks on foot to Park Humboldt and then make their way back to the museum in order to get their next clue. In Shake, teams went directly to Park Humboldt, where they had to correctly perform a Salsa Cubana routine in order to receive their next clue.
- After the Detour, teams had to listen to a guided tour at Cámara Oscura and spot an Amazing Race flag hanging on the Hotel Ambos Mundos. The tour guide told them that the hotel is the site of the Ernest Hemingway Museum in room 511, where teams found their next clue.
- For this season's first Face Off, teams had to compete against each other in a game of beach volleyball. The first team to score 15 points received their next clue, while their opponents had to wait for another team. The last losing team had to wait for the sand to run out of an hourglass before receiving their clue.
- After the Face Off, teams found their next clue at Pedrito's Max Brakes.
- In this leg's Roadblock, one team member had to watch a demonstration and then correctly make three engine gaskets from old tire rubber in order to receive their next clue directing them to the Pit Stop at Restaurante La Divina Pastora.

Additional note

- This was a non-elimination leg.

=== Leg 9 (Cuba → Nova Scotia) ===
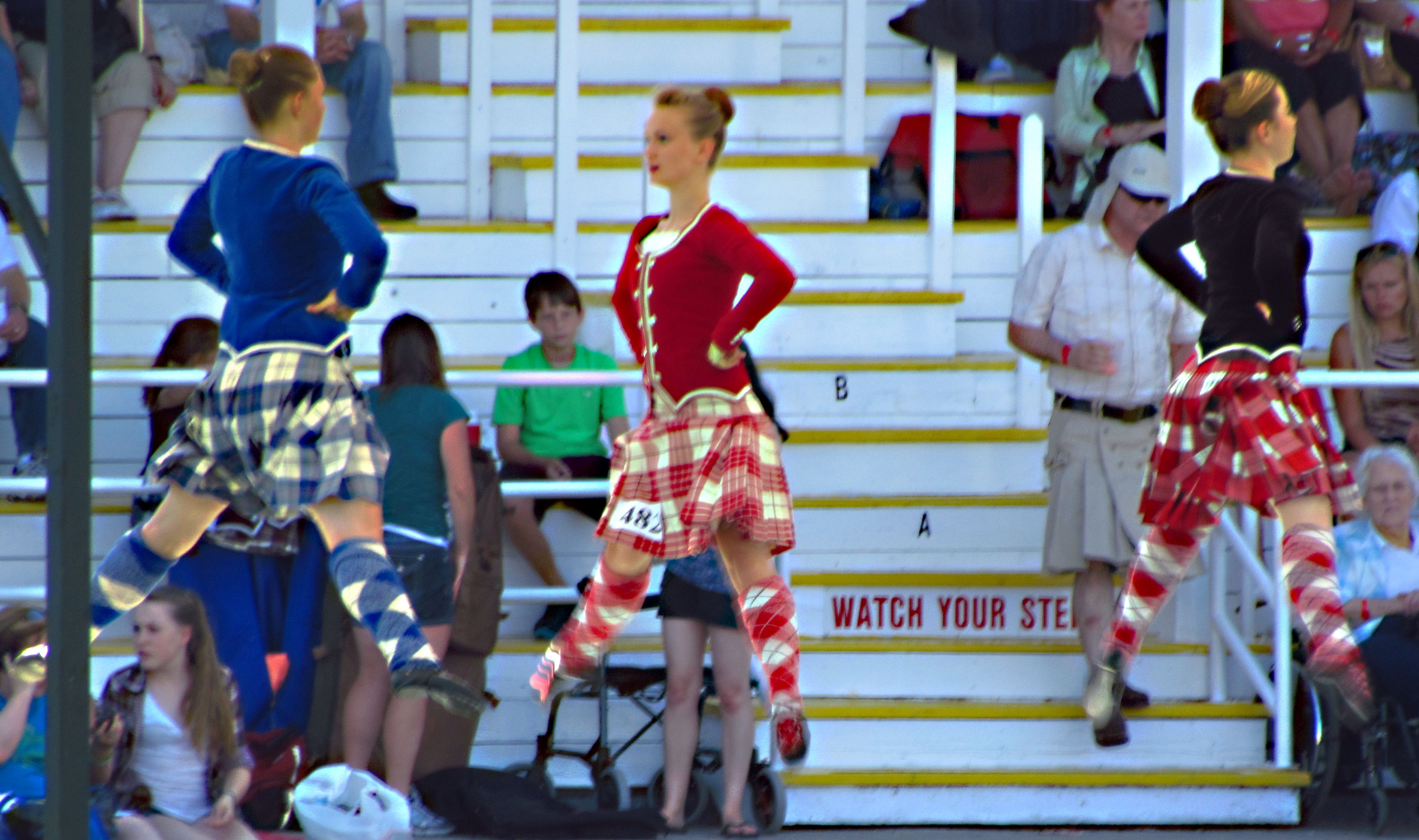
The Detour on Cape Breton Island had teams take part in events of the Highland Games, including Highland dancing.

- Episode 9: "For Those About to Rock" (August 30, 2016)
- Prize: A trip for two to Mexico City, Mexico (awarded to Jillian & Emmett)
- Eliminated: Rita & Yvette

Locations

- Havana (Hotel Meliá Habana)
- Havana → Sydney, Nova Scotia (JA Douglas McCurdy Sydney Airport)
- Sydney (Canadian Coast Guard College)
- Christmas Island (Post Office)
- Iona (Highland Village Museum)
- Iona (Highland Village Museum – Blackhouse)
- Louisbourg (Fortress of Louisbourg)
- Louisbourg (Louisbourg Lighthouse)

Episode summary

- At the start of the leg, teams were instructed to fly to Sydney, Nova Scotia. Once there, teams had to search outside of the airport for a marked car with their next clue. Teams then had to drive to the Canadian Coast Guard College in order to find their next clue. Teams were also informed that their mileage would be measured using the Teen Driver System feature, and the team who drove the fewest total miles in this leg would win a bonus $5,000 prize at the Pit Stop. Jillian & Emmett and Frankie & Amy both received this prize since they tied for the lowest mileage. Once there, teams were instructed to choose a vessel and take part in a Coast Guard rescue drill. They had to direct their driver to one of two marked locations using only nautical terminology. There, one team member then had to swim out to retrieve a dummy. After returning to shore, they then had to bring the dummy to a waiting ambulance. If teams brought back the correct dummy, they received their next clue.
- For their Speed Bump, Rita & Yvette had to deliver two sacks of letters from cadets of the Canadian Coast Guard College to the Christmas Island post office and then stamp every letter with the office's famous postmark before they could continue racing.
- This leg's Detour, at the Highland Village Museum, was a choice between Feel the Rhythm or Feel the Burn, both requiring teams to dress in traditional attire. In Feel the Rhythm, teams had to learn and correctly perform a traditional Scottish highland dance routine with a troupe in order to receive their next clue. In Feel the Burn, teams completed a series of three Highland Games events. First, each team member had to toss a caber so it landed end-over-end within designated lines. Then, they each had to carry or move either two heavy logs for two laps, or one log for four laps, around a marked course. Finally, each team member had to throw a stone such that it landed on one of two targets in order to receive their next clue.
- Teams travelled on foot to the Highland Village Museum's blackhouse, where they found their next clue. Teams then had to drive to the Fortress of Louisbourg for their next clue. There, teams had to dress in a period French military uniform and roll six heavy wooden barrels filled with simulated gunpowder through the grounds to the top of the fortress. After completing this, teams fired a cannon on the battlement before receiving their next clue, which directed them to the Pit Stop at the Louisbourg Lighthouse.

Additional notes

- This leg featured a Double U-Turn. Steph & Kristen chose to use the U-Turn on Joel & Ashley, while Jillian & Emmett chose to use the U-Turn on Rita & Yvette.
- Nova Scotian underground coal miner's choir The Men of the Deeps appeared as the Pit Stop greeters for this leg.

=== Leg 10 (Nova Scotia → New Brunswick) ===
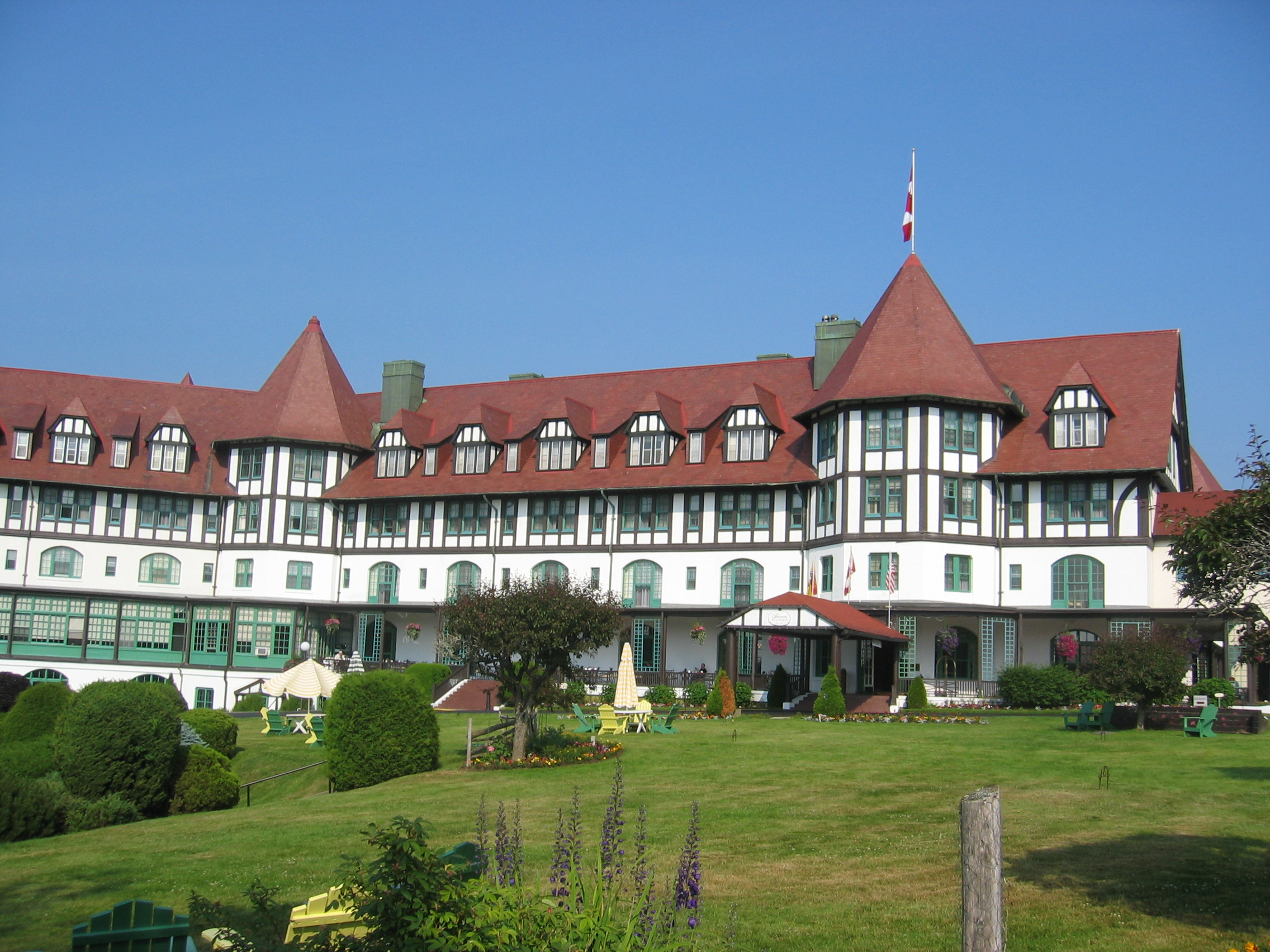
While in New Brunswick, teams encountered the last Face Off of the season by playing golf at the famous Algonquin Resort.

- Episode 10: "We're Doing It Wrong! We're In Big Trouble" (September 6, 2016)
- Prize: A trip for two to Sydney, Australia (awarded to Steph & Kristen)
- Eliminated: Frankie & Amy

Locations

- Sydney (Merchant Mariner Monument)
- Sydney (Port of Sydney) → Saint John, New Brunswick (Bank of Montreal)
- Saint John (Saint John City Market)
- Saint John (Moosehead Breweries or Crosby's Molasses)
- Saint Andrews (Algonquin Resort Golf Course)
- Saint Andrews (Kingsbrae Garden – Scents and Sensitivity Garden)
- Saint Andrews (Passamaquoddy Bay – Indian Point)

Episode summary

- Teams signed up for one of two buses, each carrying two teams, from Sydney to Saint John, New Brunswick. Once there, they had to search downtown for a marked vehicle, which contained their next clue. Teams then drove to the Saint John City Market and were given five gift baskets to deliver, each to a different hotel. To find the locations, they had to use a provided tablet to enter the search criteria listed on the delivery tag of each gift basket into an app. Once all five were successfully delivered, teams could return to the market to receive their next clue.
- This season's final Detour was a choice between 1867 or 1879. In 1867, teams travelled to Moosehead Breweries, where they had to choose one of five uniquely labeled beer bottles and pull enough matching bottles from a fast-moving production line in order to fill five 24-beer cases. They then had to stack a full pallet of cases in order to receive their next clue. In 1879, teams travelled to Crosby's Molasses, where they had to follow a recipe to prepare the company's signature molasses taffy. After the mixture was heated, teams then had to pull the mixture until they made at least 650 grams (23 oz) of taffy with the correct texture and colour in order to receive their next clue.
- For this season's second and final Face Off, teams drove to the Algonquin Resort Golf Course in Saint Andrews. At the 12th hole, teams competed in a round of golf. One team would take alternating strokes to sink their ball in the hole, then wait for their opponent to do the same. The team who took the fewest strokes received their next clue, while their opponents had to wait for another team. The last losing team had to wait for the sand to run out of an hourglass before receiving their clue.
- After the Face Off, teams found their next clue at the Scents and Sensitivity Garden.
- In this leg's Roadblock, teams entered the garden, where one team member was blindfolded for the duration of the task. They would first be led to one side of the garden by their partner, who read them the English names of fifteen plants they had to memorize, each distinguishable by a unique scent or texture. They then had to follow a guided rope on their own to the other side of the garden and correctly identify all 15 plants by touch or smell in to receive their next clue. If they guessed any incorrectly, they were led back to their partner to try again.
- After the Roadblock, teams had to use the hands-free OnStar feature in their vehicle to call Jon Montgomery, who told them to search for the Pit Stop at Indian Point on the shore of Passamaquoddy Bay.

=== Leg 11 (New Brunswick → Quebec) ===
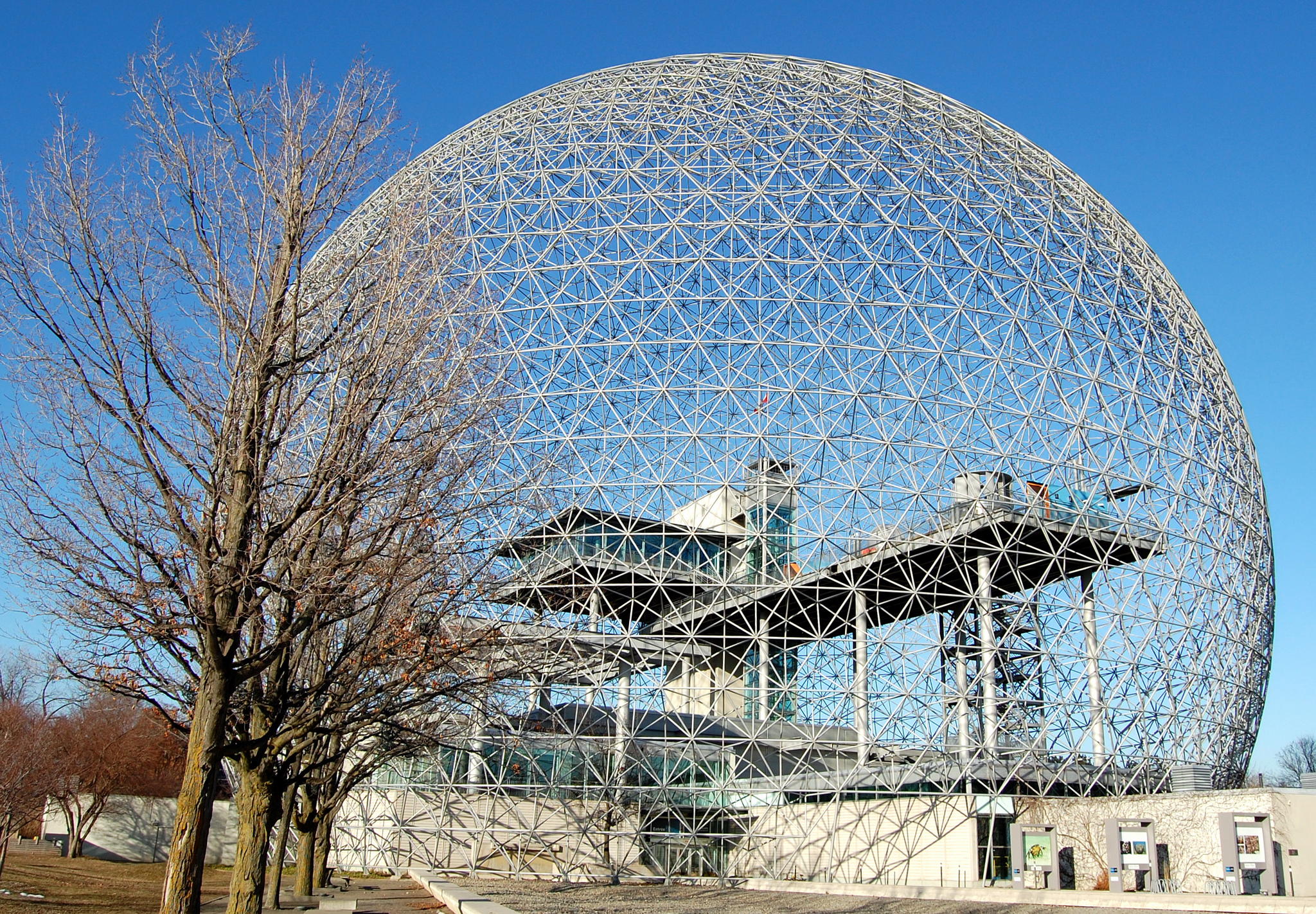
Teams visited the Montreal Biosphere on Saint Helen's Island for a Roadblock on the final leg.

- Episode 11: "Second Place Isn't Good Enough" (September 13, 2016)
- Prize: CA$250,000, a trip for two around the world, and two Chevrolet Silverados (awarded to Steph & Kristen)
- Winners: Steph & Kristen
- Runners-up: Jillian & Emmett
- Third place: Joel & Ashley

Locations

- Saint John (Hilton Saint John)
- Saint John → Montreal, Quebec
- Montreal (Saint-Michel – Cirque du Soleil World Headquarters)
- Montreal (Old Montreal – Bank of Montreal Head Office)
- Montreal (Saint Helen's Island – Montreal Biosphere)
- Montreal (St-Viateur Bagel & Mile End)
- Montreal (Moment Factory)
- Montreal (Mont-Royal – Kondiaronk Belvedere)

Episode summary

- At the start of the leg, teams were instructed to fly to Montreal and find their next clue at the Cirque du Soleil World Headquarters. There, teams had to dress in costumes and complete a series of three Cirque de Soleil tricks, with each racer required to perform at least one. First, one team member was harnessed with bungee cords and had to bounce and gain enough momentum to reach a trapeze. Next, one team member had to stand on and roll a large ball across the room without falling. Finally, one team member had to scale a Chinese pole in order to grab their next clue directing them to the Bank of Montreal Head Office. There, teams had to use a codebook to decipher an encoded message relating to the bank's history and then read it to a bank teller. If it was correct, teams received a key, which they could use to enter the vault and unlock a safe deposit box containing their next clue.
- In this leg's first Roadblock, teams travelled to the Montreal Biosphere on Saint Helen's Island. Inside the sphere, one team member had to use a mechanical ascender to climb 150 feet (46 m) to the museum's observation deck, pull themselves horizontally across a suspended line to a platform on the outer structure, and then rappel down to retrieve their next clue on the sphere's exterior.
- After the first Roadblock, teams found their next clue at St-Viateur Bagel.
- In this season's final Roadblock, the team member who did not perform the previous Roadblock had to stack three orders of Montreal-style bagels on holder sticks in a specific top-to-bottom sequence by variety, three sticks per order. They then had to deliver them on foot, carrying a complete order each time, to three locations in the surrounding neighbourhood of Mile End. If the bagels were not arranged correctly, they would not be accepted. Once all deliveries were successfully completed, racers could return to St-Viateur Bagel and receive their next clue, which directed them to the Moment Factory.
- At the Moment Factory, teams found a flatscreen displaying a map of Canada, Vietnam, and Cuba with the visited cities highlighted and had to place plaques, each containing a phrase heard or read from various sources throughout the season, one per leg, in the corresponding space on the interactive surface. 22 misleading phrases were also included. Once teams correctly filled in all 11 spaces, they received their final clue, which directed them to the finish line at Kondiaronk Belvedere on Mont-Royal.

| Leg | Location | Phrase | Source |
|---|---|---|---|
| 1 | Yellowknife, Northwest Territories | Travel Safely Across the Land | Translated phrase at first task |
| 2 | Calgary, Alberta | Be Part of the Energy | Mayor Nenshi |
| 3 | Cái Bè, Vietnam | Vibrate or Hydrate | Detour clue |
| 4 | Ho Chi Minh City, Vietnam | Make a Wish | Birdcages route marker clue |
| 5 | Prince Rupert, British Columbia | City of Rainbows | Pit Stop greeter |
| 6 | Hamilton, Ontario | Backseat Driver | Roadblock clue |
| 7 | Kingston, Ontario | My Beloved Country | Last line of Roadblock speech |
| 8 | Havana, Cuba | Bluenose Achieved Immortality | Plaque at Bluenose replica |
| 9 | Sydney, Nova Scotia | Blackhouse | Clue after Detour |
| 10 | Saint Andrews, New Brunswick | Who's Teed Off? | Face Off clue |
| 11 | Montreal, Quebec | Who's On the Bubble? | Roadblock clue |

== Ratings ==
Viewership includes initial date of viewing plus seven-day DVR playback.

| No. | Title | Air date | Viewers (millions) | Weekly rank | Ref. |
|---|---|---|---|---|---|
| 1 | "Who's Ready to Let It All Hang Out?" | June 28, 2016 | 2.05 | 1 | |
| 2 | "Deal Guys? Deal! Deal!" | July 5, 2016 | 1.99 | 1 | |
| 3 | "Toads! Are You Kidding Me?" | July 12, 2016 | 1.82 | 2 | |
| 4 | "Shine Your Light" | July 19, 2016 | 1.86 | 2 | |
| 5 | "The Little Blind Tugboat That Could" | July 26, 2016 | 1.95 | 1 | |
| 6 | "Am I Actually Operating the Plane?" | August 2, 2016 | 1.59 | 4 | |
| 7 | "I Could Be Prime Minister" | August 9, 2016 | 1.68 | 3 | |
| 8 | "Top 20 Moments" | August 16, 2016 | N/A | >30 | |
| 9 | "I Just Wanna Win" | August 23, 2016 | 1.79 | 1 | |
| 10 | "For Those About to Rock" | August 30, 2016 | 1.79 | 1 | |
| 11 | "We're Doing It Wrong! We're In Big Trouble" | September 6, 2016 | 1.85 | 1 | |
| 12 | "Second Place Isn't Good Enough" | September 13, 2016 | 2.14 | 1 | |
| 13 | "After The Race" | September 13, 2016 | 0.79 | 21 | |

- Episode 6, "Am I Actually Operating the Plane?", aired during the opening week of the 2016 Summer Olympics.
- Episode 7, "I Could Be Prime Minister", aired during the first full week of the 2016 Summer Olympics.
