= Louisbourg Lighthouse Trail =

Hiking trail in Nova Scotia, Canada

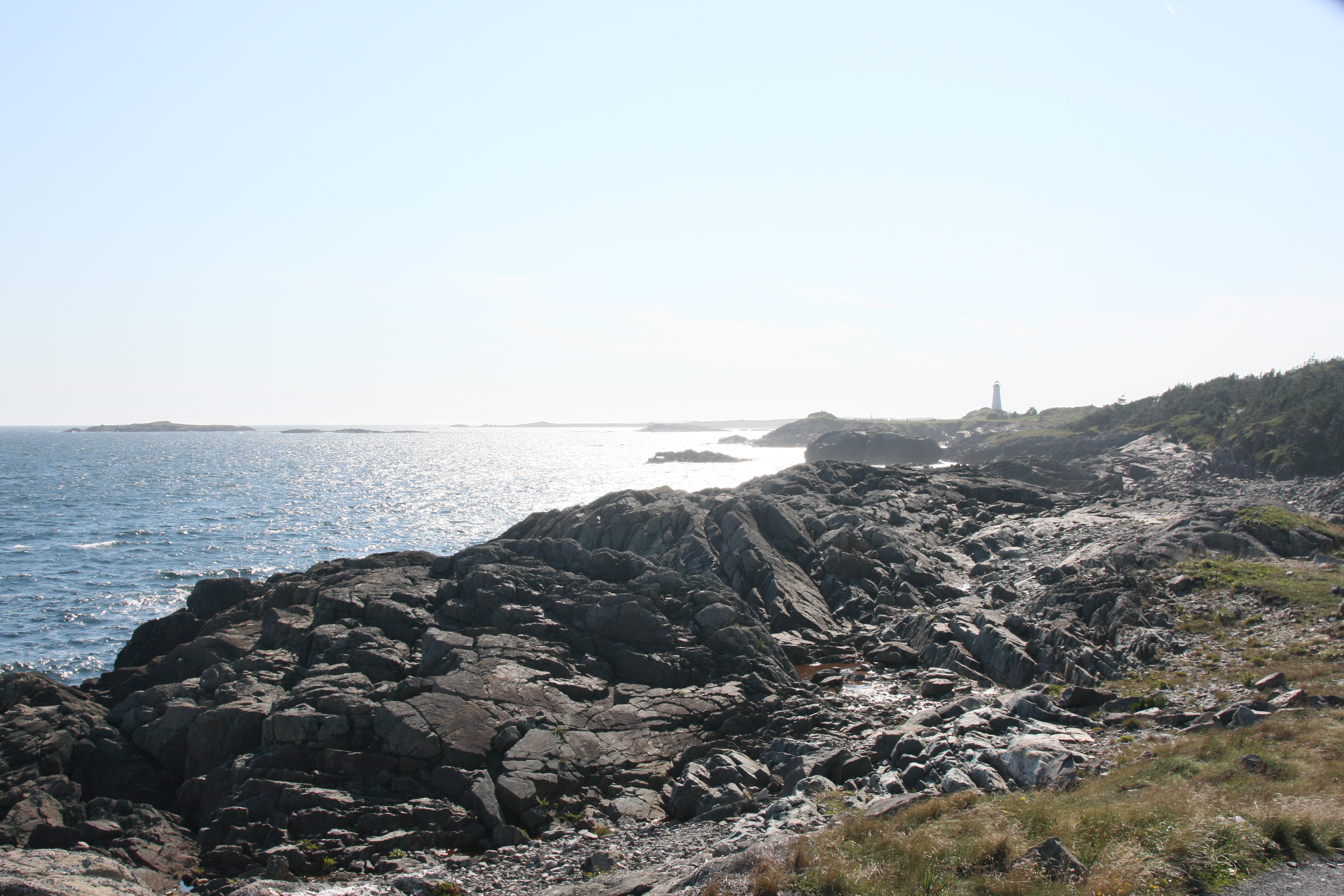
- View from Louisbourg Lighthouse Trail
- Length: About 2 kilometres (1.2 mi) on loop trail, 3 kilometres (1.9 mi) further to lookoff at Loraine Head.
- Location: Fortress of Louisbourg National Historic Site
- Trailheads: Louisbourg Lighthouse - 45° 54'24.1"N, 59° 57' 30.5"W (N45.9067, W59.9585)
- Use: Hiking
- Difficulty: Easy to strenuous
- Season: Year round
- Sights: Atlantic Ocean, Cabot Strait
- Hazards: Severe weather Tick-borne diseases Mosquitos; Biting flies
- Surface: Loop Trail - Crushed stone, wood; Coastal Trail - natural surface, rock
- Maintainer: Coastal Connections Trail Association
- Website: Louisbourg Lighthouse Trail Facebook Page

Louisbourg Lighthouse Coastal Trail on Cape Breton Island's southeast coast, in Nova Scotia

The Louisbourg Lighthouse Trail is a hiking trail on Cape Breton Island in the Canadian province of Nova Scotia. The trailhead is located on Lighthouse Point, at the Louisbourg Lighthouse, within the Fortress of Louisbourg National Historic Site. The Louisbourg Lighthouse is the site of Canada’s first lighthouse which was built here in 1734.

== Trail history ==
People have been traversing this coastline for decades so a narrow but well-worn foot path was present along this shore connecting Lighthouse Point to the community of Big Lorraine. A local non-profit society, the Coastal Connections Trail Association, began work on improving the trail around 2008. With the first section completed they held an opening ceremony in June 2010. The volunteer association continues to maintain the trail.

== Trail outline ==
=== Loop Trail ===
The first part of the trail is suitable for visitors of all skill levels. It begins at the parking area at Lighthouse Point and follows the ocean coast to the east as a 2 kilometres (1 mi) hard-packed gravel partial loop trail. Along this part of the trail are a number of interpretive panels explaining the area's historical significance and natural features including its geography, flora and fauna. There are benches to rest along the trail, as well as lookoffs in strategic places. Sections of the trail, where it passes over a fen and other wet ground are constructed as an elevated wooden boardwalk. The trail is accessible to power wheelchairs and children in strollers and wide enough for two to walk abreast. Pets are permitted on the trail but must be leashed and managed by their owners. There are a number of small side paths branching off along this part of the trail, such as the one that gives access to the top of Lighthouse Cliff for an expansive view. The trail follows the coast past Lighthouse Cove, Crows Roost, Morningstar Cove and continues to Western Gun Landing Cove Head where it loops back around toward the start.

=== Hurricane Fiona September 2022 ===
On September 24th 2022 Hurricane Fiona devastated Cape Breton with high winds and substantial rainfall. Many of the sections of the trail were damaged with portions of the boardwalk being damaged or washed out to sea. The rebuilt trail was reopened in October 2024 no longer using boardwalks. Sections of the abandoned boardwalk can still be seen along the rebuilt trail.

=== Coastal Trail ===
Beyond the loop is a more challenging trail that continues east along Gun Landing Cove beach where British besiegers of Fortress Louisbourg landed artillery. Along the edge of the shore here are the remains of French entrenchments from 1758. This rugged section of the trail is narrower and has natural surfaces; it is wet in places, sturdy footwear is recommended. Parts of this section of the trail also have smaller sections of boardwalk or bridges to pass over some of the wet areas. The trail then continues into the woods past Eastern Gun Landing Cove Head to Brook Landing Cove (also known as Wolf's Cove) where General James Wolfe's forces set up camp along the Freshwater Brook running down to the cove, as a base for the attack on the fortress's Island Battery. From here the trail rounds Big Cove, then progresses further east 3 kilometres (2 mi) past Hammer Head Cove and Hammer Head, and Moneyhunters Cove, to a lookoff at Lorraine Head.

Past the lookoff a very rugged informal trail continues a further 3 kilometres (2 mi) east to the coastal village of Big Lorraine. This section is recommended for avid hikers.

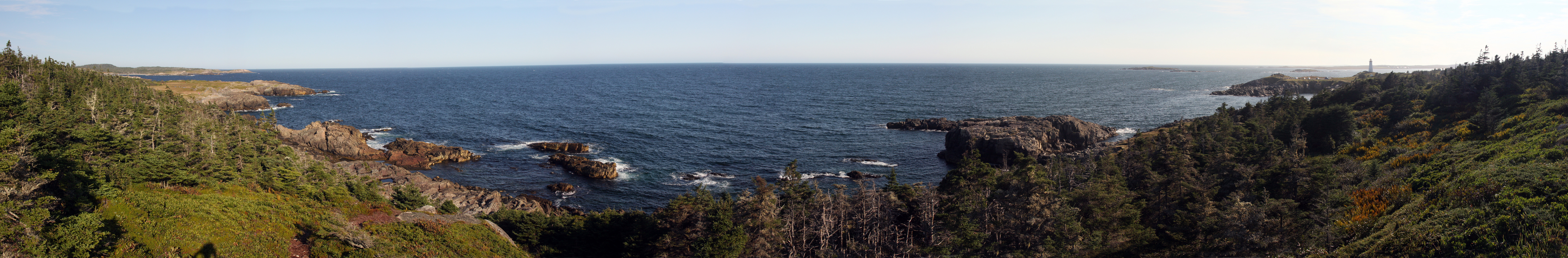
Morningstar Cove. Lorraine Head far off to the east (to the left), then Gun Landing Cove and Western Gun Landing Cove Head, also to the east. Morningstar Cove next to that in the left half of the photo. Lighthouse Cove to the west to the right side of the photo, followed by Louisbourg Lighthouse further to the right with the Fortress of Louisbourg in the distance beyond the lighthouse.

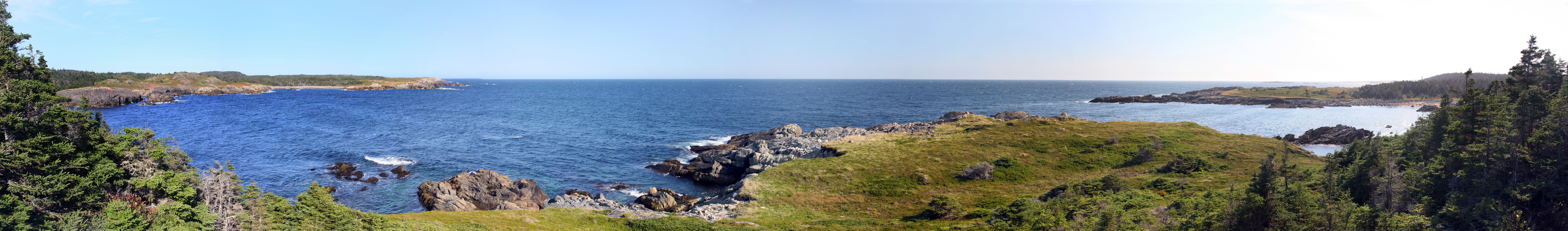
A view from Eastern Gun Landing Cove Head. Looking toward Hammer Head off to the east (left in photo). Then Big Cove and Brook Landing Cove (also known as Wolf's Cove) with Eastern Gun Landing Cove head in the photo centre. Gun Landing Cove and Western Gun Landing Cove Head to the west. Louisboug Lighthouse and the islands in the entrance to Louisbourg Harbour can be seen off to the west (far right) in the distance.

== Trail access ==
To reach the Lighthouse Trail from Sydney, travel Trunk #22 to Louisbourg, as you enter the town, take the first left turn onto Havenside Road. Stay on Havenside Road until the road ends at the lighthouse parking area. The trail head is at the far end of the parking area, at 45° 54′ 24.1″ N, 59° 57′ 30.5″ W (45.906694, -59.958472).
