= Crosby's Molasses =

Canadian molasses company

Crosby’s Molasses
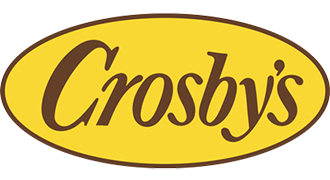
- Industry: Molasses
- Founded: 1879; 147 years ago
- Founder: Lorenzo George Crosby
- Headquarters: Saint John, New Brunswick, Canada
- Area served: Atlantic Canada
- Products: Molasses
- Website: crosbys.com

Crosby's Molasses is a molasses importing and exporting company based in Atlantic Canada. Started in 1879 in Yarmouth, Nova Scotia, the company is now headquartered in Saint John, New Brunswick.

In March 2023, Crosby's received a $800,000 investment from the provincial and federal governments.

== History ==
Crosby's, originally established in 1879 by Lorenzo George Crosby, began as a grocery business in Yarmouth, Nova Scotia. At the age of 20, Lorenzo ventured into the importing and exporting industry, where he exported fish and lumber to the West Indies. In return, he received barrels of valuable, fancy molasses, thus laying the foundation for Crosby's Molasses. This molasses would be distributed to retail businesses across Eastern Canada.

Lorenzo later moved in 1897 to Saint John, New Brunswick, where his business remains today. Initially moving to Nelson Street, he later relocated to what is now Rothesay Avenue in 1911 to allow for more space.

In 2021, Crosby's Molasses partnered with a local newcomer centre to recruit immigrants to Saint John with a job.
