= North Pacific Cannery National Historic Site =

Coordinates: 54.1944°N 130.2248°W

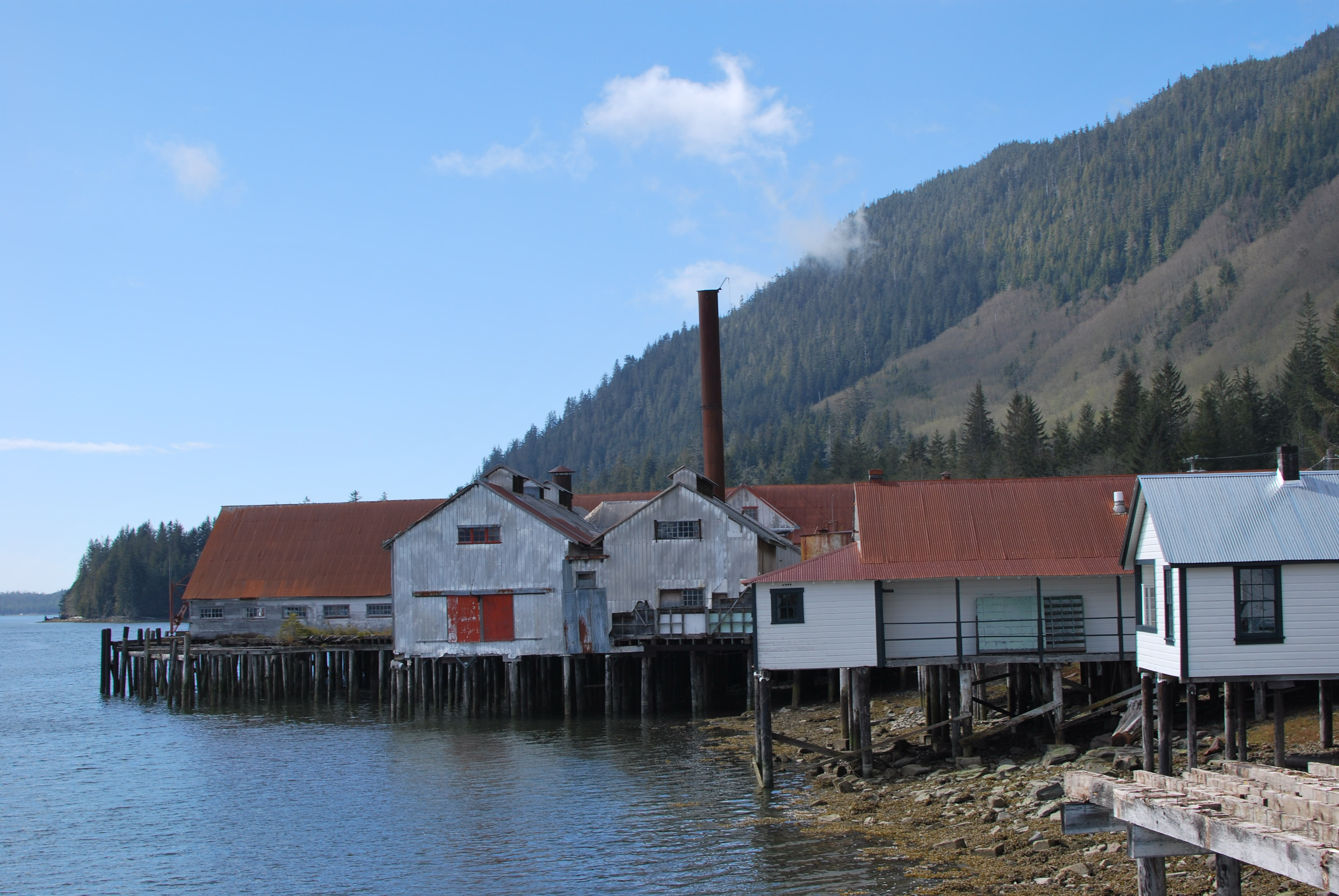
North Pacific Cannery

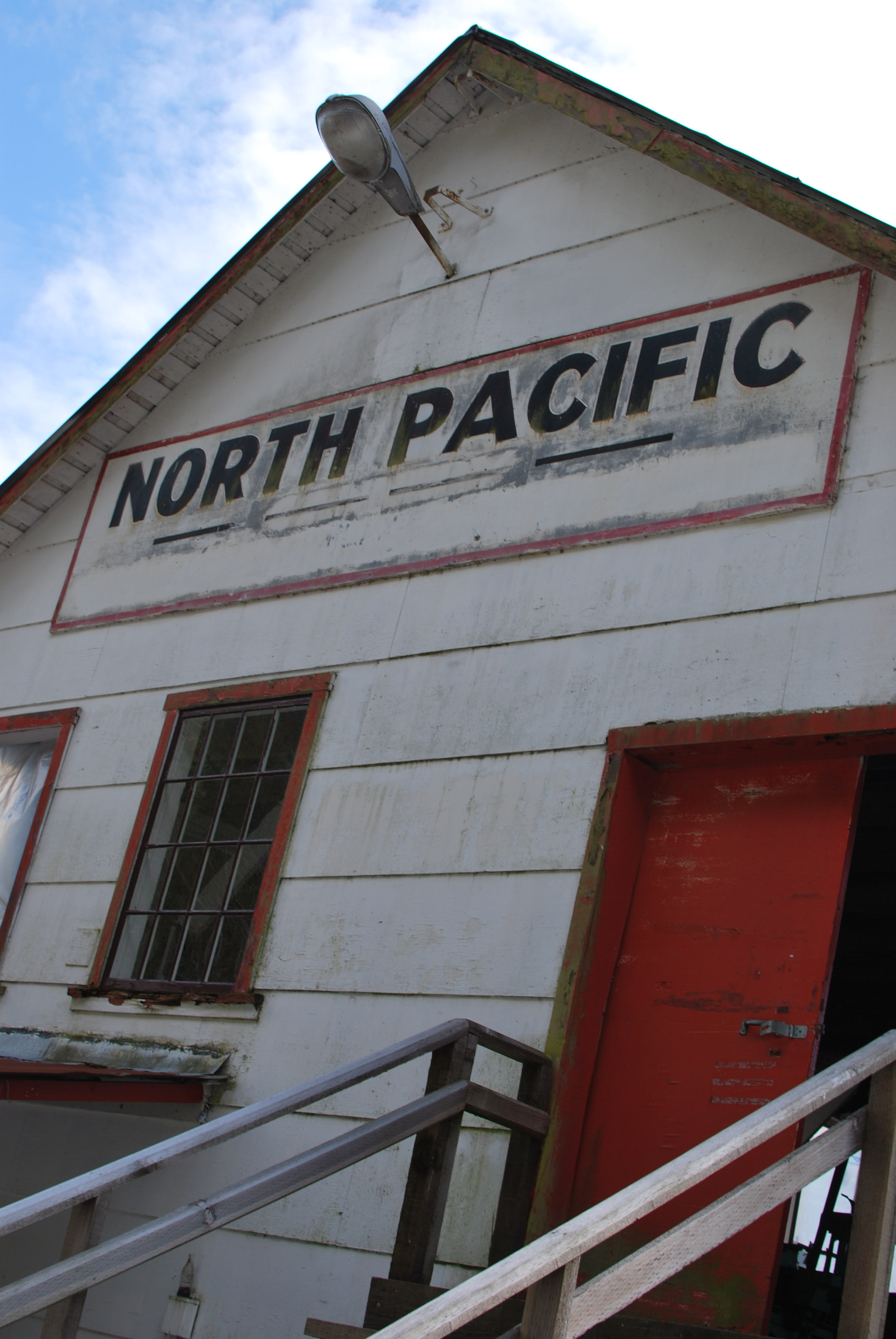
North Pacific Cannery Sign

The North Pacific Cannery (NPC) located near Port Edward, British Columbia, Canada, is one of the longest standing canneries in the Port Edward area. NPC was founded in 1889 by Angus Rutherford Johnston, John Alexander Carthew, and Alexander Gilmore McCandless. The plant stopped processing salmon in 1968, becoming a reduction plant until its closure in 1981 after 80 years of operations.

== NPC Museum ==
The North Pacific Cannery was built at the mouth of the Skeena River on “Cannery Row”. The 183 acres of land was purchased for $32 by Carthew. In order for the North Coast Marine Museum Society to preserve NPC, it had to receive funds up to $4 million, which was succeeded by the canneries 100th anniversary in 1989. NPC has 25 buildings that can be toured, including a visitor centre, canning loft, First Nations and Japanese bunk houses, European house, and the Mess House, which has been turned into a small café.

== Timeline of NPC ==
Year	Event
1888	North Pacific Canning Company Ltd formed
1889	John Alex Carthew received a crown grant to purchase 183 acres for $32 in December
1891	Carthew sold plant to Henry Ogle Bell-Irving
1892	Bell-Irving sold plant to Anglo-British Columbia Packing Company Ltd.
1892	“The Big Slide”- A landslide destroys First Nations housing killing at least nine people
1900	One-line cannery
1908/1909	First Nation and Chinese worker housing removed for the Grand Trunk Pacific Railway
1908/1909	First Nation housing moved to pillars over the Skeena River, while Chinese housing was moved close to the mountains
1910	Cold storage plant created
1914	Grand Trunk Railway (GTR) completed linking NPC and other canneries to the nation
1914	GTR now referred to as The Canadian National Railway
1918	Can making factory created; created and supplied cans to other canneries in the surrounding area
1920	Mild Cure plant closed
1923	Two-line plant. Powered by steam, water, gasoline and fuel oil
1936	Can making factory closed
1937	Reform lines installed; flat cans are turning into cylinder shapes and given top and bottoms
1954	Cold storage dismantled
1955	Reduction plant installed; creating fish meal and fish oil
1959	Road built along the Skeena River linking NPC and other canneries to Highway 16
1966	NPC becomes a part of the Village of Port Edward
1968	Final year of canning salmon
1969	The Canadian Fishing Company Ltd. become new owners of NPC in January
1972	One canning line restored for one season due to fire destroying Canadian Fishing Company in Prince Rupert
1979	North Coast Marine Museum Society formed; created in order to sponsor the restoration of NPC
1980	British Columbia Packers Ltd. purchase NPC plant
1981	NPC Plant closed
1985	Reduction plant machines are shipped to Mexico
1985	North Pacific Cannery designated a National Historic Site
1987	On July 7 ownership transferred from BC Packers to Village of Port Edward

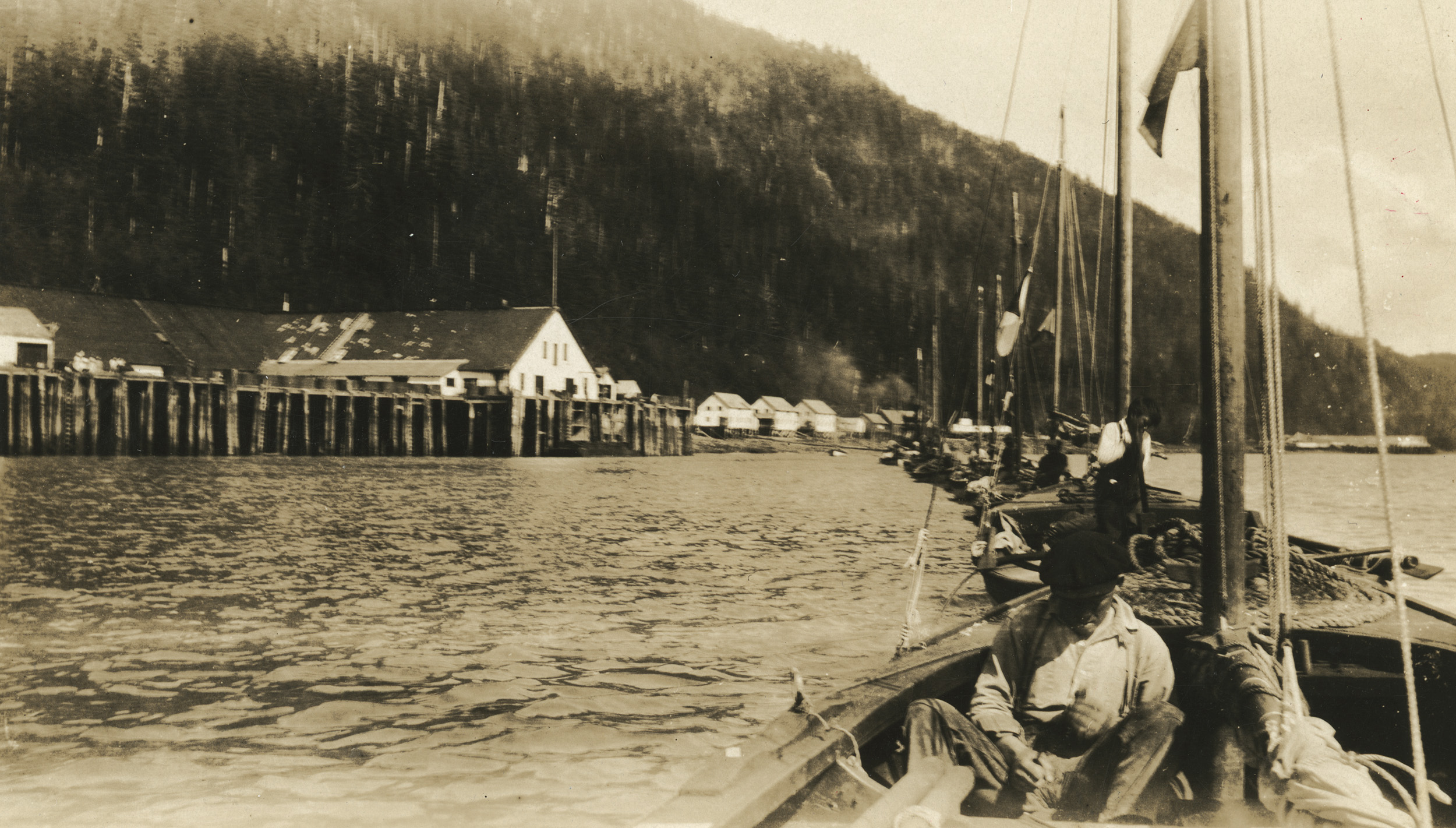
Ocean view of NPC

== The North Coast Marine Museum Society ==
In 1979, five local Port Edward community members formed The North Coast Marine Museum Society in order to save the North Pacific Cannery. NPC was not the first cannery looked at. Inverness Cannery, located next to NPC, was considered initially in 1973 but a fire destroyed the plant causing the Board of Directors to move the plans onto NPC. The North Coast Marine Museum Society originally started as The North Coast Fishing Exhibit which displayed artifacts from the fishing communities in a donated space in the Prince Rupert, Pride O' The North Mall. In September 1985 the North Coast Marine Museum Society moved all of their artifacts to the cannery. In 1987 the BC Packers handed over the keys to the North Pacific Cannery and by gifting the cannery $840,000 and $10,000 worth contribution for the restoration of the plant, NPC was declared a national historic site in 1989.
