= Prince Rupert City Hall =

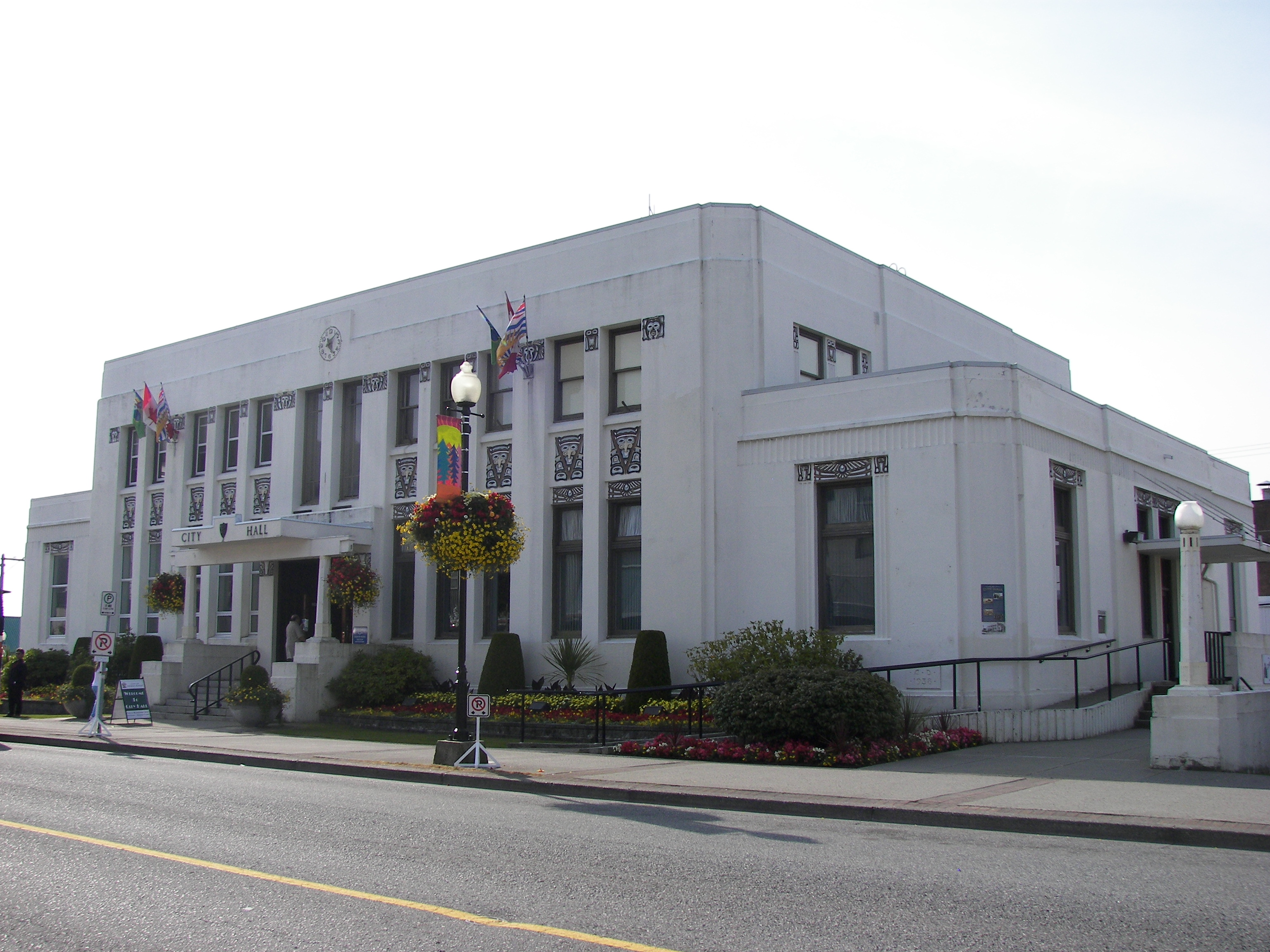
- Prince Rupert City Hall
- Interactive map of the Prince Rupert City Hall area

General information
- Architectural style: Art Deco
- Location: 424 3rd Avenue West; Prince Rupert, British Columbia; V8J 1L7
- Coordinates: 54.31268°N 130.32541°W
- Client: Department of Public Works

Technical details
- Floor count: 2

Design and construction
- Architect: Max B. Downing

The art deco Prince Rupert City Hall, in Prince Rupert, British Columbia, was originally constructed as the Federal Building in 1938.

The architect was Max B. Downing who persuaded the Department of Public Works to use "monolithic concrete" on the edifice instead of brick.

It was built in the fashionable art deco streamlined style; many years later decorative native motifs were incorporated into the front wall.

It is one of only 2 existing Art Deco city halls in Canada; the other being Vancouver City Hall.
