= Louisbourg Lighthouse =

Lighthouse in Nova Scotia, Canada

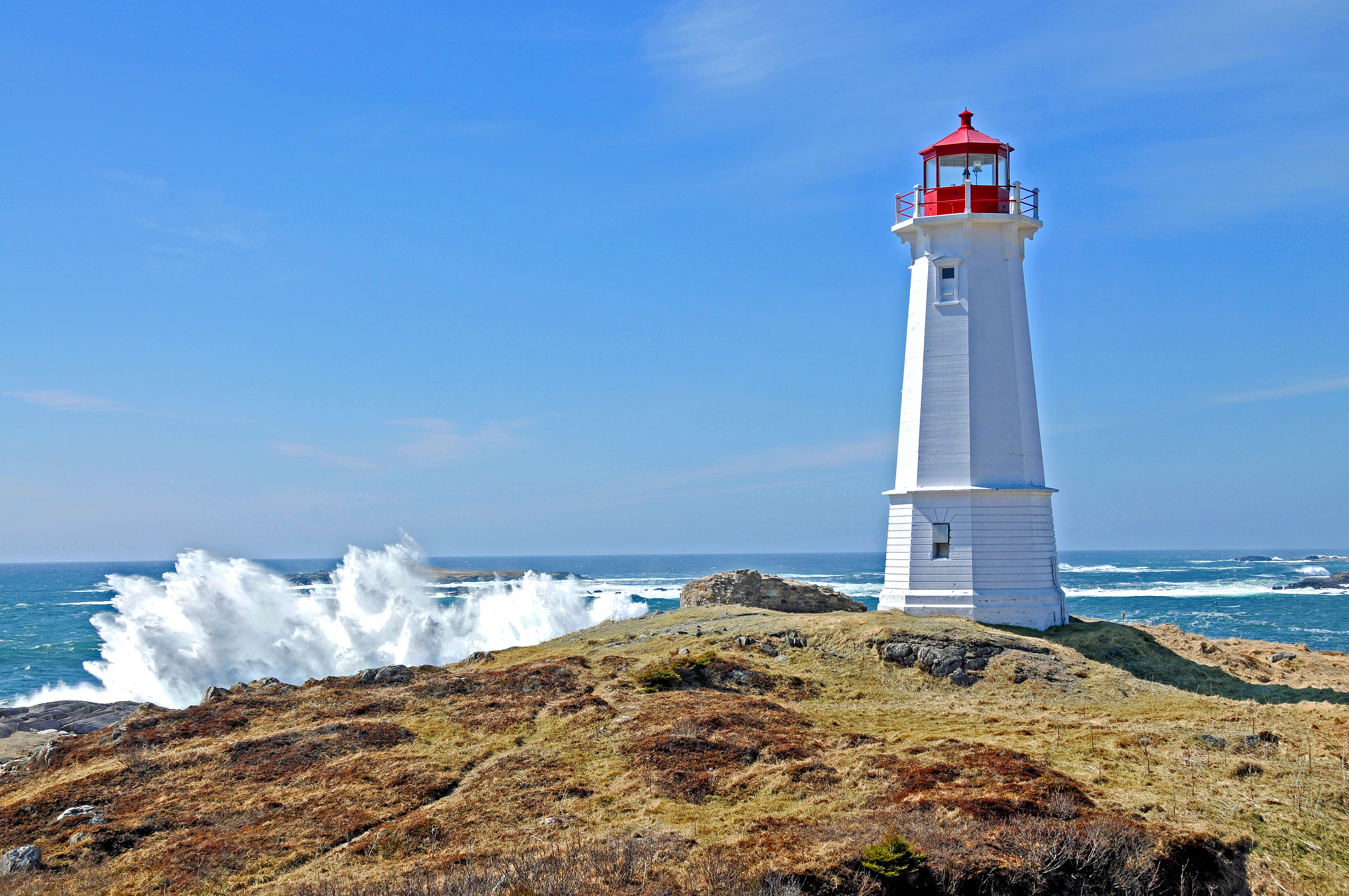
- Location: Louisbourg, Nova Scotia
- Coordinates: 45°54′24.1″N 59°57′30.5″W

Tower
- Constructed: 1734 (first); 1738 (second); 1842 (third)
- Construction: concrete tower
- Automated: 1990
- Height: 16.8 m (55 ft) (current); 16.5 metres (54 ft) (first); 17 metres (56 ft) (second)
- Shape: octagonal tower with balcony and lantern
- Markings: white tower, red lantern
- Operator: Louisbourg Lighthouse Society
- Heritage: recognized federal heritage building of Canada

Light
- First lit: 1923 (current)
- Deactivated: 1758-1842
- Focal height: 32 m (105 ft)
- Range: 16 nautical miles (30 km; 18 mi)
- Characteristic: Fl W 15s.

Louisbourg Lighthouse is an active Canadian lighthouse in Louisbourg, Nova Scotia. The current tower is the fourth in a series of lighthouses that have been built on the site, the earliest was the first lighthouse in Canada.

== The first lighthouse ==
Construction began on the lighthouse in 1730 to assist navigation to Fortress of Louisbourg. It was completed in 1734. A fire in 1736 destroyed the lantern but the stone tower was unharmed and a new lantern was installed in 1738. Lighthouse Point played a decisive role in both the Siege of 1745 and 1758 as, once captured, it provided a commanding gun battery location to bombard the fortress. This lighthouse was badly damaged in 1758 during the Final Siege of Louisbourg and abandoned by the British after they demolished the fortress. Stonework ruins from the first tower are still visible at the site.

== The second lighthouse ==
A square wooden lighthouse with a black stripe was built by the government of Nova Scotia in 1842. The lighthouse was a large 2 1/2-story wooden building supported by a massive masonry base. It included the keeper's dwelling in the base of the light. A fog horn building was added in 1902. This lighthouse was destroyed by fire in 1922. The foundation remains visible today and has been excavated and stabilized by Parks Canada archaeologists.

== The lighthouse today ==
An octagonal concrete lighthouse decorated with neoclassical architectural features was built in 1923. The tower is a twin of the Georges Island Lighthouse in Halifax, Nova Scotia. The Louisbourg lighthouse was destaffed in 1990. The lighthouse is a popular lookoff point and in 2008 became the start of a coastal walking trail, the Louisbourg Lighthouse Trail. Interpretive plaques mark the ruins of the previous lighthouses.

== See also ==
- List of lighthouses in Canada
