= Jasper Skytram =

Aerial tramway in Canada

Jasper SkyTram
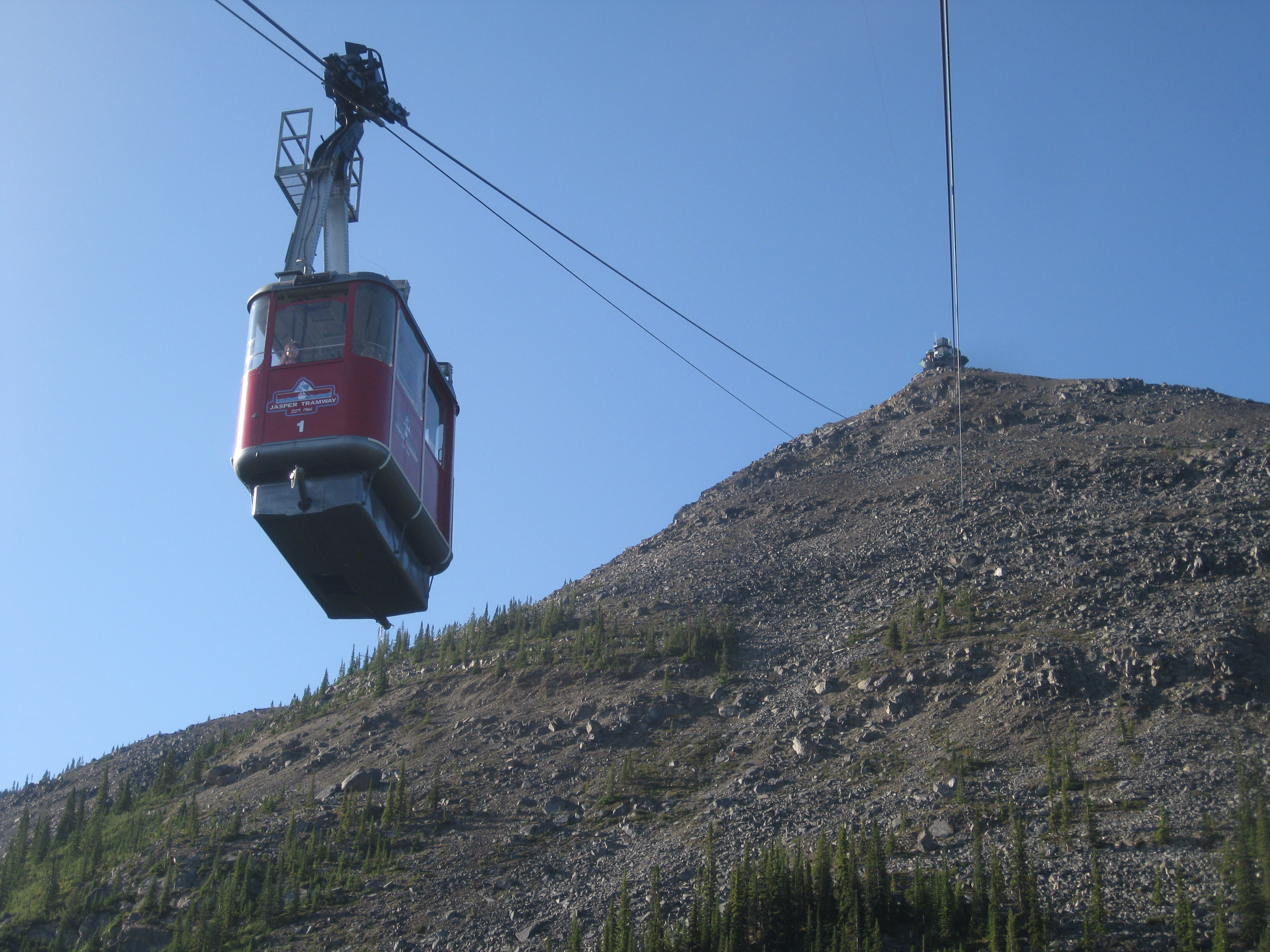
- The Jasper SkyTram from below in 2009

- Location within Alberta

Overview
- Status: Operational
- Character: Recreational
- Location: Whistlers Road, Jasper, Alberta
- Country: Canada
- Coordinates: 52.85147°N 118.12375°W
- Open: 1964; 62 years ago
- Website: www.banffjaspercollection.com/attractions/jasper-skytram/

Operation
- Owner: Pursuit
- Trip duration: 7 min

Technical features
- Aerial lift type: Aerial tramway
- Manufactured by: P.H.B. Company
- No. of support towers: 1
- No. of cables: 2
- Cable diameter: Track rope cable: 46 mm. Hauling rope: 27 mm.
- Operating speed: 6 m/s

The Jasper SkyTram is an aerial tramway on the mountain called The Whistlers near Jasper, Alberta, Canada. It is 7 kilometres (4.3 mi) south of Jasper, off the Icefields Parkway on Whistlers Road. It is a seasonal operation, running from late March to the end of October. It is the highest and longest guided aerial tramway in Canada. It goes to a height of 2,263 metres (7,425 ft) above sea level with a travel time of around 7 minutes.

From the upper tramway station, the hike to Whistlers Summit is 1.3 kilometres (0.81 mi), with 225-metre (738 ft) elevation gain.

== History ==
It has been in operation since it was built in 1964 by William McGregor and Norm Gustavson, with engineering by John Ogilvy. The facilities were purchased by Toby and Judy Rayner in 1979, and stayed in the Rayner family until 2012. Over the years, many improvements to the stations, cars, and systems were made.

The Rayners were bought out in 2012 by RMSI-JTAC Equipment Holdings, the company that owns Marmot Basin ski area. In January 2025, Pursuit completed acquisition of the Jasper SkyTram and a long term Parks Canada lease for CAD 23.7 million.
