= Highland Village Museum/An Clachan Gàidhealach =

Outdoor museum in Nova Scotia, Canada

Coordinates: 45.948°N 60.819°W

The Highland Village Museum / Baile nan Gàidheal / An Clachan Gàidhealaich is an outdoor living history museum dedicated to Nova Scotia’s Gaelic folk-life, culture, and language. Highland Village is located in Iona, Nova Scotia, Canada, on 43 acres of natural landscape overlooking the Bras d'Or Lake in Central Cape Breton.

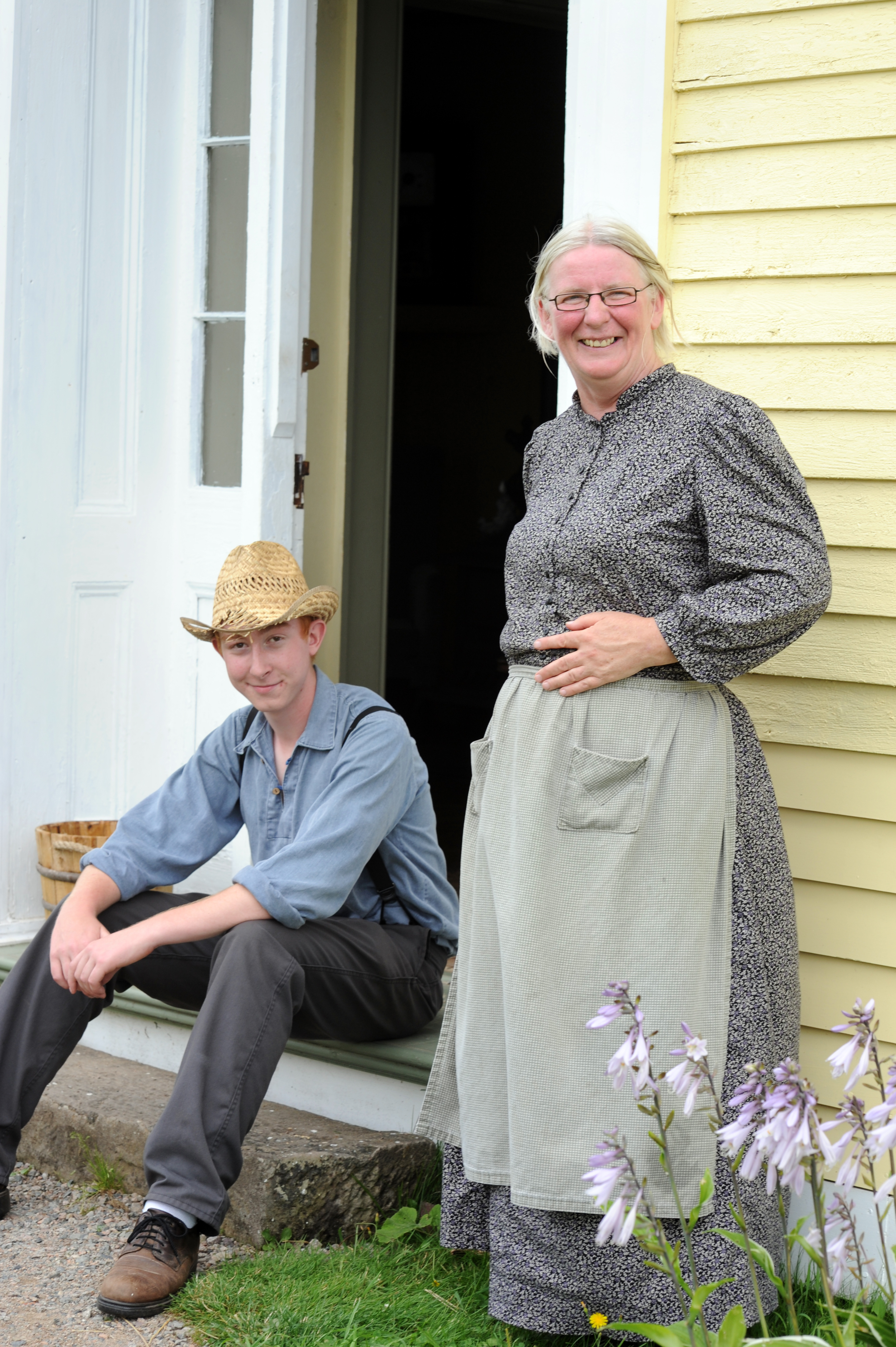
Highland Village Museum costumed animators ready to welcome visitors

== History ==
The roots of Gaelic Nova Scotia are found in the Highlands and Islands of Scotland where significant socio-economic changes in the 18th century disrupted a pastoral life-style. These changes prompted many to emigrate to Nova Scotia.

Throughout the late 18th and early 19th centuries, thousands of Scots settled in eastern Nova Scotia. Through a pattern of chain emigration, settlers often chose to create new communities based on family connections, religious or political beliefs. The settlers faced new hardships such as a vastly different climate, however they persevered and began clearing land, building homes and outbuildings, cultivating their land and establishing new lives and communities.

== Interpretation and collections ==
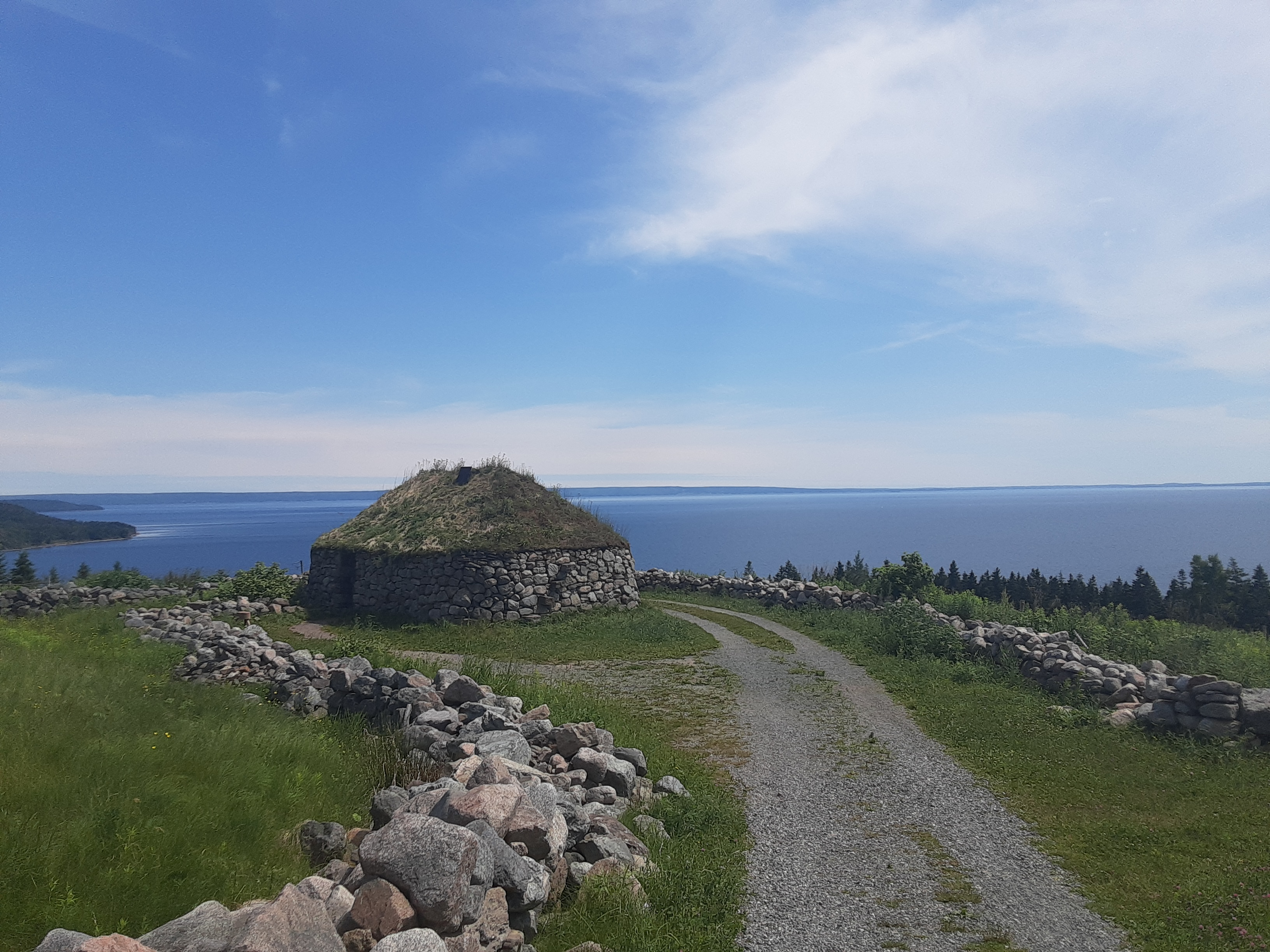
Stone House meant to represent Gaelic Scotland from 1770-1830s

Highland Village Museum depicts 4 distinct eras in the history of Nova Scotia’s Gaelic settlers. Gàidhealtachd na h-Albann, Gaelic Scotland 1770-1830s is depicted in the Black House (an Taigh dubh). Coille Mhór na h-Albann Nuaih, The Forests of Nova Scotia 1770-1850s is depicted in the Log House (an Taigh Logaichean), the Centre Chimney House (Taigh an t-Similer), and the Barn (an Sabal). A’ Stéidheachadh Gàidhealtachd Ùireadh, Building New Communities 1850s – 1880s, is depicted by the Church (an Eaglais) and the Centre Hallway House (Taigh na Tranna). Gàidhealtachd na h-Albann Nuaidh, Gaelic Nova Scotia 1880s – 1920s, is depicted and interpreted through the School House (an Taigh-sgoil), the General Store (an Taigh-marsantachd), the Forge (a’Cheàrdach), the Carding Mill (am Muileann-càrdaidh) and the Turn of the Century house (Taigh tùs na Ficheadamh Lìn).

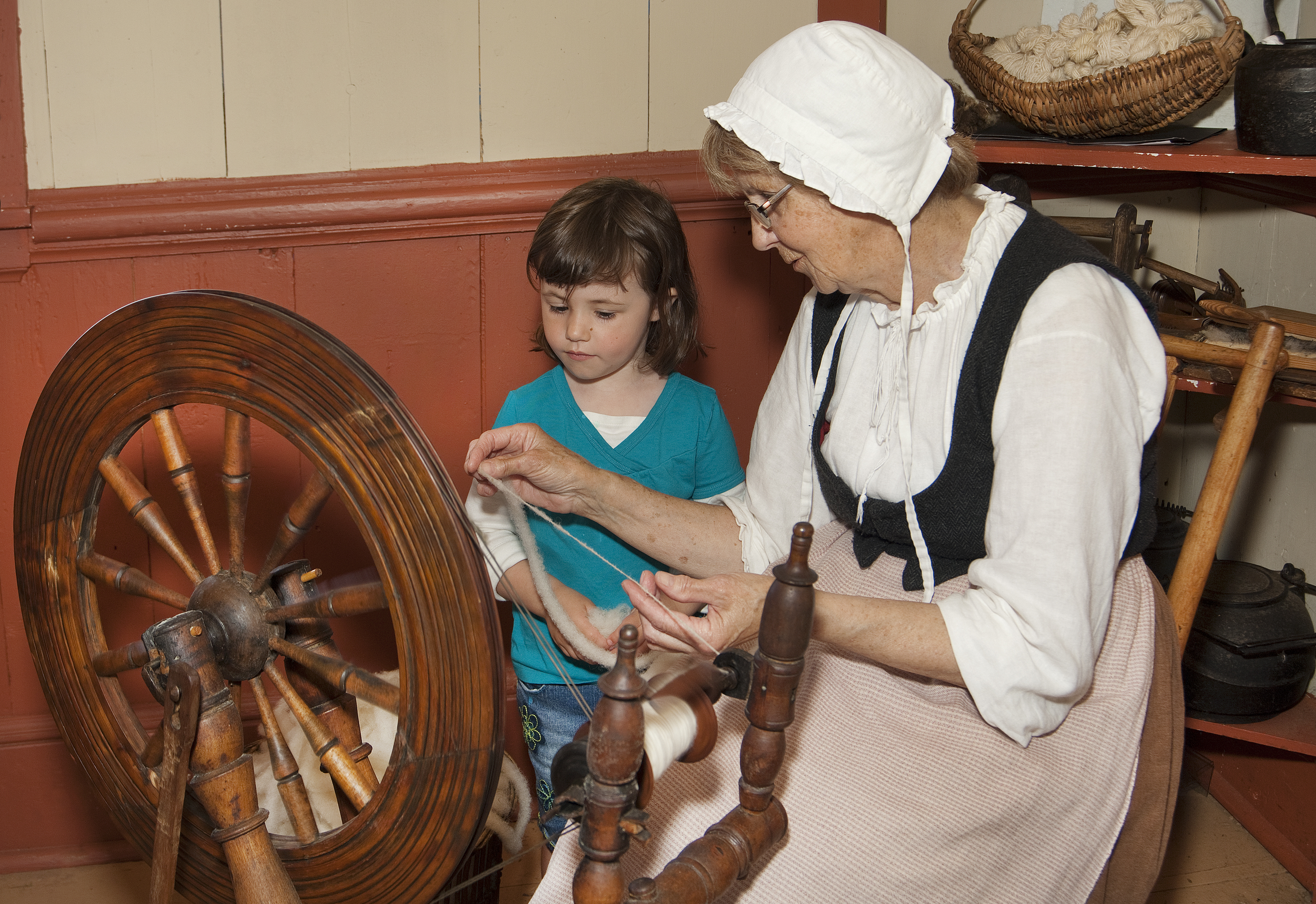
Highland Village Museum Spinning Wool

Visitors to Highland Village explore these 4 distinct eras of Nova Scotia’s Gaelic history while interacting with costumed animators throughout the historic buildings. The interpretation of this aspect of Nova Scotia’s history is enhanced by the inclusion of farm animals, traditional gardening and farming techniques, and other aspects of the life of the Gaels in this part of the world. The artifacts that make up the collection of the Highland Village Museum are carefully chosen to best represent the specific era they are reflecting. All artifacts at Highland Village are part of the Nova Scotia Museum Collection.

A virtual museum site entitled Cape Breton Céilidh has been created which provides a brief look at the history of the Gaels in Nova Scotia and the cultural legacy they created.

== Gaelic cultural promotion ==
Highland Village Museum / An Clachan Gàidhealach offers programs and events designed to promote Gaelic language, culture and heritage. Through partnerships with other like-minded community groups, and government agencies, the Highland Village Museum and Nova Scotia highland Village Society is able to host educational programs such as Stòras a’ Bhaile, a four-day Gaelic immersion folk-life school for advanced Nova Scotia Gaelic learners, among others learning opportunities.

Highland Village Museum hosts an annual Highland Village Day outdoor Scottish Concert each August. Highland Village day began in 1962 as both a celebration of the beginnings of creating the Highland Village Museum, and as a fundraiser for further development. Opening day included an exhibit of boxing put on by the New Waterford Boxing Club. This annual tradition showcases local musicians who are continuing the musical traditions passed down through their ancestors.

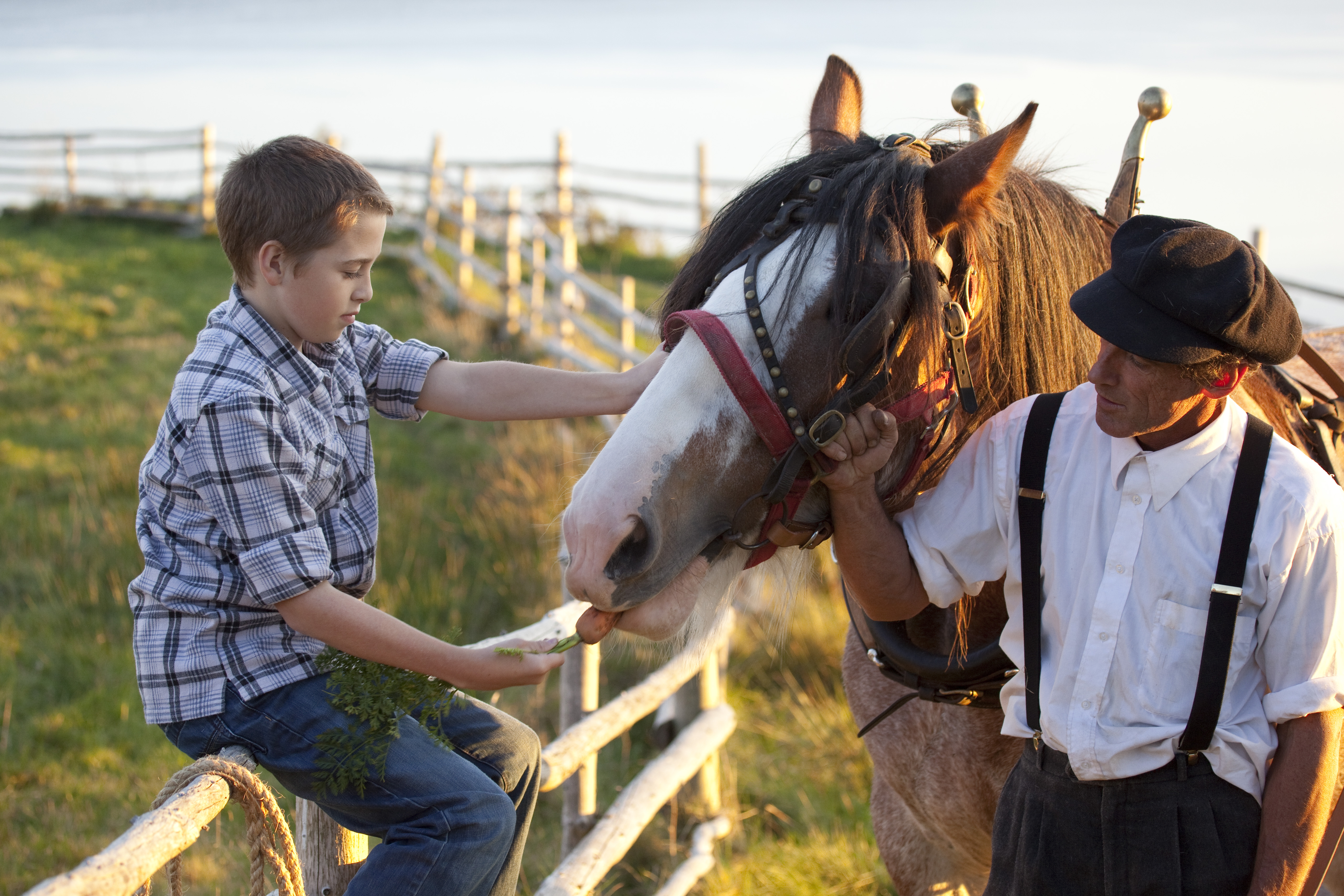
Meeting up with a horse coming in from the fields

Other programs and events held annually include Pioneer Day, a traditional cod-fish supper, educational programs for youth, as well as the regular interpretive programming available on site daily. Highland Village offers an in-class visitation program to local schools entitled Sgadan’s Buntata which provides opportunities for students to see, and interact with, demonstrations of crafts performed by staff in period dress. In addition to being made aware of the material culture of Gaelic Nova Scotia, students experience an introduction to the Gaels’ language and customs.

== Roots Cape Breton Genealogy & Family History Centre ==
Roots Cape Breton is a computer-assisted service for those researching people from the area. It contains data extracted from census, cemetery, birth, marriage and death records, as well as other sources of information.

== An Drochaid Eadarainn ==
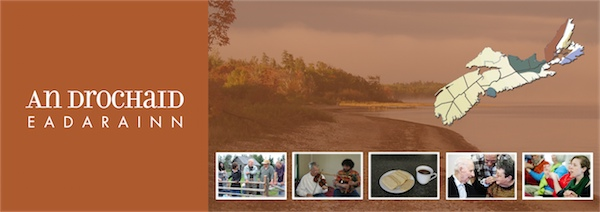
An Drochaid Eadarainn

The Highland Village Museum has developed an interactive website, An Drochaid Eadarainn (The Bridge Between Us), to emulate the social transmission of Gaelic language and culture through technology. Its purpose is to contribute to Gaelic renewal initiatives in Nova Scotia and other Canadian locales. The official launch took place on 2 May 2012 at a ceremony in the foyer of the Nova Scotia Legislature Province House in Halifax.

Communicating recorded expressions of Nova Scotia Gaelic culture, the site exposes visitors to native speakers through storytelling, music and dance, dialectal samples, kinship, belief, traditional foods, home remedies and cures. Participants can meet, share and exchange Nova Scotia Gaelic traditions on An Drochaid Bheò (The Living Bridge), an interactive feature of the website. The site attempts to showcase Gaelic speech and cultural expression across many regions in the province.
