= List of historic places in Inverness County, Nova Scotia =

Inverness County is a historical county and census division in the Canadian province of Nova Scotia. This list compiles historic places recognized by the Canadian Register of Historic Places within the county.

== List of historic places ==
Name	Address	Coordinates	Government recognition (CRHP №)	Wikidata ID	Image
Big Intervale United Church	3207 East Big Intervale Road; Kingross, Margaree Valley NS	46°26′41″N 60°55′09″W	Kingross, Margaree Valley municipality (8851)	Q137291913	Upload Photo
Campbell Heritage House	340 Church Road; Strathlorne NS	46°10′39″N 61°17′12″W	Nova Scotia (8229), Strathlorne municipality (11878)	Q137292009	Upload Photo
Haus Treuburg	175 Main Street; Port Hood NS	46°00′54″N 61°31′51″W	Port Hood municipality (15307)	Q137292143	Upload Photo
Inverness Railway Station	62 Lower Railway Street; Inverness NS	46°13′52″N 61°18′33″W	Inverness municipality (11859)	Q123382220	More images
Jubilee United Church	179 Beach Road; Port Hood Island NS	46°00′59″N 61°33′49″W	Port Hood Island municipality (15166)	Q137292199	Upload Photo
Judique on the Floor Historical Society Building	5663 Highway 19; Judique NS	45°53′11″N 61°29′24″W	Judique municipality (15165)	Q137292253	Upload Photo
Lighttower	Henry Island; Port Hood NS	45°58′36″N 61°35′59″W	Federal (9624)	Q137292290	Upload Photo
Mabou Lighthouse	McKeens Point NS	46°05′13″N 61°28′19″W	Federal (4221)	Q30014299	More images
MacDonald House	356 Smithville Road; Glendyer NS	46°05′15″N 61°20′58″W	Glendyer municipality (12059)	Q137292331	Upload Photo
Robert and Lucinda MacDonald House	14860 Highway 19; Strathlorne NS	46°11′23″N 61°17′14″W	Strathlorne municipality (15308)	Q137292378	Upload Photo
MacFarlane House	1517 Mull River Road; Mull River NS	46°00′17″N 61°21′34″W	Mull River municipality (15334)	Q137292430	Upload Photo
MacKeen-Smith House	11247 Highway 19; Mabou NS	46°03′58″N 61°24′15″W	Mabou municipality (12206)	Q137292482	Upload Photo
MacMillan-Cameron House	15726 Central Avenue; Highway 19; Inverness NS	46°13′36″N 61°18′30″W	Nova Scotia (6529), Inverness municipality (8846)	Q137292539	Upload Photo
Orangedale Railway Station	1428 Orangedale Road; Orangedale NS	45°54′02″N 61°05′38″W	Orangedale municipality (11800)	Q136801819	More images
Paroisse Saint-Pierre	15 119 Cabot Trail; Cheticamp NS	46°37′29″N 61°00′57″W	Nova Scotia (7257), Cheticamp municipality (8821)	Q3583701	More images
Saint Joseph's Roman Catholic Church	5621 Marble Mountain Road; Marble Mountain NS	45°49′13″N 61°02′29″W	Marble Mountain municipality (8735)	Q137292496	More images
Saint Margaret of Scotland Catholic Church	3080 River Denys Road; Glendale NS	45°52′02″N 61°18′17″W	Glendale municipality (11847)	Q137292505	Upload Photo
Peter Smyth House	342 Main Street; Port Hood NS	46°01′14″N 61°32′03″W	Nova Scotia (3894), Port Hood municipality (8734)	Q137292515	Upload Photo

== See also ==
- List of historic places in Nova Scotia
- List of National Historic Sites of Canada in Nova Scotia
- Heritage Property Act (Nova Scotia)
