= Nova Scotia Trunk 19 =

Highway in Nova Scotia, Canada

Trunk 19
- Ceilidh Trail
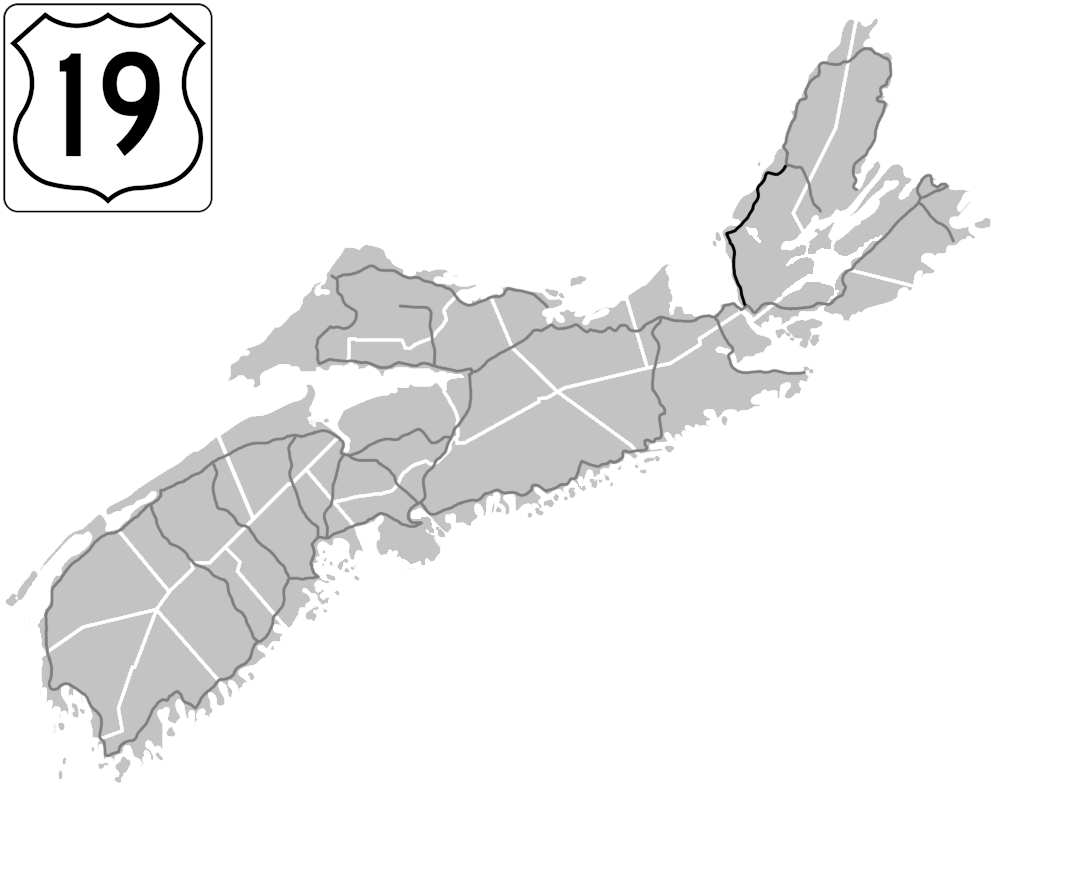

Route information
- Maintained by Department of Transportation and Infrastructure Renewal
- Length: 106.6 km (66.2 mi)

Major junctions
- West end: Hwy 104 (TCH) / Hwy 105 (TCH) / Trunk 4 in Port Hastings
- East end: Cabot Trail in Margaree Forks

Location
- Country: Canada
- Province: Nova Scotia
- Counties: Inverness

Highway system
- Provincial highways in Nova Scotia; 100-series
← Trunk 16	→ Trunk 22

Trunk 19 is part of the Canadian province of Nova Scotia's system of trunk highways. The road runs from Port Hastings (at the east end of the Canso Causeway) to a junction with the Cabot Trail at Margaree Forks on Cape Breton Island, a distance of 107 kilometres (66 mi). Most of the route is known as the Ceilidh Trail.

From Port Hastings (near the town of Port Hawkesbury), Trunk 19 follows the western coastline of Cape Breton Island through Judique to the village of Port Hood, where it turns inland to the northeast through Mabou. From Mabou, the route continues back towards the coast at Inverness, then returns inland. At Southwest Margaree, Trunk 19 follows the Margaree River to the end of the road.

Trunk 19 is still referred to locally as Route 19.

== Major intersections ==
The entire route is in Inverness County.

Location	km	mi	Destinations	Notes
Port Hastings	0.0	0.0	Hwy 104 (TCH) west / Trunk 4 west – Canso Causeway, Antigonish; Trunk 4 east to Hwy 104 (Fleur-de-lis Trail) – Port Hawkesbury, St. Peter's, Sydney; Hwy 105 (TCH) east – Chéticamp, Baddeck, Sydney	Roundabout; southern terminus
Mabou	59.4	36.9	Route 252 east – Brook Village, Whycocomagh	
Inverness	80.1	49.8		
Dunvegan	91.6	56.9	Route 219 east – Chimney Corner, Margaree Harbour	
Southwest Margaree	79.2	49.2	Route 395 south – Upper Margaree, Scotsville, Whycocomagh	
Margaree Forks	106.6	66.2	Cabot Trail (Trunk 30) – Margaree Harbour, Chéticamp, Pleasant Bay, North East Margaree, Baddeck	Northern terminus
1.000 mi = 1.609 km; 1.000 km = 0.621 mi
