= Ceilidh Trail =

Highway in Nova Scotia, Canada

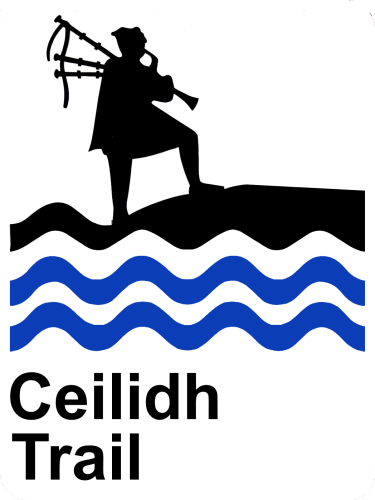
Ceilidh Trail

Route information
- Length: 112 km (70 mi)
- Component highways: Trunk 19; Route 219

Major junctions
- West end: Hwy 104 (TCH) / Hwy 105 (TCH) / Trunk 4 / Trunk 19 in Port Hastings
- East end: Route 219 / Cabot Trail in Margaree Harbour

Location
- Country: Canada
- Province: Nova Scotia
- Counties: Inverness County

Highway system
- Provincial highways in Nova Scotia; 100-series

The Ceilidh Trail is a scenic roadway in the Canadian province of Nova Scotia.

This coastal route along the Gulf of St. Lawrence is located on the west coast of Cape Breton Island in Inverness County and runs 112 kilometres (70 mi) from the Canso Causeway in Port Hastings to Margaree Harbour where it intersects with the Cabot Trail.

The region's Scottish heritage dates back to the beginning of the 19th century. Cèilidh (Scottish Gaelic pronunciation: [ˈkʲʰeːlɪ]) means a party, or an informal social gathering among neighbours and friends, often involving music, dancing and storytelling.

== Routes ==
- Trunk 19
- Route 219

== Communities ==
- Inverness, home of the Ceilidh Trail School of Celtic Music
- the Mabou Highlands
- Lake Ainslie, the largest natural fresh water lake on Cape Breton Island
- Judique
- Port Hood
