= Nova Scotia Route 219 =

Highway in Nova Scotia, Canada

Route 219
- Part of Nova Scotia's Ceilidh Trail

Route information
- Maintained by Nova Scotia Department of Transportation and Infrastructure Renewal
- Length: 20 km (12 mi)

Major junctions
- South end: Trunk 19 in Dunvegan
- North end: Cabot Trail in Margaree Harbour

Location
- Country: Canada
- Province: Nova Scotia
- Counties: Inverness

Highway system
- Provincial highways in Nova Scotia; 100-series
← Route 217	→ Route 221

Route 219 is a collector road approximately 20.3 km long in the Canadian province of Nova Scotia.

It is located in Inverness County and connects Margaree Harbour at Trunk 30 (the Cabot Trail) with Dunvegan at Trunk 19.

The road is designated as part of the Ceilidh Trail.

== Communities ==
- Dunvegan
- Rear Dunvegan
- St. Rose
- Chimney Corner
- Margaree Harbour

== See also ==
- List of Nova Scotia provincial highways
