= Balache Point Lighthouse =

Lighthouse in Nova Scotia, Canada

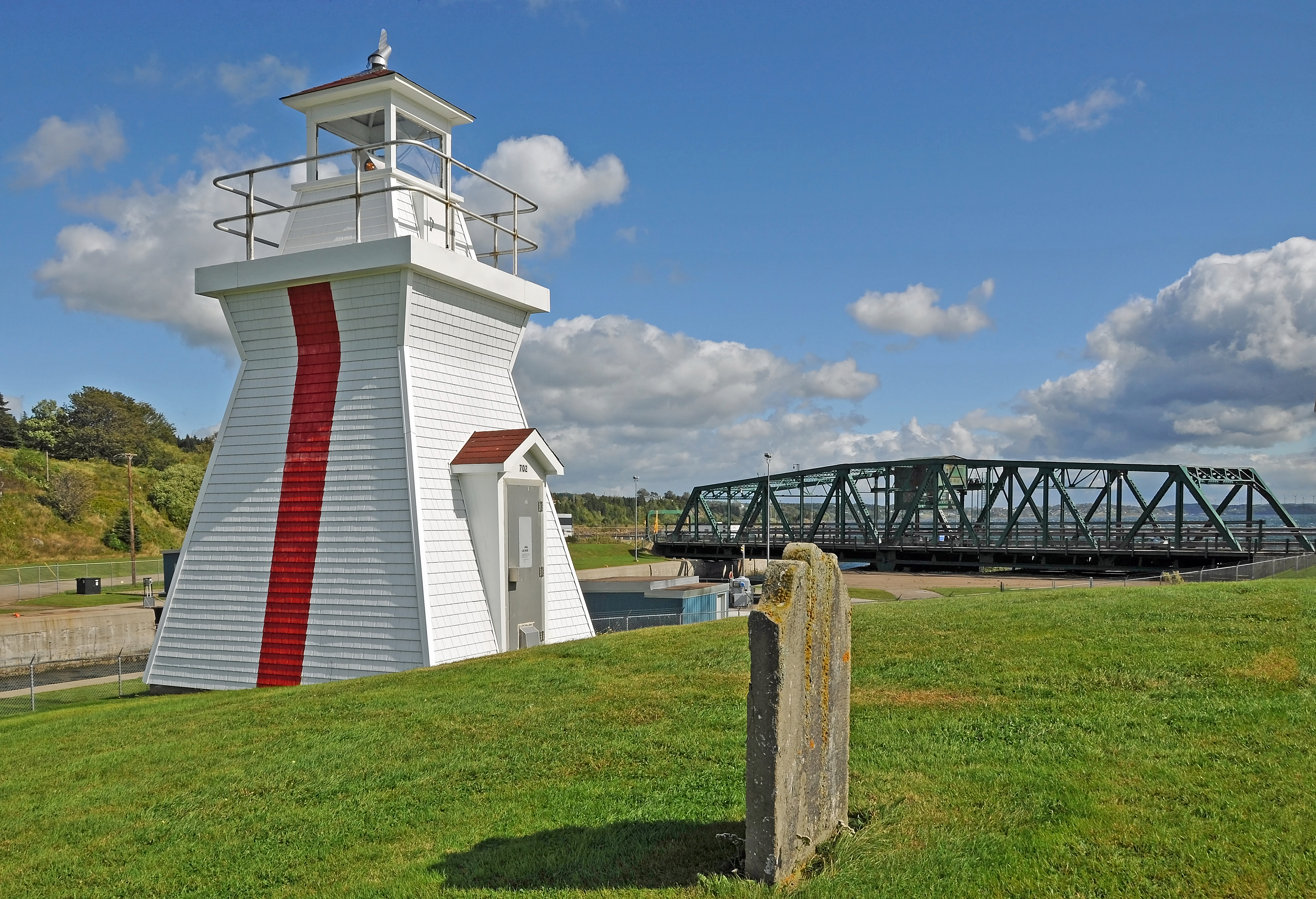
- Balache Point in 2011
- Location: Nova Scotia, Canada
- Coordinates: 45°38′53″N 61°24′52″W

Tower
- Construction: lumber
- Height: 6 metres (20 ft)
- Markings: white tower with a red vertical stripe on the range line

Light
- First lit: 1963 (current)
- Focal height: 9 metres (30 ft)
- Range: 16 nautical miles (30 km; 18 mi)
- Characteristic: Oc Y

Balache Point Lighthouse, also known as Balache Point Range Rear Lighthouse, is an active Canadian lighthouse located next to the Canso Canal, near Port Hastings, Inverness County, Nova Scotia. The salt shaker style light, which sits on a small hillock on the Cape Breton side of the canal, is the second lighthouse to be built on the site.

== History ==
The first lighthouse at Balache point was built in 1905, it displayed a fixed white light from a 9.7-metre-high (32 ft) wooden tower. A fog horn was added in 1908, and it housed a 5th order lens from 1922 to 1941. The light was decommissioned in the 1950s. Lighthouse keepers were Allan Nicholson and Catherine Nicholson.

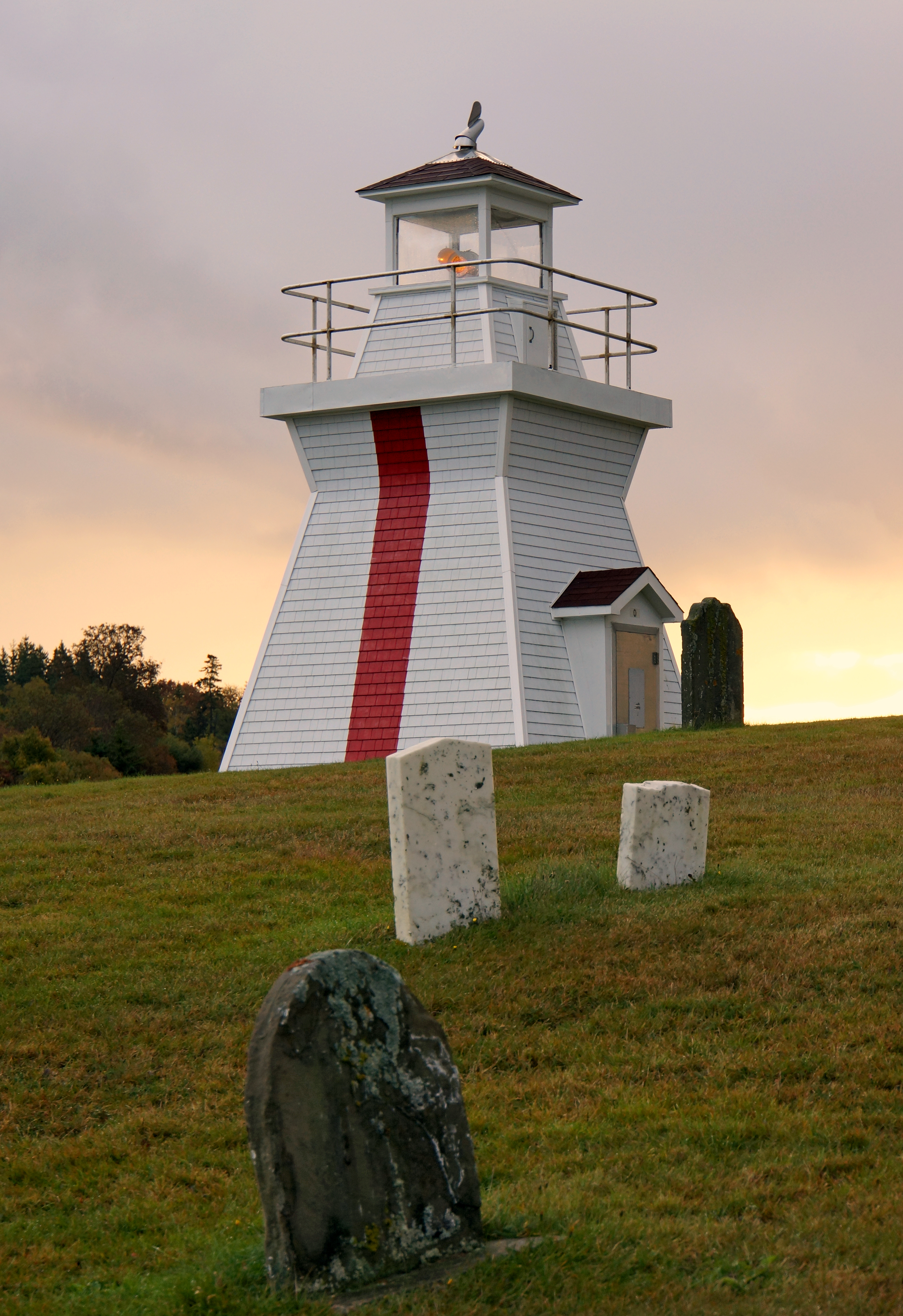
Lighthouse in 2014

The current lighthouse was built in 1963, as the rear beacon of a pair of range lights, helping to guide vessels into the canal at its northern end. The canal and its locks, allows ships to pass through the Canso Causeway, which crosses the Strait of Canso.

The front range light, built at the same time, was of a similar design, until replaced in 1991 by a more functional 6-metre-high (20 ft) skeletal tower next to the water's edge.

== Description ==
The tapering 6.7-metre-high (22 ft) wooden tower is of the salt shaker design, painted white, with a red lantern and balcony, although pictures from 2008 show an all-white tower and lantern. It has a broad vertical red stripe to mark the range line, matching the stripe on the front range tower. Both the front and rear lights display an occulting yellow light, flashing every eleven seconds, and both have a range of 16 nautical miles. The light is automatic, but only operates seasonally between April and December.

== See also ==
- List of lighthouses in Canada
