= Angus MacLennan =

Canadian politician

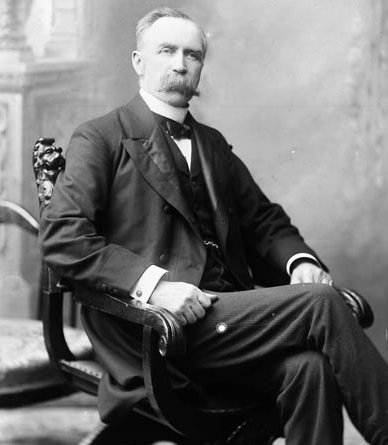

Member of the Canadian Parliament for Inverness
- In office 1896–1908
- Preceded by: Hugh Cameron
- Succeeded by: Alexander William Chisholm

Personal details
- Born: May 3, 1844 Broad Cove, Nova Scotia, Canada
- Died: August 27, 1908 (aged 64) Chéticamp, Cape Breton, Canada
- Cause of death: stroke
- Party: Liberal

Angus MacLennan (May 3, 1844 – August 27, 1908) was a Canadian politician.

Born in Dunvegan, Inverness County, on Nova Scotia's Cape Breton Island, MacLennan was the Liberal Member of Parliament for the House of Commons of Canada riding of Inverness from 1896 to 1908.

Angus MacLennan was the youngest of the ten children of John MacLennan, an early settler from Kintail Scotland. MacLennan taught at local district schools to earn money for his medical studies. He eventually graduated from the University of Pennsylvania in 1871, and practiced medicine for over 30 years in Inverness County, maintaining the practice throughout his political career. His extended family over the years now resides in Tyne Valley, Prince Edward Island and Mainland Nova Scotia.

During his time as an MP, he was instrumental in bringing the railway to the west side of Cape Breton Island, thereby spurring the growth of Inverness as a coal-exporting boom town in the first quarter of the 20th century.

MacLennan represented Inverness (as a Conservative) for one term in the Nova Scotia legislature (1882-1886).

A strong supporter of Sir Wilfrid Laurier, he was defeated in his first campaign as a Liberal in 1891, elected in the Laurier landslide of 1896, and re-elected in 1900 and 1904. He died of a stroke on August 27, 1908, in Chéticamp, Cape Breton, while campaigning for a fourth term in the 1908 federal election.

== Sources ==
- MacMillan, C.L., Memoirs of a Cape Breton Doctor, Toronto, McClelland and Stewart, 1973.
- MacDougall, J.L., "History of Inverness County" (facsimile edition), Belleville, Ontario, Mika Publishing, 1972. (originally published in Truro, N.S., 1922)
