= Isaac Duncan MacDougall =

Canadian politician

Member of Parliament for Inverness
- In office October 1925 – October 1935
- Preceded by: Alexander William Chisholm
- Succeeded by: riding abolished

Personal details
- Born: Isaac Duncan MacDougall; 10 July 1897 Strathlorne, Nova Scotia
- Died: 4 April 1969 (aged 71)
- Party: Conservative
- Spouse(s): Winnifred MacDonald m. 12 February 1929
- Profession: auditor, barrister, journalist, student

Isaac Duncan MacDougall (10 July 1897 – 4 April 1969) was a National Government, Conservative and Progressive party member of the House of Commons of Canada. He was born in Strathlorne, Nova Scotia and became an auditor, barrister, journalist and student.

MacDougall studied at St. Francis Xavier University, earning Bachelor of Arts and Master of Arts degrees.

He was first elected to Parliament at the Inverness riding in the 1925 general election after an unsuccessful campaign there as a Progressive Party candidate in the 1921 election. He was re-elected in 1926 and 1930. In the 1935 federal election, riding boundary changes meant that MacDougall's would seek re-election in the new Inverness—Richmond riding. He was defeated by Donald MacLennan of the Liberal party. MacDougall was also unsuccessful in winning back the seat in the 1940 election as a National Government candidate.
