= Nova Scotia Route 252 =

Highway in Nova Scotia, Canada

Route 252

Route information
- Maintained by Nova Scotia Department of Transportation and Infrastructure Renewal
- Length: 28 km (17 mi)

Major junctions
- West end: Trunk 19 in Mabou
- Route 395 in Churchview
- East end: Hwy 105 (TCH) in Whycocomagh

Location
- Country: Canada
- Province: Nova Scotia

Highway system
- Provincial highways in Nova Scotia; 100-series
← Route 247	→ Route 253

Route 252 is a collector road in the Canadian province of Nova Scotia.

It is located on Cape Breton Island in Inverness County and connects Mabou at Trunk 19 with Whycocomagh at Highway 105.

== Communities ==
- Mabou
- Brook Village
- Nevada Valley
- Skye Glen
- Churchview
- Whycocomagh

== Parks ==
- Mabou Provincial Park
- Whycocomagh Provincial Park

== See also ==
- List of Nova Scotia provincial highways
