= Nova Scotia Route 395 =

Highway in Nova Scotia, Canada

Route 395

Route information
- Maintained by Nova Scotia Department of Transportation and Infrastructure Renewal
- Length: 37 km (23 mi)

Major junctions
- South end: Route 252 in Churchview
- North end: Trunk 19 in Southwest Margaree

Location
- Country: Canada
- Province: Nova Scotia

Highway system
- Provincial highways in Nova Scotia; 100-series
← Route 376	→ Trunk 1

Route 395 is a collector road in the Canadian province of Nova Scotia.

It is located in Inverness County and connects Southwest Margaree at Trunk 19 with Whycocomagh at Highway 105.

== Communities ==
- Southwest Margaree
- Upper Margaree
- East Lake Ainslie
- South Lake Ainslie
- Ainslie Glen
- Churchview

== Parks ==
- Southwest Margaree Provincial Park
- Trout River Provincial Park

== See also ==
- List of Nova Scotia provincial highways
