= Samuel McDonnell =

Canadian politician

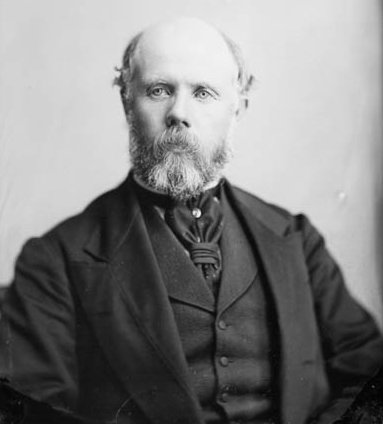

Member of the Canadian Parliament for Inverness
- In office 1872–1882
- Preceded by: Hugh Cameron
- Succeeded by: Hugh Cameron

Member of the Nova Scotia House of Assembly for Inverness
- In office 1863–1867
- In office 1871–1872

Personal details
- Born: 1834 St. Andrews, Nova Scotia
- Died: January 1, 1910 (aged 75–76) Port Hood, Nova Scotia

Samuel McDonnell (1834 – January 1, 1910) was a Canadian politician.

Born in St. Andrews, County of Antigonish, Nova Scotia, the son of Donald McDonnell (Garanaich) and Mary Macdonald, McDonnell studied law in Antigonish with William Alexander Henry. After being admitted to the bar in 1862, he practiced law in Port Hood, Nova Scotia. In 1863, he was elected to the Nova Scotia House of Assembly in Inverness. He married Annie, the daughter of Peter Smyth in 1866 and was named Queen's Counsel the following year. In 1867 MacDonnell ran in Inverness for the House of Commons of Canada, but was defeated. He was elected to the provincial assembly again in 1871. In 1872, he was elected to Parliament as a member of John A. Macdonald's Conservative caucus. After the Pacific scandal, he switched parties to the Liberals in 1874. He was re-elected in 1878 and defeated in 1882, 1887, and 1891. He was later appointed by the Laurier Government an Inspector of Customs for Eastern Nova Scotia.

McDonnell died at Port Hood at the age of 76.
