= Riverville, Nova Scotia =

Community in Nova Scotia, Canada

Coordinates: 46°8′12.01″N 61°19′45.44″W

Riverville in Nova Scotia

Riverville is a small community in the Canadian province of Nova Scotia, located in Inverness County on Cape Breton Island.

== History ==
Among the early settlers of Riverville was Alexander Beaton, who immigrated from Scotland and was provided a land grant in the area in 1824.
