= Maryville, Nova Scotia =

Community in Nova Scotia, Canada

Maryville
- Location within Nova Scotia
- Coordinates: 45°56′19.77″N 61°30′52.86″W
- Country: Canada
- Province: Nova Scotia
- County: Inverness
- District: Cape Breton Island

Maryville is a small community in the Canadian province of Nova Scotia, located in Inverness County on Cape Breton Island. Among the early settlers of Maryville were Ann McDonald and John MacIsaac, who obtained crown leases there in 1809.
