= Canso Canal =

Canal in Nova Scotia, Canada

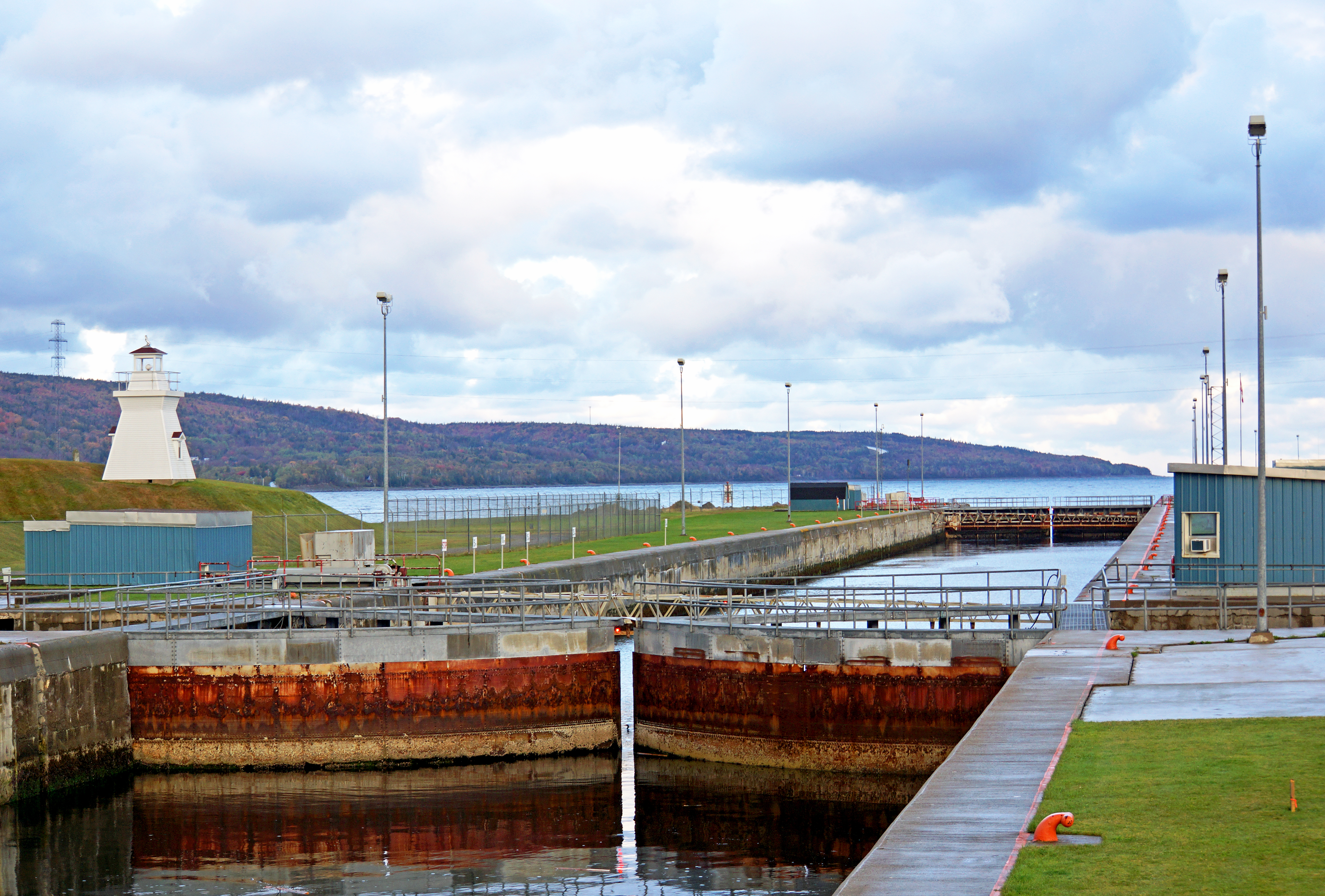
- Canso Canal lock and lighthouse

- Canso Canal in Nova Scotia
- Country: Canada
- Coordinates: 45°38′53″N 61°24′50″W

Specifications
- Length: 0.57 km (0.35 miles)
- Maximum boat length: 225.6 m (740 ft 2 in)
- Maximum boat beam: 23.8 m (78 ft 1 in)
- Maximum boat draft: 9.8 m (32 ft 2 in)
- Locks: 1 (Seawaymax Lock)
- Status: Open
- Navigation authority: Canadian Coast Guard Maritimes Region

History
- Principal engineer: O.J. McCulloch Engineers Ltd. of Montreal
- Construction began: 1953
- Date completed: September 2, 1955

Geography
- Start point: St. George's Bay in the Northumberland Strait, a sub-basin of the Gulf of St. Lawrence to the north.
- End point: Chedabucto Bay of the Atlantic Ocean to the south

The Canso Canal is a short canal located in Nova Scotia, Canada.

== Canal location ==
The Canso Canal is in the Strait of Canso, on the eastern side of the Canso Causeway, a rock-fill causeway which opened in 1955 to carry a two-lane highway and a single rail track from Cape Breton Island to mainland Nova Scotia. The canal was built through Balache Point in Inverness County.

The causeway completely blocks the Strait of Canso, which links the waters of St. George's Bay in the Northumberland Strait, a sub-basin of the Gulf of St. Lawrence, with Chedabucto Bay on the Atlantic Ocean.

== Canal dimensions ==
The canal, constructed between 1953 and 1955, is 24 metres (79 feet) wide and 570 m (1,870 ft) long, with a minimum depth of 9.8 m (32 ft 2 in). It has a single Seawaymax lock to account for tidal differences; any vessel capable of transiting the St. Lawrence Seaway will fit through the Canso Canal.

The Canso Canal Bridge is a 94-metre-long (308 ft) swing bridge which carries the Trans-Canada Highway and a railway line across the canal immediately south of the southern end of the lock.

== Canal operation ==
Vessels entering St. George's Bay to the west of the canal, or Chedabucto Bay to the east, must comply with a Vessel Traffic System operated by the Canadian Coast Guard.

An average of 2,069 ships, with an average gross tonnage of 1.88 million tons pass through the Canso Canal each year. About 85 per cent of vessel traffic is owned or operated by shipping companies, fishermen and government, the remainder being pleasure craft users.
