= Plateau, Nova Scotia =

Community in Nova Scotia, Canada

Coordinates: 46°35′52.71″N 61°0′18.38″W

Plateau in Nova Scotia

Plateau is a small community in the Canadian province of Nova Scotia, located in Inverness County on Cape Breton Island. Among the early settlers of Plateau were Pierre Bois and Peter Aucoin, who obtained land grants in the area in 1790.

In 1956, Plateau had a population of 476 people.
