= Militia Point, Nova Scotia =

Community in Nova Scotia, Canada

Coordinates: 45°50′34.48″N 60°56′49.81″W

Militia Point in Nova Scotia

Militia Point (Scottish Gaelic: Bràigh na h-Aibhneadh) is a small community in the Canadian province of Nova Scotia, located in Inverness County on Cape Breton Island. Land grants in Militia Point were provided to Hugh McKay in 1835, and Donald McFadyen in 1836.
