= Alpine Ridge, Nova Scotia =

Community in Nova Scotia, Canada

Coordinates: 46°1′2.03″N 61°25′22.24″W

Alpine Ridge in Nova Scotia

Alpine Ridge is a small community in the Canadian province of Nova Scotia, located in Inverness County. One of the early settlers of Alpine Ridge was Donald McDonald, who immigrated from Scotland and lived in the area around 1802.
