= Alba, Nova Scotia =

Community in Nova Scotia, Canada

Coordinates: 45°55′39.48″N 61°0′17.45″W

Alba in Nova Scotia

Alba is a small community in the Canadian province of Nova Scotia, located in Inverness County on Cape Breton Island. The area was settled in 1828 by Scottish immigrants, and was referred to as Boom until 1893 when it received the name Alba.
