= Inverness (federal electoral district) =

Former federal electoral district in Nova Scotia, Canada

Nova Scotia electoral district

Defunct federal electoral district
- Legislature: House of Commons
- District created: 1867
- District abolished: 1933
- First contested: 1867
- Last contested: 1930

Demographics
- Census division: Inverness

Inverness was a federal electoral district in Nova Scotia, Canada, that was represented in the House of Commons of Canada from 1867 to 1935.

It was created in the British North America Act, 1867. It was abolished in 1933 when it was merged into Inverness—Richmond riding. It consisted of Inverness County.

== Members of Parliament ==
This riding elected the following members of Parliament:

Parliament	Years	Member	Party
Inverness
1st	1867–1869	Hugh Cameron	Anti-Confederation
1st	1869–1872	Hugh Cameron	Liberal–Conservative
2nd	1872–1874	Samuel McDonnell	Conservative
3rd	1874–1878	Samuel McDonnell	Liberal
4th	1878–1882	Samuel McDonnell	Liberal
5th	1882–1887	Hugh Cameron	Conservative
6th	1887–1891	Hugh Cameron	Conservative
7th	1891–1896	Hugh Cameron	Conservative
8th	1896–1900	Angus MacLennan	Liberal
9th	1900–1904	Angus MacLennan	Liberal
10th	1904–1908	Angus MacLennan	Liberal
11th	1908–1911	Alexander William Chisholm	Liberal
12th	1911–1917	Alexander William Chisholm	Liberal
13th	1917–1921	Alexander William Chisholm	Opposition (Laurier Liberals)
14th	1921–1925	Alexander William Chisholm	Liberal
15th	1925–1926	Isaac Duncan MacDougall	Conservative
16th	1926–1930	Isaac Duncan MacDougall	Conservative
17th	1930–1935	Isaac Duncan MacDougall	Conservative
Riding dissolved into Inverness—Richmond

== Election results ==
1867 Canadian federal election
Party	Candidate	Votes
Anti-Confederation	Hugh Cameron	1,186
Conservative	Samuel McDonnell	601

1872 Canadian federal election
Party	Candidate	Votes
Conservative	Samuel McDonnell	1,293
Liberal–Conservative	Hugh Cameron	1,232

1874 Canadian federal election
Party	Candidate	Votes
Liberal	Samuel McDonnell	1,223
Liberal–Conservative	Hugh Cameron	1,102

1878 Canadian federal election
Party	Candidate	Votes
Liberal	Samuel McDonnell	1,284
Liberal–Conservative	Hugh Cameron	1,175
Unknown	Angus MacLennan	739

1882 Canadian federal election
Party	Candidate	Votes
Liberal–Conservative	Hugh Cameron	1,912
Liberal	Samuel McDonnell	1,062

1887 Canadian federal election
Party	Candidate	Votes
Conservative	Hugh Cameron	1,913
Liberal	Samuel McDonnell	1,462

1891 Canadian federal election
Party	Candidate	Votes
Conservative	Hugh Cameron	1,877
Liberal	Samuel McDonnell	1,567

1896 Canadian federal election
Party	Candidate	Votes
Liberal	Angus MacLennan	1,676
Conservative	Hugh Cameron	1,532
Independent	John McKew	737

1900 Canadian federal election
Party	Candidate	Votes
Liberal	Angus MacLennan	2,702
Conservative	Hugh Cameron	1,644

1904 Canadian federal election
Party	Candidate	Votes
Liberal	Angus MacLennan	1,963
Independent	Alexander W. Chisholm	1,653
Conservative	John H. Jamieson	1,485

1908 Canadian federal election
Party	Candidate	Votes
Liberal	Alexander W. Chisholm	3,381
Conservative	Roderick C. McLeod	1,837

1911 Canadian federal election
Party	Candidate	Votes
Liberal	Alexander W. Chisholm	2,928
Conservative	Thomas Gallant	1,920
Independent	Frank A. MacEchen	128

1917 Canadian federal election
Party	Candidate	Votes
Opposition (Laurier Liberals)	Alexander W. Chisholm	3,544
Government (Unionist)	Thomas Gallant	2,258

1921 Canadian federal election
Party	Candidate	Votes
Liberal	Alexander W. Chisholm	4,650
Progressive	Isaac Duncan MacDougall	4,128

1925 Canadian federal election
Party	Candidate	Votes
Conservative	Isaac Duncan MacDougall	5,030
Liberal	Alexander W. Chisholm	3,807

1926 Canadian federal election
Party	Candidate	Votes
Conservative	Isaac Duncan MacDougall	4,946
Liberal	Donald MacLennan	4,296

1930 Canadian federal election
Party	Candidate	Votes
Conservative	Isaac Duncan MacDougall	4,887
Liberal	Angus L. MacDonald	4,722

== See also ==
- List of Canadian electoral districts
- Historical federal electoral districts of Canada
