= Canadian Northern Railway =

Former railway company

Overview
- Headquarters: Toronto, Ontario
- Locale: Canada
- Dates of operation: 1899–1923
- Successor: Canadian National Railway

Technical
- Track gauge: 4 ft 8 1/2 in (1,435 mm) standard gauge

The Canadian Northern Railway (CNoR) was a historic Canadian transcontinental railway. At its 1923 merger into the Canadian National Railway (reporting mark CN), the CNoR owned a main line between Quebec City and Vancouver via Ottawa, Winnipeg, and Edmonton.

== Manitoba beginnings ==
The network had its start in the independent branchlines that were being constructed in Manitoba in the 1880s and 1890s as a response to the monopoly exercised by Canadian Pacific Railway (CPR). Many such lines were built with the sponsorship of the provincial government, which sought to subsidize local competition to the federally subsidized CPR; however, significant competition was also provided by the encroaching Northern Pacific Railway (NPR) from the south. In 1888 NPR established a joint venture (under Northern Pacific and Manitoba Railway Company Act) with the Government of Manitoba called Northern Pacific and Manitoba Railway Company (NP&MR) by taking over the recently created Red River Railway. NP&MR ran from US border to Winnipeg, and also westerly to Portage la Prairie, Morris, and Brandon. This venture was short lived and ended around 1899 and CNoR acquired the trackage by 1901. From the NP&MR the CNoR acquired their Winnipeg Station built in 1889 along with vacant site of the former Manitoba Hotel to become CNoR Depot until Union Station was completed.

Two branchline contractors, Sir William Mackenzie and Sir Donald Mann, took control of the bankrupt Lake Manitoba Railway and Canal Company in January 1896. The partners expanded their enterprise, in 1897, by building further north into Manitoba's Interlake district as well as east and west of Winnipeg. They also began building and buying lines south to connect with the U.S. border at Pembina, North Dakota, and east to Ontario.

== Connecting the prairies to the Lakehead ==
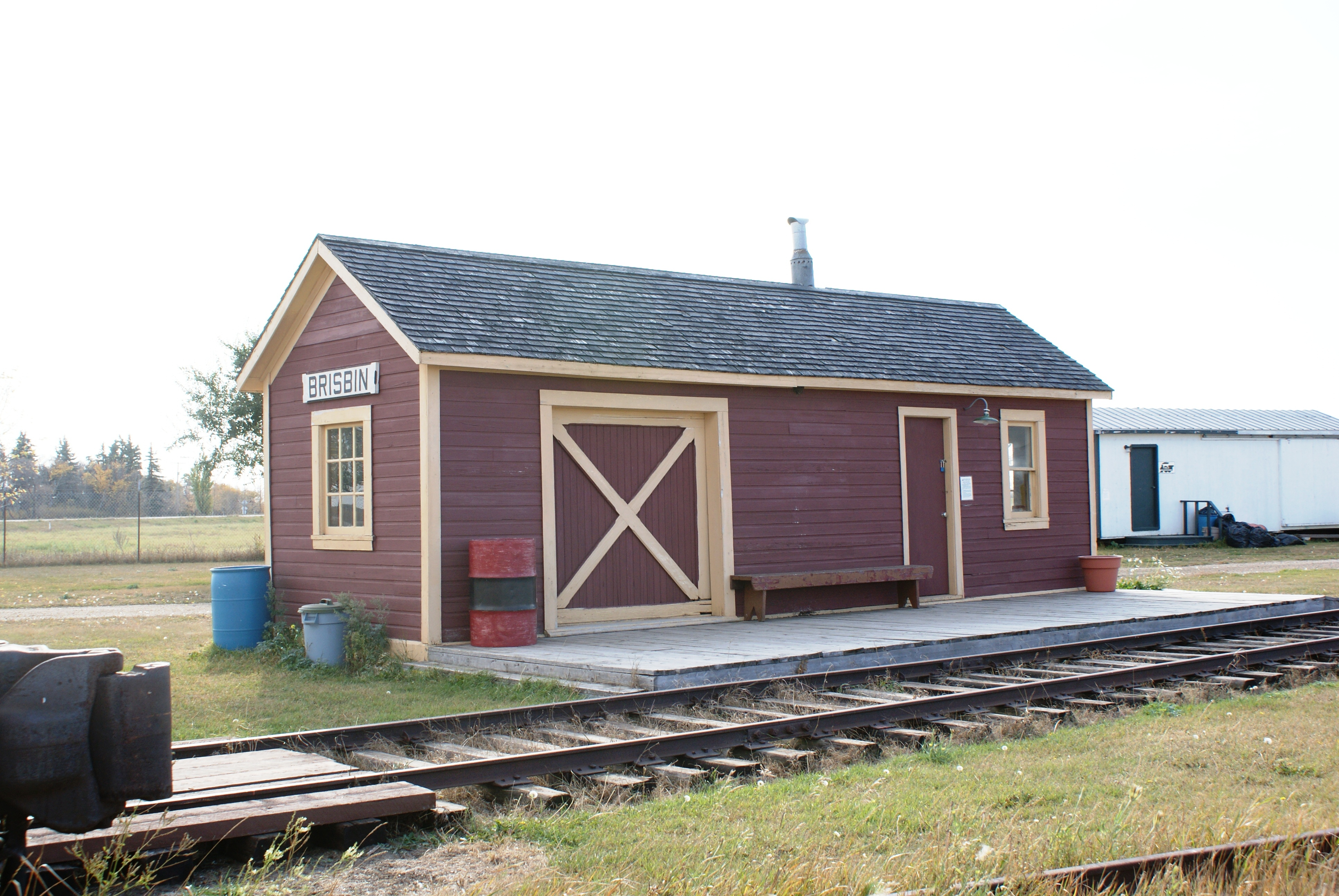
Canadian Northern Portable Train Station for Debden and later Brisbin, Saskatchewan

The Canadian Northern Railway was established, on January 13, 1899 and all railway companies owned by Mackenzie and Mann (primarily in Manitoba) were consolidated into the new entity. CNoR's first step toward competing directly with CPR came at the start of the 20th century with the decision to build a line linking the prairie provinces with Lake Superior at the harbour in Port Arthur–Fort William (modern Thunder Bay, Ontario), which would permit the shipping of western grain to European markets as well as the transport of eastern Canadian goods to the West. This line incorporated an existing CNoR line to Lake of the Woods and two local Ontario railways, the Port Arthur, Duluth and Western Railway and the Ontario and Rainy River Railway, whose charters Mackenzie and Mann had acquired in 1897.

To reach Port Arthur, which became the lake terminus of the CNoR, the line extended south of Lake of the Woods into northern Minnesota before heading northeast through Rainy River District to the head of navigation on the Great Lakes. The Winnipeg-Port Arthur line was completed on December 30, 1901, with the last spike being driven just east of Atikokan station by Ontario's Commissioner of Crown Lands, Elihu Davis.

Meanwhile, Mackenzie and Mann expanded their prairie branch line operations to feed the connection to Port Arthur. From a series of disconnected railways and charters, the network became 1,900 kilometres (1,200 mi) of profitable and continuous track that covered most of the prairies by 1902.

== Northern expansion ==
After receiving grants from the Province of Manitoba and the Dominion of Canada in the 1890s, Mackenzie and Mann began building lines further north in Manitoba, with the intention of eventually reaching Hudson Bay. Throughout the 1890s, they reached Swan River, and continued building north between the Porcupine Hills to the west and Lake Winnipegosis to the east.

In 1900, Mackenzie and Mann directed this northern line west into the Northwest Territories (later Saskatchewan), where it eventually terminated at E.R. Wood (later Erwood). This northwestern line mainly carried lumber and was extended to Melfort between 1903 and 1905.

In 1907, the Canadian Parliament pressured Mackenzie and Mann to continue building more rail towards Hudson Bay. In that year, they created a junction on the Erwood to Melfort line near the mouth of the Etoimami river, where Fort Red Deer River existed, and a line was extended north to The Pas. By 1910, the settlement at this junction was renamed Hudson Bay Junction, and the line was completed between the junction and The Pas.

The long section of rail between The Pas and Churchill was never completed by CNoR. However, after CNoR was acquired by CN, the line was completed in 1929. (see Hudson Bay Railway)

== Transcontinental ==
Once elected in 1896, Prime Minister Wilfrid Laurier was eager for a second transcontinental. However, an expansion of the non-CPR railways west of Alberta would be a mammoth questionable gamble for the operators. Adding an equally costly route to supplement the existing uneconomical CP track through Ontario seemed more ludicrous. At the time, the CNoR planned to advance no further west than Edmonton. In 1902, the GTR held talks with Laurier and agreed to build a transcontinental under the auspices of the GTPR for the western portion, with the eastern portion built by the government-owned NTR. The CNoR, which had a charter to build westward to the mouth of the Skeena River was alarmed, but in no hurry, because it believed the GTPR would choose one of the more northerly passes to cross the Canadian Rockies, leaving the Yellowhead Pass for the CNoR. Despite promptings, the GTP was unwilling to collaborate with the CNoR in any joint construction.

== Western Canada expansion ==
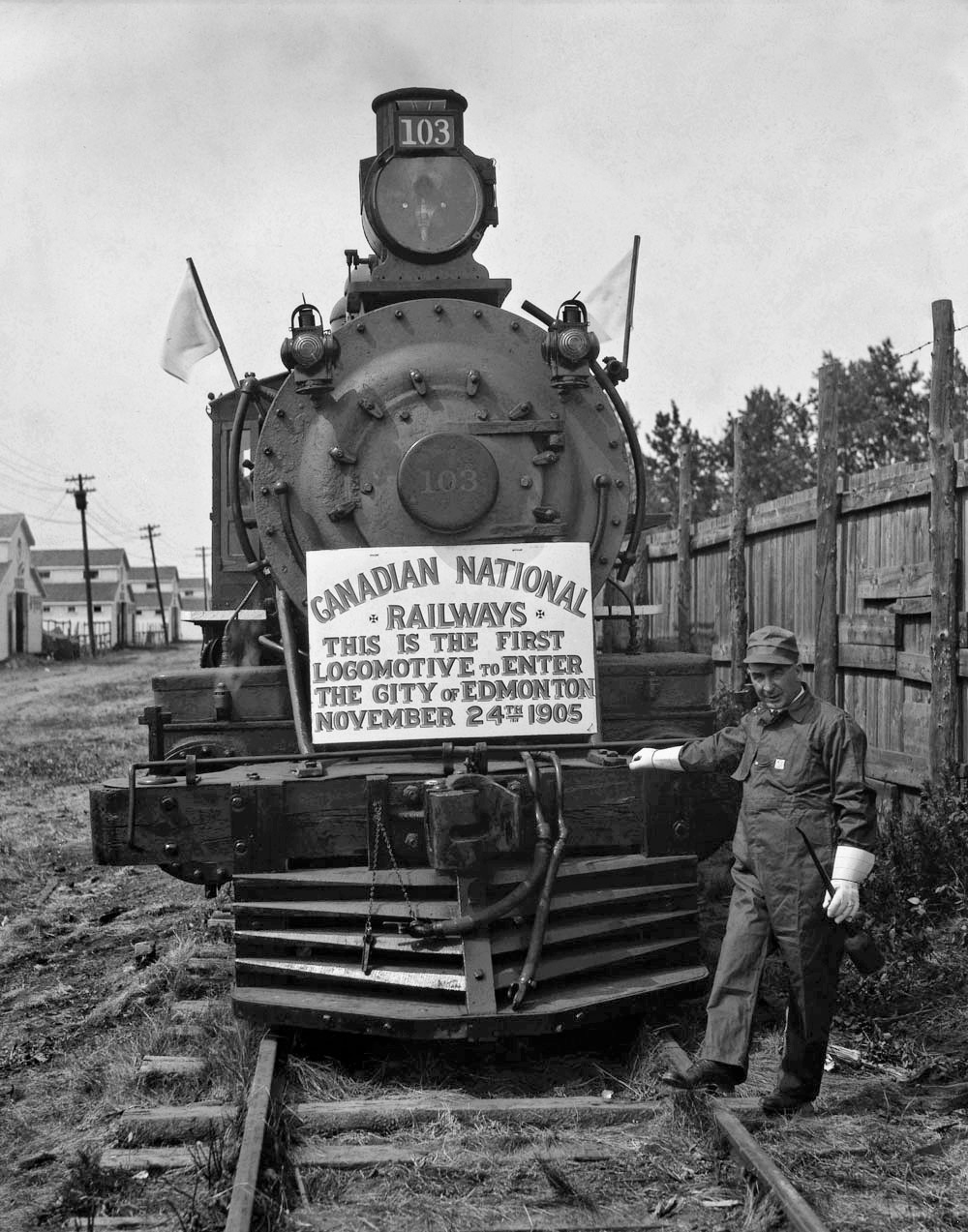
Canadian Northern Railway (CNoR) arrived in Edmonton in 1905.

In 1905, CNoR reached Edmonton, just as part of the old NWT had changed into the province of Alberta. The rail-line crossed the North Saskatchewan River at Fort Saskatchewan, coming into Edmonton from the northeast, following the present-day LRT track.

After a pause, the CNoR began construction west from Edmonton, and by summer 1907 had gone as far as Stony Plain. A stock market crash that year ceased construction. When construction was resumed in 1910, it was found that extending the Stony Plain line meant frequent crossings over the Grand Trunk Pacific line which had been laid in the meantime. Instead CNoR decided to leave Edmonton through St. Albert. (A bump on 124th Street near Stony Plain Road is remnant of the constructed but abandoned road-bed.)

CNoR's terminus on the coast changed over time. Rather than competing with the GTPR in having a terminal at the mouth of the Skeena, the CNoR accepted BC government subsidies to switch to the Vancouver area. When the GTPR selected the Yellowhead route, CNoR protests created some delay but could not overturn the decision.

In 1911, CNoR workers started on a townsite named Port Mann on the Fraser River. This townsite would accommodate new car shops, and from there, rail-lines would extend to Vancouver and the Fraser River delta.

CNoR's initial expansion in the 1890s and 1900s had been relatively frugal, largely by acquiring bankrupt companies or finishing failed construction projects. By the 1910s, significant expenses were accumulating. The CNoR started construction west of Edmonton in 1910, fully two years later than GTPR. The construction through the Rockies, which was expensive, largely paralleled the GTPR line of 1911, creating about 160 kilometres (100 mi) of duplication. However, the largest costs were from building on "the wrong side" of the Thompson and Fraser rivers in the Coast Mountains of British Columbia. CPR already had trackage on the desirable banks, forcing the CNoR to blast tunnels and ledges out of these canyons.

The most infamous construction folly on the CNoR in British Columbia happened in 1913, when blasting for a passage for the railway at Hells Gate triggered an enormous landslide which partially blocked the narrow swift-flowing Fraser River. The resulting damage to Pacific salmon runs took decades to reverse by the governmental construction of fishways.

== Eastern Canada expansion ==
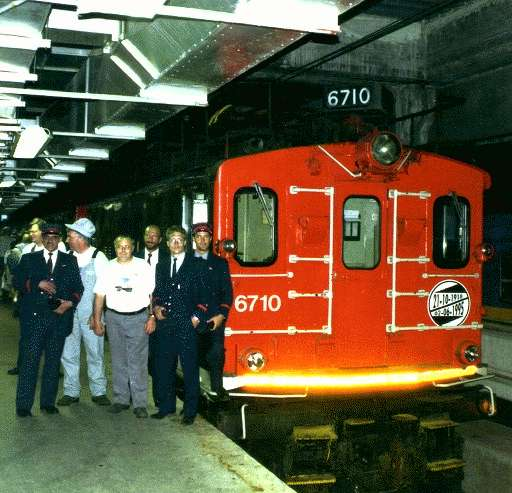
The last of the locomotives built for the Canadian Northern was retired in 1995. The same unit had inaugurated the Mount Royal Tunnel in 1918.

Mackenzie and Mann began their first significant expansion outside of the prairies with the purchase of Great Lakes steamships, the Quebec and Lake St-John Railway (1906) into northern Quebec's Saguenay region and the acquisition of branchlines in southwestern Nova Scotia (the Halifax and Southwestern Railway) and western Cape Breton Island (the Inverness and Richmond Railway). Other acquisitions were in southern Ontario and a connecting line was built from Toronto to Parry Sound.

In 1908, a line, which under later CN ownership was known as the Alderdale Subdivision, was built east from a connection at Capreol, Ontario, on the Toronto – Parry Sound line to Ottawa and on to Montreal. In 1910 a direct Toronto–Montreal line was built. In 1911, federal funding enabled construction of the line Montreal – Ottawa – Capreol – Port Arthur. In 1912, with GTR and CPR holding the ideal southern routes around Mount Royal to downtown Montreal, CNoR started building a double-tracked mainline north by excavating the Mount Royal Tunnel.

== Steamships ==
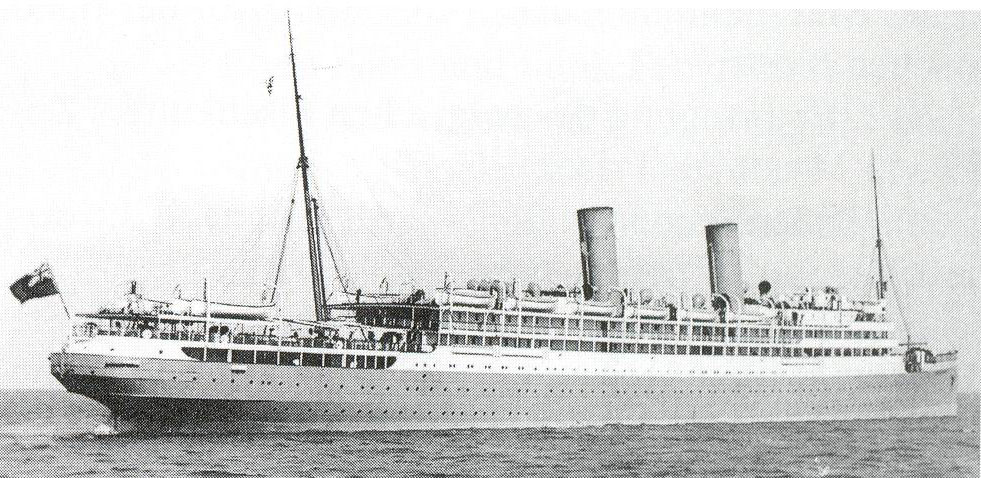
Royal Edward

House flag of Royal Line

In 1910 the company entered the trans-Atlantic liner business with the founding of the Canadian Northern Steamship Company. The subsidiary acquired two liners from the Egyptian Mail Steamship Company and operated them under its Royal Line brand. The pair of ships were renamed upon purchase—Cairo became Royal Edward and Heliopolis became Royal George—and refitted for travel on the North Atlantic. In Royal Line service, Royal Edward sailed from Avonmouth to Montreal in the summer months and to Halifax in the winter months. At the outbreak of World War I, Royal Edward and Royal George were both requisitioned for use as troopships.

On August 13, 1915, the German submarine UB-14 sank Royal Edward, which was transporting troops from Avonmouth to Gallipoli.

Royal George was sold to Cunard in 1916, became an emigrant ship in Cherbourg by 1920 and scrapped in 1922 in Wilhelmshaven.

Plans for a trans-Pacific service were mothballed.

== Resort development ==
In 1914, to develop a resort on Grand Beach, CNoR bought a 150-acre (61 ha) homestead north of Winnipeg on the shores of Lake Winnipeg. The government bought the resort, which included the 64-room Grand Beach Hotel, from CNR for $225,000, taking possession in 1961. The hotel was torn down in 1963, and a motel was built.

== Financial trouble and nationalization ==
By 1914, with the company's financial predicament threatening the solvency of its major financier, the Bank of Commerce, the CNoR appealed for government help. The last spike of the CNoR transcontinental railway was driven January 23, 1915, at Basque, British Columbia, with Montreal-Vancouver freight and passenger services commencing six months later, and providing a rail network in Nova Scotia, Southern Ontario, Minnesota, and on Vancouver Island. Between 1915 and 1918, CNoR tried desperately to increase profits, but CPR garnered the majority of wartime traffic. The company was also saddled with ongoing construction costs associated with the Mount Royal Tunnel project.

CNoR was heavily indebted to banks and governments, and its profitable branchlines in the prairie provinces — "Canada's breadbasket" — would not generate enough revenue to cover construction costs in other areas. Unable to meet its debts, the company became desperate for financial aid. In 1917, the federal government effectively took control of the company. As a condition for further funding, the government became the majority shareholder. On September 6, 1918, the directors, Mackenzie and Mann, resigned, replaced by a government-appointed board. Subsequently, CNoR executive David Blyth Hanna and his team managed not only CNoR operations but also the federally owned Canadian Government Railways (CGR). On December 20, 1918, a Privy Council order directed CNoR and CGR to be managed under the name Canadian National Railway (CNR) as a means to simplify funding and operations, but CNoR and CGR would not formally merge and cease corporate existence until January 20, 1923, the date Parliament passed the final act to incorporate them into CNR.

Significant portions of the old CNoR system survive under CN (as the CNR has been known since 1960); for example:

- the Mount Royal Tunnel and suburban line to Deux-Montagnes, Quebec
- the line from Montreal (Pointe-aux-Trembles) northeast to Saguenay, Quebec
- the CN main line north and west from Toronto to Longlac, Ontario, about 900 km east of Winnipeg
- the CN main line from the Yellowhead Pass southwest to Vancouver.

The majority of CN's former CNoR branchline network across Canada has either been abandoned or sold to shortline operators. An important U.S. subsidiary of CNoR, the Duluth, Winnipeg and Pacific Railway, forms part of a key CN connection between Chicago and Winnipeg.

== See also ==
- Bay of Quinte Railway (acquired 1910)
- Canadian Northern Pacific Railway (subsidiary, incorporated 1910)
- Central Ontario Railway (acquired 1911 as part of Irondale, Bancroft & Ottawa Railway)
- Halifax and Southwestern Railway (acquired post-1906)
- Inverness and Richmond Railway (acquired late 1890s)
- Railway Museum of Eastern Ontario (former CNoR Smiths Falls station)
- Qu'Appelle, Long Lake and Saskatchewan Railroad and Steamboat Company (acquired July 1906)
- History of rail transport in Canada
- List of defunct Canadian railways
