= Nevada Valley, Nova Scotia =

Community in Nova Scotia, Canada

Coordinates: 46°2′55″N 61°15′59″W

Nevada Valley in Nova Scotia

Nevada Valley is a small community in the Canadian province of Nova Scotia, located in Inverness County on Cape Breton Island. The area used to be referred to as Brook Village Rear.
