= Pepperpot (lighthouse) =

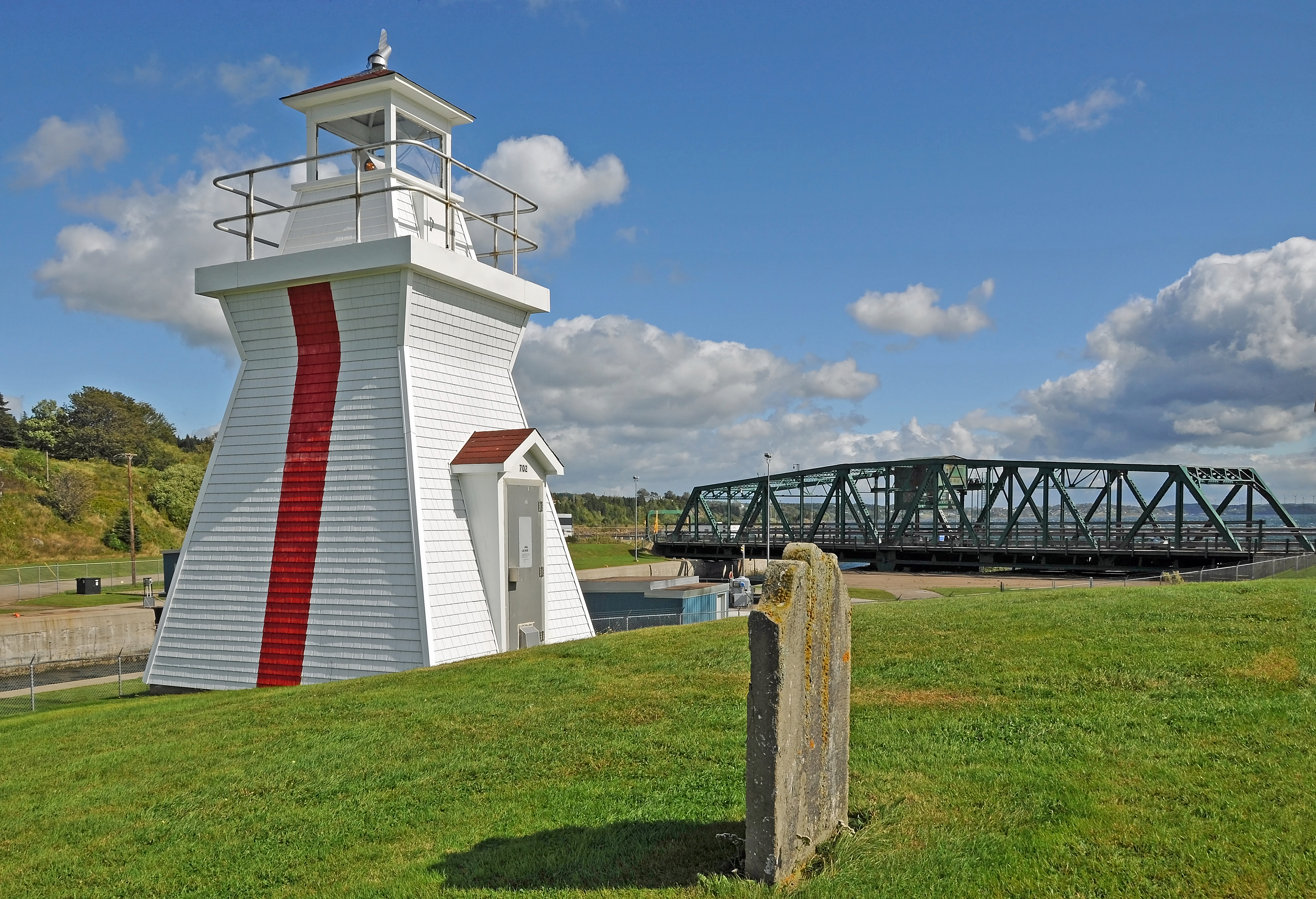
Balache Point Lighthouse, an example of a Salt Shaker lighthouse.

A Pepperpot or Salt Shaker lighthouse is a type of small lighthouse that has an architectural style similar to a scaled up salt or pepper shaker. These lighthouses feature a square tapered base with a single gallery and a square lantern. They are usually shingled in wood and painted white; the lantern and trim are red. Many such lighthouses still exist across Canada, especially in the Maritime provinces.

Three Pepperpot lighthouses exist in the Caledonian Canal in Scotland. These are of a slightly different design, consisting of a short round tower with a conical roof. St. Catherine's Oratory a medieval lighthouse on St. Catherine's Down on the southern coast of the Isle of Wight, is also known locally as "the pepperpot".

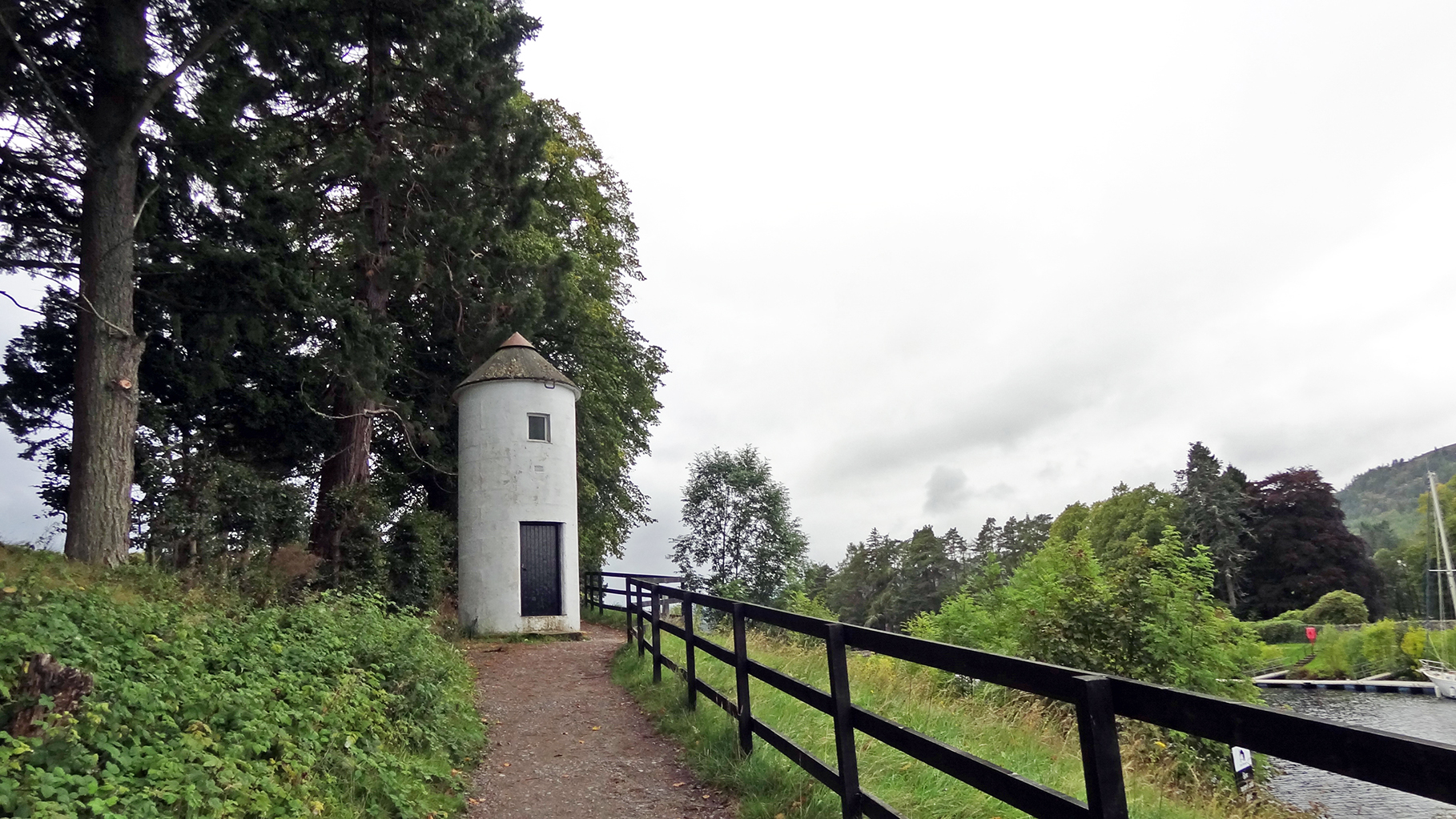
Pepperpot lighthouse on the Caledonian Canal

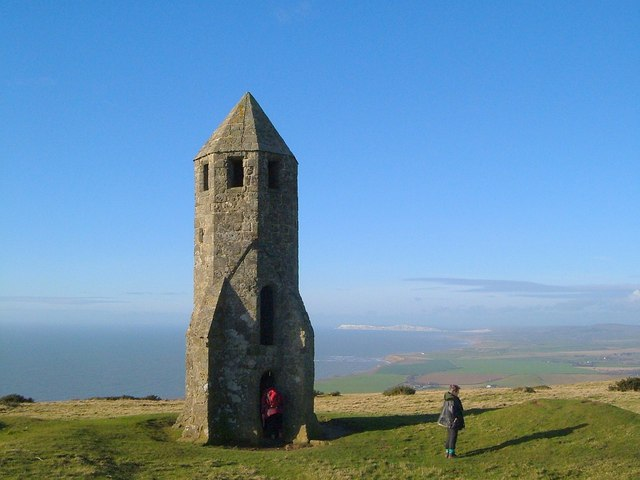
St. Catherine's Oratory is also known as the pepperpot
