= St. Rose, Nova Scotia =

Community in Nova Scotia, Canada

Coordinates: 46°21′1.74″N 61°10′54.59″W

St. Rose in Nova Scotia

St. Rose (Scottish Gaelic: Na Pònaichean) is a small community in the Canadian province of Nova Scotia, located in Inverness County on Cape Breton Island. The area was known as Broad Cove Ponds until the name was changed to St. Rose in 1891.
