= Glendyer, Nova Scotia =

Community in Nova Scotia, Canada

Coordinates: 46°5′26.21″N 61°20′49.09″W

Glendyer in Nova Scotia

Glendyer is a small community in the Canadian province of Nova Scotia, located in Inverness County on Cape Breton Island. The name comes from a dye mill established in 1848 by Donald McLean MacDonald, who came to the area from New Glasgow.
