= Chimney Corner, Nova Scotia =

Locality in Nova Scotia, Canada

Coordinates: 46°24′29.79″N 61°8′55.94″W

Chimney Corner in Nova Scotia

Chimney Corner (Scottish Gaelic: Cùil an t-Simileir) is a locality in the Canadian province of Nova Scotia, located in Inverness County on Cape Breton Island. Chimney Corner was named for a tall pinnacle of rock in the area said to resemble a chimney.
