= Strait of Canso =

Strait in Nova Scotia, Canada

Coordinates: 45°35′50″N 61°22′38″W

Strait of Canso, Nova Scotia

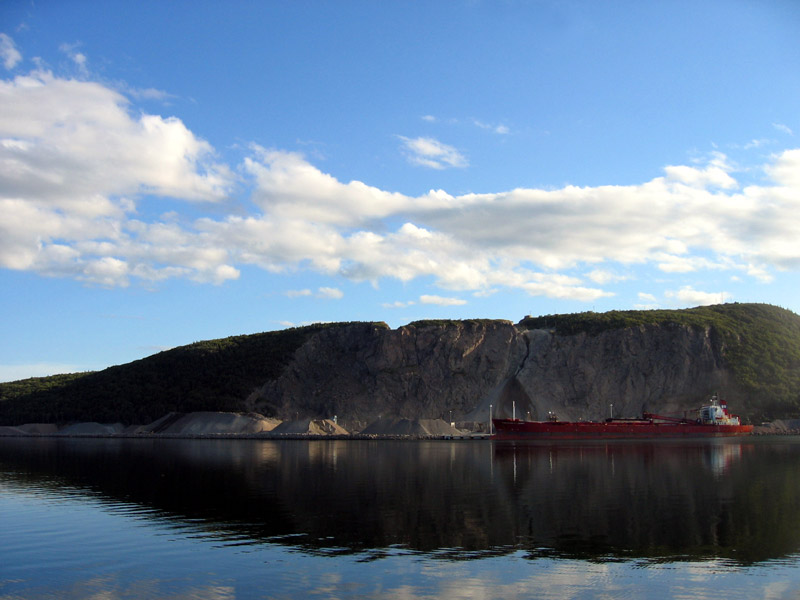
Oceangoing vessel loading rock at Cape Porcupine in the Strait of Canso

The Strait of Canso (also Gut of Canso or Canso Strait, also called Straits of Canceau or Canseaux until the early 20th century) separates mainland Nova Scotia and Cape Breton Island, in eastern Canada. Its name in Mi'kmaw language, the local First Nations language, is Tui'gn which means "passage".

It is a channel approximately 27 kilometers long and averaging 3 kilometers wide (1 km at its narrowest). The strait connects Chedabucto Bay on the Atlantic Ocean to St. George's Bay on the Northumberland Strait, a subbasin of the Gulf of St. Lawrence.

The strait is (200+ feet) deep, with two significant communities at Port Hawkesbury on the eastern side facing Mulgrave on the western side, both ports. The strait is crossed by the Canso Causeway for vehicular and rail traffic, opened in 1955. The Canso Canal allows ships to pass through the causeway, and this can accommodate any vessel capable of transiting the St. Lawrence Seaway.

An account of early settlement in the area is given in the letters of resident Henry Nicholas Paint (1830–1921), Member of Parliament for Richmond county and merchant, whose father Nicholas secured valuable land grants and settled in a stone-built house at Belle Vue in 1817. Port Hawkesbury, at first known as Ship Harbour, emerged as a shipbuilding and boatbuilding port on the Strait in the 19th century with firms such as H.W. Embree and Sons producing distinctive fishing boats that came to be known as "Canso Boats" after the Strait.
