= Churchview, Nova Scotia =

Community in Nova Scotia, Canada

Coordinates: 45°59′5″N 61°8′32″W

Churchview in Nova Scotia

Churchview is a small community in the Canadian province of Nova Scotia, located in Inverness County on Cape Breton Island.

== History ==
The early settlers of Churchview included Kenneth McDougall, who was provided a land grant in the area in 1861, and Hector McLean, who was provided a land grant in 1866.

Churchview had a population of 56 people in 1956.
