= Port Hood, Nova Scotia =

Community in Nova Scotia, Canada

Coordinates: 46°01′00″N 61°32′00″W

Port Hood in Nova Scotia

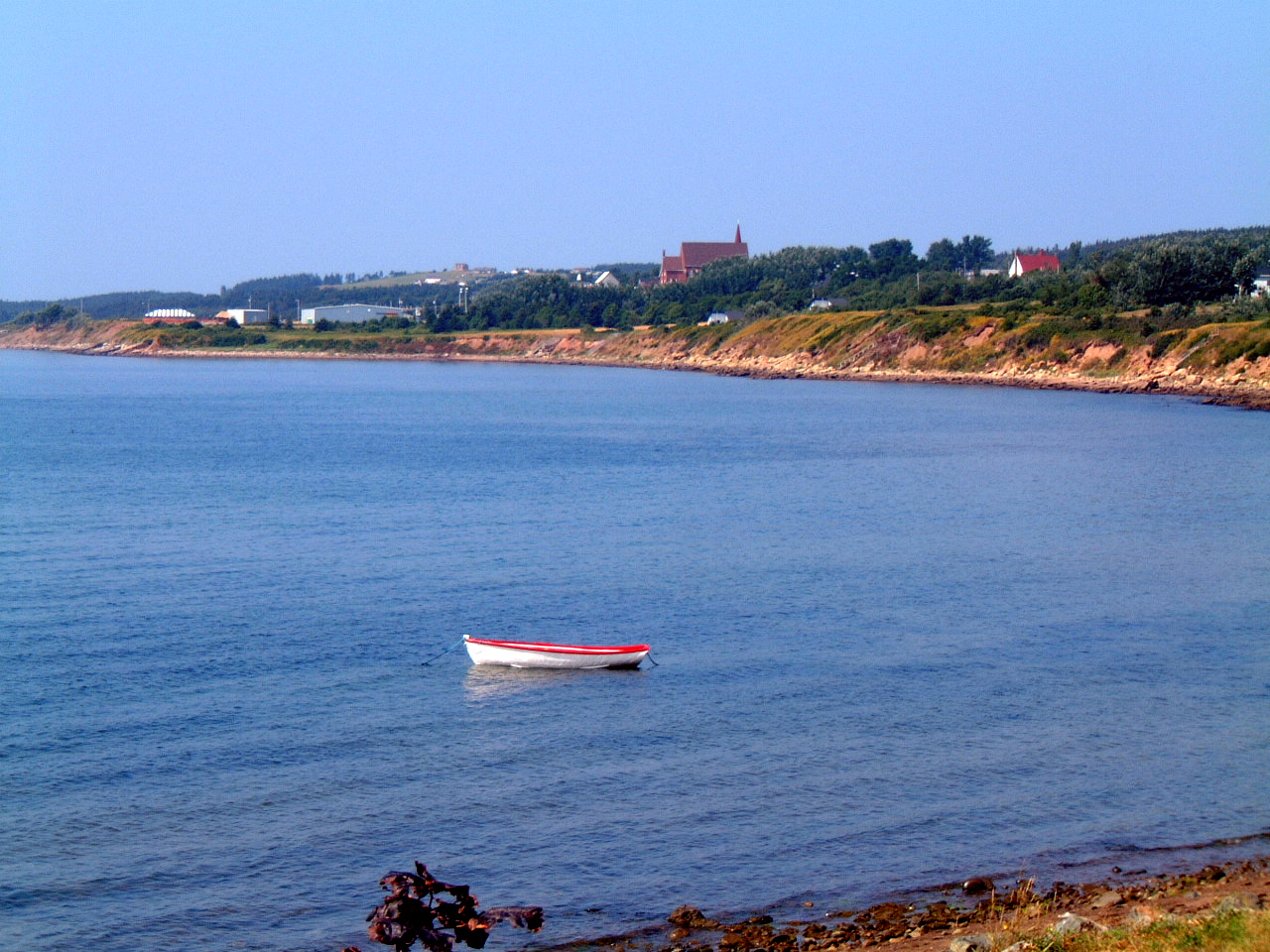
Port Hood Harbour

Port Hood (Mi'kmawi'simk: Kekwiamkek) is an unincorporated community in the Municipality of the County of Inverness, Nova Scotia, Canada. It is an administrative centre and a service centre for the surrounding area. It is also the site of a registered historic place, Peter Smyth House. Port Hood is the Capital of the County of Inverness, and is home to its Court House.

Port Hood Beach is known for its warm waters and for the nearby Port Hood Station Provincial Park.

== History ==
The Miꞌkmaq called it Kekwiamkek, meaning "at the place where sand moves slowly," or sandbar. The first European colonists, the French, called it Juste-au-Corps, meaning waistcoat. The French quarried stone for the Fortress of Louisbourg and built ships at the site. After the English took over Acadia, it was renamed for naval commander Samuel Hood.

Port Hood experienced an economic boom from 1880 to 1910, with coal mining, fishing and marine trade. During the first half of the 1900s, it was served by the Inverness and Richmond Railway. A fire in July 1942 destroyed much of the town's business district.

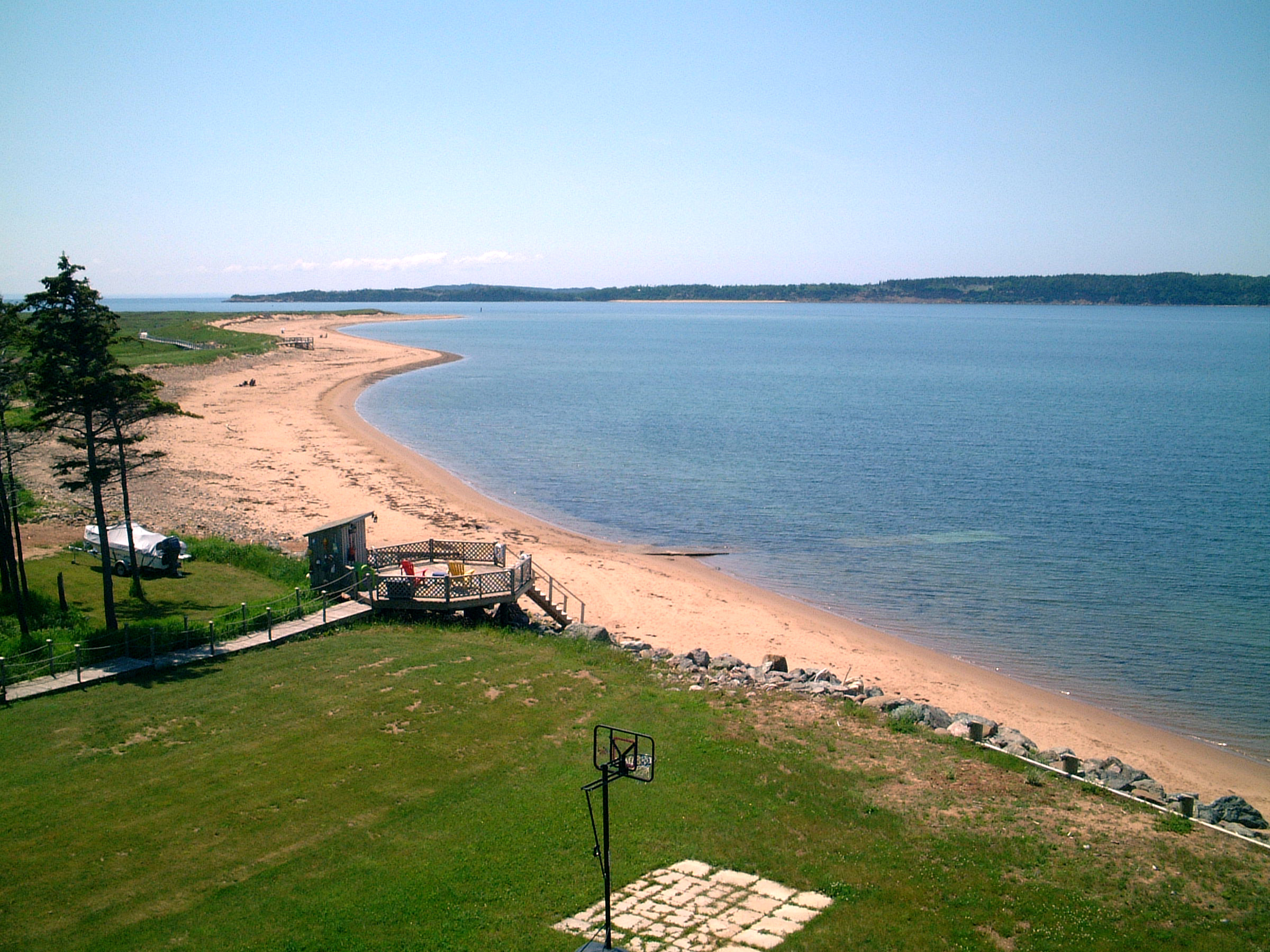
High Tide in Port Hood

The community was home to the Port Hood Consolidated School, which closed in 2000 and was replaced by Bayview Education Centre.

== Geography ==
It is located on Trunk 19 (the "Ceilidh Trail"), approximately 30-minutes drive north from the Canso Causeway which links Cape Breton Island to the Nova Scotia peninsula.

== Climate ==
Climate data for Port Hood, 2018–2024 normals, extremes 2018–present
Month	Jan	Feb	Mar	Apr	May	Jun	Jul	Aug	Sep	Oct	Nov	Dec	Year
Record high °C (°F)	13.4 (56.1)	13.2 (55.8)	18.4 (65.1)	20.8 (69.4)	27.3 (81.1)	30.6 (87.1)	31.7 (89.1)	31.7 (89.1)	28.9 (84.0)	23.6 (74.5)	20.6 (69.1)	15.0 (59.0)	31.7 (89.1)
Mean maximum °C (°F)	9.9 (49.8)	10.3 (50.5)	13.1 (55.6)	17.1 (62.8)	24.3 (75.7)	27.6 (81.7)	29.9 (85.8)	29.6 (85.3)	26.4 (79.5)	21.4 (70.5)	18.7 (65.7)	14.4 (57.9)	31.0 (87.8)
Mean daily maximum °C (°F)	1.1 (34.0)	−0.3 (31.5)	3.3 (37.9)	7.9 (46.2)	12.8 (55.0)	20.1 (68.2)	24.0 (75.2)	24.4 (75.9)	20.0 (68.0)	14.3 (57.7)	8.3 (46.9)	3.7 (38.7)	11.6 (52.9)
Daily mean °C (°F)	−2.6 (27.3)	−4.1 (24.6)	−0.8 (30.6)	3.5 (38.3)	7.8 (46.0)	15.1 (59.2)	19.4 (66.9)	19.7 (67.5)	15.5 (59.9)	10.4 (50.7)	4.9 (40.8)	0.7 (33.3)	7.5 (45.5)
Mean daily minimum °C (°F)	−6.0 (21.2)	−7.9 (17.8)	−4.5 (23.9)	−0.3 (31.5)	3.0 (37.4)	10.6 (51.1)	15.1 (59.2)	15.1 (59.2)	10.6 (51.1)	6.3 (43.3)	1.5 (34.7)	−2.2 (28.0)	3.4 (38.1)
Mean minimum °C (°F)	−15.2 (4.6)	−16.8 (1.8)	−14.8 (5.4)	−5.1 (22.8)	−2.8 (27.0)	1.8 (35.2)	8.5 (47.3)	7.5 (45.5)	1.3 (34.3)	−0.8 (30.6)	−4.8 (23.4)	−8.4 (16.9)	−17.9 (−0.2)
Record low °C (°F)	−17.5 (0.5)	−24.3 (−11.7)	−17.3 (0.9)	−7.1 (19.2)	−4.9 (23.2)	0.0 (32.0)	6.2 (43.2)	5.6 (42.1)	−0.4 (31.3)	−1.2 (29.8)	−9.6 (14.7)	−12.2 (10.0)	−24.3 (−11.7)
Average rainfall mm (inches)	79.2 (3.12)	60.2 (2.37)	75.9 (2.99)	70.9 (2.79)	69.0 (2.72)	93.2 (3.67)	88.4 (3.48)	99.3 (3.91)	78.1 (3.07)	122.1 (4.81)	117.2 (4.61)	100.8 (3.97)	1,054.4 (41.51)
Source: Cape Breton Mesonet

== Notable residents ==
- Al MacInnis: professional ice hockey player who has made generous donations to the local arena, now renamed the Al MacInnis Sports Centre.
