= Municipality of the County of Inverness =

- County municipality
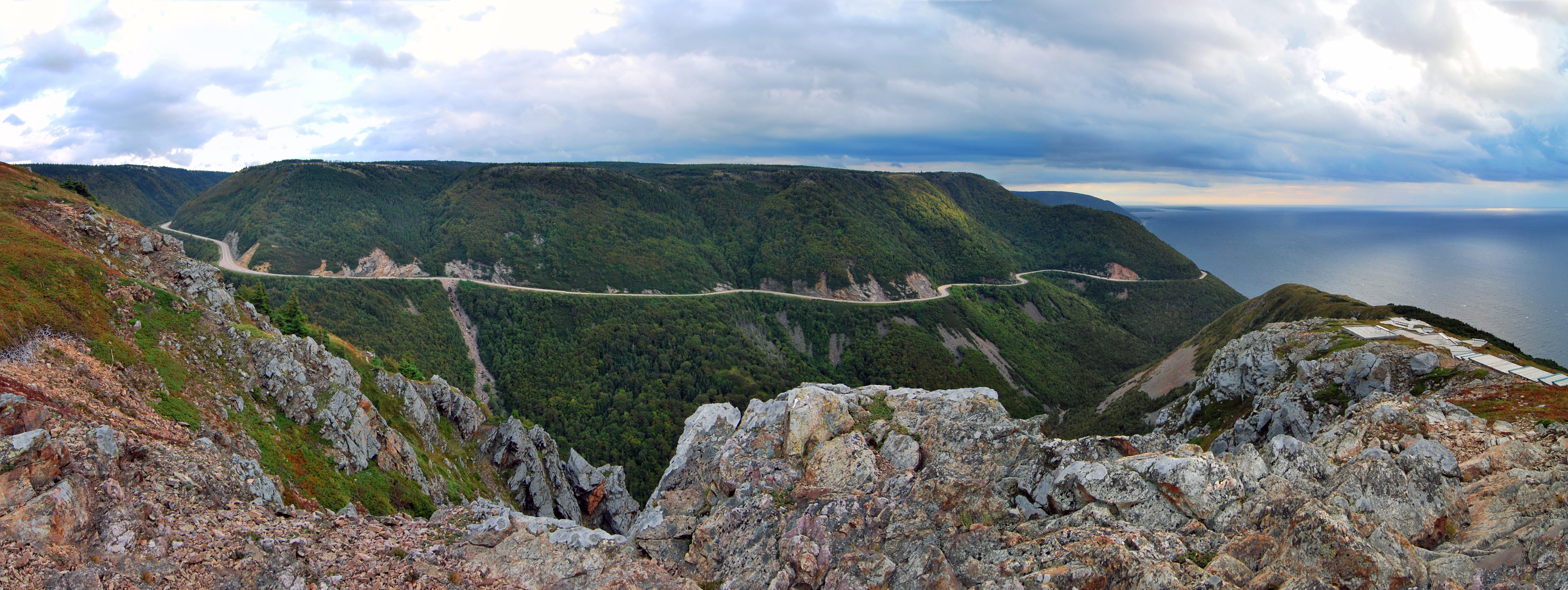
- Cabot Trail seen from the Skyline Trail

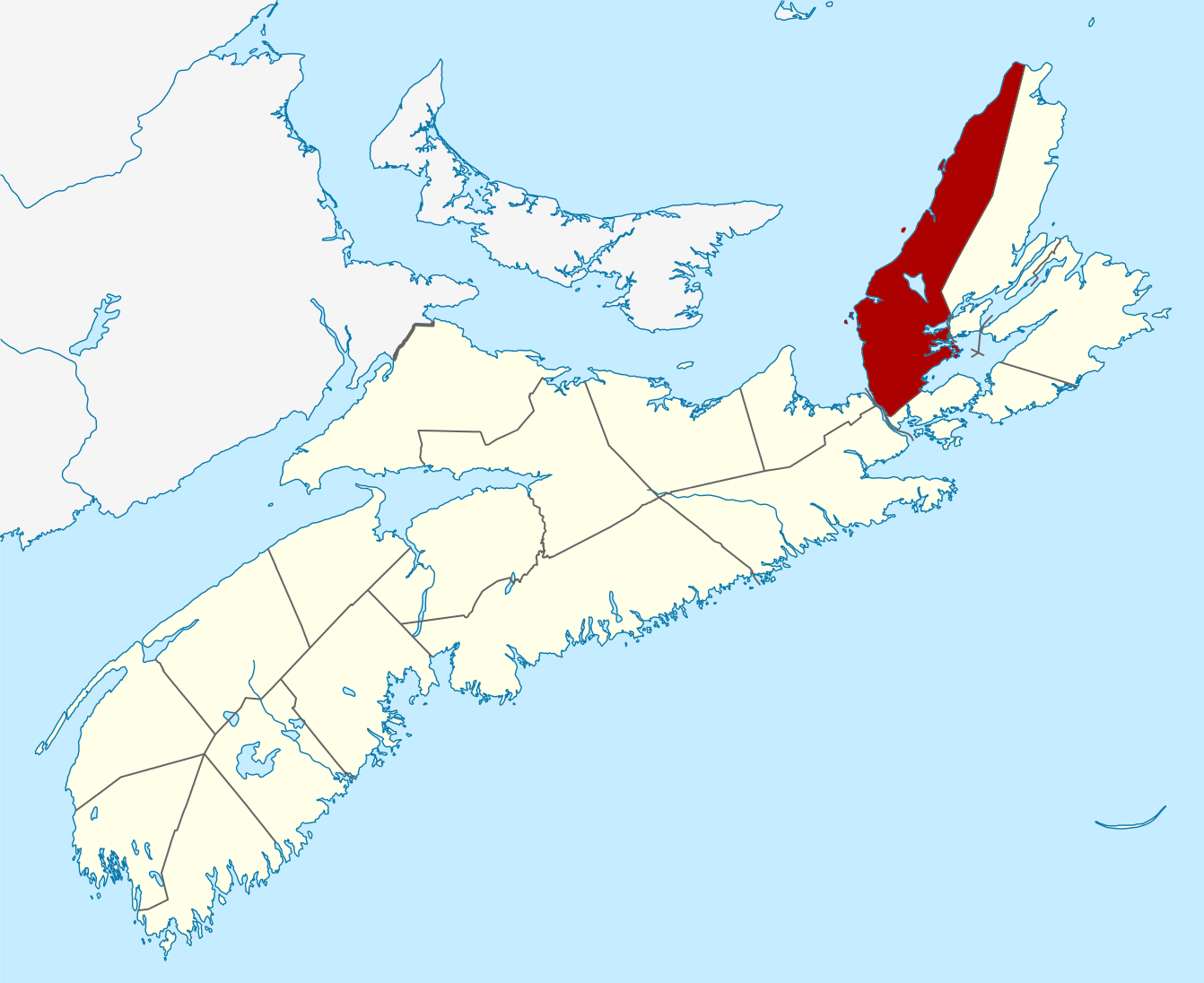
- Location of Inverness County, Nova Scotia
- Coordinates: 46.2°N 61.1°W
- Country: Canada
- Province: Nova Scotia
- Towns: Port Hood
- Established as Juste au Corps: 1835
- Renamed Inverness: 1837
- Incorporated: 1879
- Electoral Districts Federal: Cape Breton—Canso / Sydney—Victoria
- Provincial: Inverness

Government
  - Type: Inverness County Municipal Council

Area
  - Land: 3,831.17 km^{2} (1,479.22 sq mi)

Population (2016)
  - Total: 17,235
  - Density: 4.5/km^{2} (12/sq mi)
  - Change 2001-06: ▼4.5%
- Time zone: UTC-4 (AST)
  - Summer (DST): UTC-3 (ADT)
- Area code: 902
- Dwellings: 9,876
- Median Income*: $45,687 CDN
- Website: invernesscounty.ca

The Municipality of the County of Inverness (Scottish Gaelic: Siorramachd Inbhir Nis) is a county municipality on Cape Breton Island, Nova Scotia, Canada. It provides local government to about 17,000 residents of the historical county of the same name, except for the incorporated town of Port Hawkesbury and the Whycocomagh 2 Miꞌkmaq reserve, both of which are enclaves. Public services are provided in the areas of recreation, tourism, administration, finance, and public works.

== History ==
The county was named after Inverness in the Scottish Highlands from where many immigrants came. The boundaries were defined when Cape Breton Island was divided into districts in 1823. In 1996, the county was amalgamated into a single municipality with the exception of Port Hawkesbury.

Coal deposits exist between Port Hastings and Cheticamp. The Inverness and Richmond Railway, from Port Hastings to Inverness, was built around 1900 to transport coal. Coal mining was unprofitable, and small scale local operations ended in 1992. The railway was abandoned in the 1980s and is now a snowmobile and all-terrain vehicle trail marketed as The Celtic Shores Coastal Trail.

The settlement of Marble Mountain is named for limestone deposits there that were quarried until 1921. MacLeod Resources quarried red marble in River Denys, with a $2-million expansion in 2009 that saw the installation of finishing and polishing equipment. Operations shut down in December 2011 due to insufficient working capital.

== Geography ==
The municipality covers the entire western coast of Cape Breton Island. The rugged western coast borders the eastern extremity of the Gulf of Saint Lawrence, while the eastern side borders Bras d'Or Lake. The land rises to the north, culminating at the Cape Breton Highlands.

As well as Port Hood, site of the municipal offices, populated areas include the fishing ports of Mabou and Judique, and former mining centre Inverness. The municipality contains an Acadian enclave at the ports of Saint-Joseph-du-Moine and Chéticamp.

== Demographics ==
In the Canada 2016 Census, the municipality had a population of 13,190 and 8,842 dwellings, a population drop of 4.3% from 2011. The municipality accounts for 1.5% of the population of Nova Scotia.

== Economy ==
Agriculture, forestry, fishing, and hunting account for 32% of the economy. Other major sectors are construction, retail, accommodation, and food services.

More than 80% by value of Nova Scotia's fishery is in Inverness. The main species are shellfish such as lobster, crab, and scallop.

Ranching and animal production is the main agricultural activity.

In terms of employment by sector, it is: Agriculture, forestry, fishing and hunting 12%; retail 12%; health care 12%; manufacturing 10%; accommodation and food services 9%.

Fifty-seven per cent of the municipality's expenses go towards public housing, more than double the provincial rural average.

In 2020 the municipality received about $1.9 million in infrastructure funding from the government and local groups.

== Infrastructure ==
In 1955 the Canso Causeway brought what would become the Trans-Canada Highway (Nova Scotia Highway 104 and Nova Scotia Highway 105) through the southern part of the municipality. Tracks of the Cape Breton and Central Nova Scotia Railway cross the causeway, but it has not seen much train traffic since 2015.

Policing is provided by the Royal Canadian Mounted Police.

== Education ==
The Université Sainte-Anne in Pointe-de-l'Église, along with the Université de Moncton in New Brunswick are the only French language universities in Atlantic Canada.

== See also ==
- List of historic places in Inverness County
- Landforms of Inverness County
- Royal eponyms in Canada
