= Strathlorne, Nova Scotia =

Community in Nova Scotia, Canada

Coordinates: 46°10′59.58″N 61°17′14.03″W

Strathlorne in Nova Scotia

Strathlorne is a small community in the Canadian province of Nova Scotia, located in Inverness County on Cape Breton Island.

== History ==
Strathlorne was originally known as Broad Cove Intervale, and its name was changed in 1879 in honour of the John Campbell, 9th Duke of Argyll, the Marquis of Lorne. The area was settled by Scottish immigrants.
