= Port Hastings, Nova Scotia =

Community in Nova Scotia, Canada

Coordinates: 45.633°N 61.400°W

Port Hastings in Nova Scotia

Port Hastings is an unincorporated settlement on Cape Breton Island, within the Municipality of the County of Inverness, Canada. The population in 2021 was 90.

The community is located at the eastern end of the Canso Causeway on Cape Breton Island. It is named after Charles Hastings Doyle.

== History ==
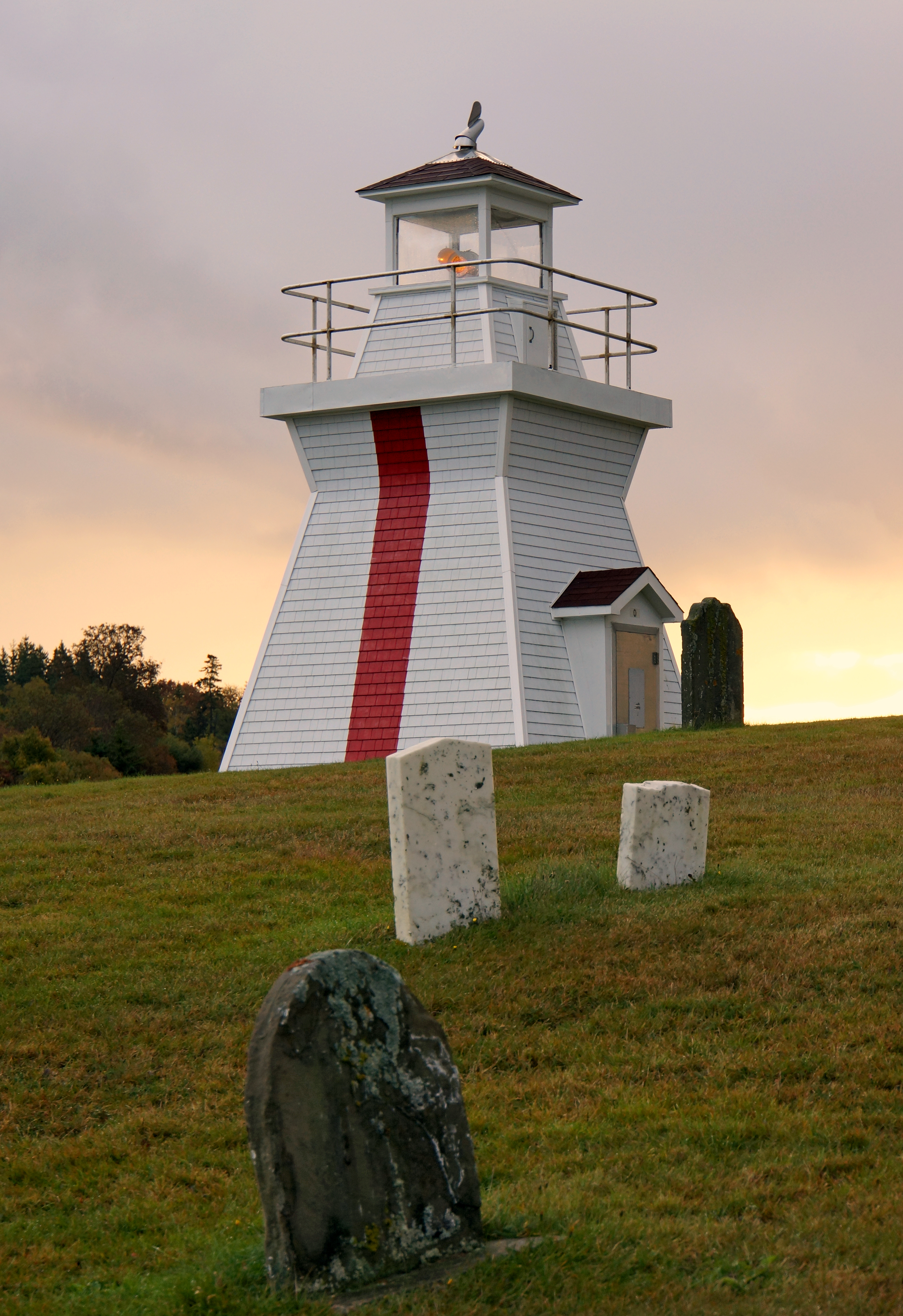
Balache Point lighthouse & cemetery at Canso Canal in Port Hastings

The community was previously known as Plaster Cove. The Inverness and Richmond Railway was built from coal mines in Inverness to a loading dock at Point Tupper in 1901. The construction of the Canso Causeway which opened in 1955 saw the community become a railway junction after the Truro-Sydney mainline of Canadian National Railways (CNR) was diverted from the railcar ferry terminals at Mulgrave and Point Tupper. The CNR line to Inverness was eventually abandoned in the 1980s, although the Truro-Sydney mainline continues to operate under the Cape Breton and Central Nova Scotia Railway.

The construction of the Canso Causeway also brought what would become the Trans-Canada Highway (Highway 104 and Highway 105) through the community.

A traffic circle named the Port Hastings Rotary creates an important interchange between Highway 104, Highway 105, Trunk 19 and Trunk 4 several hundred metres east of the Canso Canal Bridge.

The growth of automobile-focused tourism following World War II saw several motels and gas stations and a tourist information centre located at the traffic circle.

The community is home to the Strait Area Museum, which documents local history, including that of the Canso Causeway.

== Climate ==
Similar to most of Nova Scotia, Port Hastings has a humid continental climate with some maritime influences, including high snowfall in winter and relatively narrow temperature fluctuations by Canadian standards.

Climate data for Port Hastings
Month	Jan	Feb	Mar	Apr	May	Jun	Jul	Aug	Sep	Oct	Nov	Dec	Year
Record high °C (°F)	18.3 (64.9)	16.7 (62.1)	17.8 (64.0)	26.7 (80.1)	31.7 (89.1)	36.1 (97.0)	37.2 (99.0)	32.8 (91.0)	31 (88)	29.4 (84.9)	30 (86)	20.6 (69.1)	37.2 (99.0)
Mean daily maximum °C (°F)	−0.9 (30.4)	−1.6 (29.1)	2.1 (35.8)	7 (45)	13.4 (56.1)	18.7 (65.7)	23 (73)	23 (73)	18.8 (65.8)	13.1 (55.6)	7.3 (45.1)	2.2 (36.0)	10.5 (50.9)
Mean daily minimum °C (°F)	−9 (16)	−9.6 (14.7)	−5.8 (21.6)	−0.7 (30.7)	4 (39)	9 (48)	13.4 (56.1)	13.9 (57.0)	10.1 (50.2)	5.2 (41.4)	0.8 (33.4)	−5 (23)	2.2 (36.0)
Record low °C (°F)	−26.7 (−16.1)	−26.1 (−15.0)	−26.7 (−16.1)	−13.3 (8.1)	−6.7 (19.9)	−2.2 (28.0)	−0.6 (30.9)	1.9 (35.4)	−5.6 (21.9)	−7.2 (19.0)	−12.2 (10.0)	−22.8 (−9.0)	−26.7 (−16.1)
Average precipitation mm (inches)	147.4 (5.80)	107.2 (4.22)	132.3 (5.21)	142.1 (5.59)	106.4 (4.19)	114.2 (4.50)	90.8 (3.57)	111.7 (4.40)	113.6 (4.47)	143.4 (5.65)	163.3 (6.43)	166.2 (6.54)	1,538.5 (60.57)
Source: Environment Canada

== Demographics ==
In the 2021 Census of Population conducted by Statistics Canada, Port Hastings had a population of 90 living in 45 of its 50 total private dwellings, a change of 1.1% from its 2016 population of 89. With a land area of 0.86 km^{2} (0.33 sq mi), it had a population density of 104.7/km^{2} (271.0/sq mi) in 2021.

== Notable residents ==
- Linden MacIntyre, journalist and novelist, grew up in Port Hastings.
- Colin MacLeod (1909–1972), geneticist was born in Port Hastings.
- Angus Walker, country musician, known as "Canada's Prime Minister of Country Music".
