= Judique, Nova Scotia =

Judique
- Community
- Judique in Nova Scotia
- Coordinates: 45°52′34″N 61°29′25″W
- Country: Canada
- Province: Nova Scotia
- Municipality: Municipality of the County of Inverness

Population
  - Total: ca. 700
- Time zone: UTC−4 (AST)
  - Summer (DST): UTC−3 (ADT)
- Canadian Postal Code: B0E 1P0
- Area code: 902
- Telephone Exchange: 787
- NTS Map: 11F14 Whycocomagh
- GNBC Code: CBFJR

Judique (Scottish Gaelic: Siùdaig Mhór) is an unincorporated place within the Municipality of the County of Inverness on Cape Breton Island, Nova Scotia, Canada. It is the site of the Celtic Music Interpretive Centre and a stop on the scenic Ceilidh Trail.

The origin of the name, pronounced /dʒuːˈdɪk/, is uncertain though considered likely to be of Acadian French origin.

Judique presents itself as a collection of buildings with Highway 19 as its main street. It is on the western coast of Cape Breton Island, on the edge of St. George's Bay in the Gulf of Saint Lawrence.

Judique is the site of the Judique Historical Society Building a Maritime Vernacular styled house, notable as the last remaining Port Hood company house.

== Notable residents ==
- Buddy MacMaster (1924–2014), important figure in Cape Breton fiddling.
