= Inverness and Richmond Railway =

Railway in Nova Scotia

Overview
- Locale: Cape Breton Island, Nova Scotia, Canada
- Dates of operation: 1887–1929
- Successor: Canadian National Railway

The Inverness and Richmond Railway was a railway that operated on Cape Breton Island in Nova Scotia from 1901 to the 1980s. It is now a rail trail for snowmobiles, all-terrain vehicles, and human-powered transport called the Celtic Shores Coastal Trail.

== History ==
Service from Port Hawkesbury to Inverness opened in 1901. The purpose of the railway was to haul coal from mines around Mabou and Inverness to a pier in Port Hastings.

It was developed and operated by the Inverness Railway and Coal Company. It connected with existing stations of the Intercolonial Railway at Port Hawkesbury. Although "Inverness and Richmond" refers to two adjacent Cape Breton counties, it was never extended into Richmond County. Expansion plans to connect to the Intercolonial at Orangedale never went beyond the survey stage.

The railway and coal company entered bankruptcy in 1901, and William Mackenzie and Donald Mann, builders of the Canadian Northern Railway, purchased the coal mines and railway and re-organized the property. The railway was never formally integrated into Mackenzie and Mann's Canadian Northern, however.

Peak operation was in 1908 with 322,000 short tons (292,000 t) of freight, mostly coal, but also lumber. The line also carried passengers, averaging 26,530 per year from 1901 to 1906.

Financial difficulties came again during World War I. When Mackenzie and Mann's Canadian Northern was folded into the Canadian National Railway, the Inverness and Richmond initially did not follow. But the CNR took over operations from Mackenzie and Mann in 1920, and after long negotiations over the value of the railway, it was purchased by the Canadian National Railway in 1929. Passenger service ended in 1959. By 1975 service was once a week, hauling coal from St. Rose in the north of the island.
