= Canso Canal Bridge =

Bridge in Canada

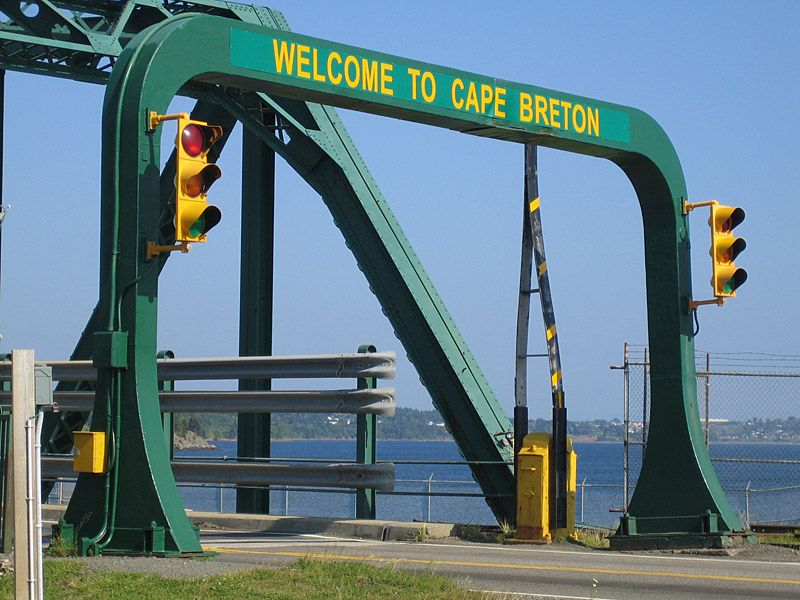
- Coordinates: 45°38′51″N 61°24′45″W
- Carries: Highway 104 (the Trans-Canada Highway) and the Cape Breton and Central Nova Scotia Railway
- Crosses: Canso Canal

Characteristics
- No. of lanes: 2

Rail characteristics
- No. of tracks: 1

History
- Construction end: 1955
- Opened: 18 April 1955
- Inaugurated: 13 August 1955

The Canso Canal Bridge is a rotating swing bridge in Nova Scotia, Canada. It crosses the Canso Canal at the eastern end of the Canso Causeway, connecting the Nova Scotia peninsula to Cape Breton Island. The bridge carries the 2 traffic lanes of Highway 104 (the Trans-Canada Highway) as well as a single track railway line operated by the Cape Breton and Central Nova Scotia Railway (CBNS).

The bridge is owned and maintained by the railway company, although maintenance costs are shared by the Government of Nova Scotia's Department of Transportation and Infrastructure Renewal.

== Dimensions ==
The bridge is a 94 m (308 ft) long swing bridge of a truss design which carries the Trans-Canada Highway road and railway line across the canal immediately south of the southern end of the canal's single lock.

== History ==
The bridge carried its first traffic (a train) on April 18, 1955 when the Canso Causeway construction was completed. Its official opening was on August 13 of that year.

From 1955–1993 the bridge was owned and operated by the Canadian National Railway (CN). Ownership was transferred to the CBNS after that company purchased the Truro-Sydney railway line in 1993.

The railway employs a bridge operator who is required by federal law to rotate the structure to accommodate vessel passage.
