= Orangedale, Nova Scotia =

Community in Nova Scotia, Canada

Coordinates: 45°54′06″N 61°05′42″W

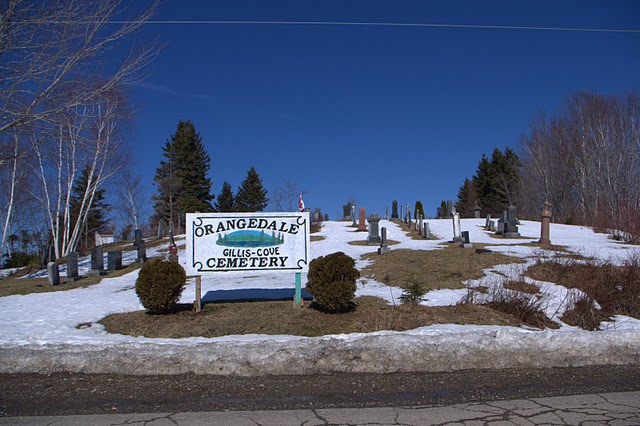
Orangedale Cemetery.

Orangedale is a Canadian rural community located in Inverness County, Nova Scotia.

Originally called "Mull Cove" in honour of the earliest settlers from the Isle of Mull, it was renamed about 1890 to commemorate Orangemen who settled in the vicinity of the Denys Basin of Cape Breton Island's Bras d'Or Lake, Orange Dale was a small farming and fishing community until 1886 when the Intercolonial Railway of Canada mainline from Sydney to Point Tupper was constructed. Orangedale became host to a Victorian-period 2-storey wooden railway passenger station, and it became the preferred stop for many passengers heading to and from central and northern Cape Breton Island.

Orangedale in Nova Scotia

The community developed into a small railway service centre, with the majority of its residents being employed by the railway. The ICR was absorbed into the Canadian National Railways in 1918, and in 1993 CN sold the line to Sydney to the Cape Breton and Central Nova Scotia Railway. Passenger rail service had already stopped following the January 15, 1990 budget cuts by Via Rail Canada.

In 1986, a group of community volunteers formed to save the original ICR station from being demolished. Today it is part of an extensive railway museum.

The Rankin Family's song "Orangedale Whistle" pays homage to the community's role in Cape Breton Island's transportation history. The Museum site has been featured on film through such programs as Maritime Museums(Eastlink), Haunted(Eastlink), and Heather Rankin's My Cape Breton(Bell Fibre). In 2021, the L'Arche community donated the Boston Christmas Tree.
