= Alexander William Chisholm (Canadian politician) =

Canadian politician

Alexander William Chisholm (January 24, 1869 – May 4, 1939) was a Canadian physician and political figure in Nova Scotia. He represented Inverness in the House of Commons of Canada from 1908 to 1925 as a Liberal.

He was born in Margaree Forks, Nova Scotia, the son of William Chisholm, and was educated at Saint Francis Xavier University, Dalhousie University and the Physicians and Surgeons College in Baltimore. In 1904, he married Clara Le Brun. He practised in Margaree Harbour. Chisholm ran unsuccessfully for a seat in the House of Commons in 1904. He was defeated when he ran for reelection in 1925. He died in Margaree Harbour at the age of 70.
