= Dunvegan, Nova Scotia =

Community in Nova Scotia, Canada

Coordinates: 46°18′8″N 61°13′52″W

Dunvegan in Nova Scotia

Dunvegan (/dʌnˈveɪɡən/ dun-VAY-gən) is a small community in the Canadian province of Nova Scotia, located in Inverness County on Cape Breton Island.

The name is derived from Dunvegan (Dùn Bheagan in Scottish Gaelic) on the Isle of Skye in Scotland.
