= Hugh Cameron (politician) =

Canadian politician

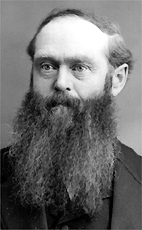

Member of the Canadian Parliament for Inverness
- In office 1867–1872
- Preceded by: Incumbent
- In office 1882–1896

Personal details
- Born: 18 March 1836 Antigonish County, Nova Scotia, Canada
- Died: 11 May 1918 (aged 82)
- Party: Anti-Confederation Party (1867–1869), Liberal-Conservative Party (1869–1887), Conservative Party (1887-1918)
- Education: University of Pennsylvania
- Occupation: medical doctor

Hugh Cameron (18 March 1836 – 11 May 1918) was a Canadian politician and a member of the House of Commons of Canada for the riding of Inverness in Nova Scotia.

He was born in Antigonish County, Nova Scotia, the son of Alexander Cameron and Liz Cameron. Cameron studied at Saint Francis Xavier College and, in 1861, graduated in medicine from the University of Pennsylvania and also from the School of Practical Obstetrics in Philadelphia. He practiced medicine at Mabou in Cape Breton. He studied further at Bellevue Hospital medical school in New York City from 1864 to 1865 before returning to his practice. Cameron also served as surgeon for the militia.

He was elected as a member of the Anti-Confederation Party to the 1st Canadian Parliament on 20 September 1867. He became a member of the Liberal-Conservative Party on 30 January 1869. Though he was defeated in the following three elections, he was re-elected to the 5th Canadian Parliament on 20 June 1882, and to the two following Parliaments. He became a member of the Conservative Party on 13 April 1887. Cameron was appointed in the Legislative Council of Nova Scotia in 1879, serving until 1882.
