= Margaree Harbour, Nova Scotia =

Community in Nova Scotia, Canada

Coordinates: 46°25′58″N 61°6′20″W

Margaree Harbour in Nova Scotia

Margaree Harbour (Scottish Gaelic: Acarsaid Mhargaraidh) is a small community in the Canadian province of Nova Scotia, located in Inverness County on Cape Breton Island.

One of the early names of Margaree Harbour was Havre de Madré, or Magré. The area was referred to as St. Marquerita on eighteenth-century maps.

In 1956, Margaree Harbour had a population of 108 people.
