= Canso Causeway =

Causeway connecting Cape Breton Island with mainland Nova Scotia

Coordinates: 45°38′38″N 61°25′11″W

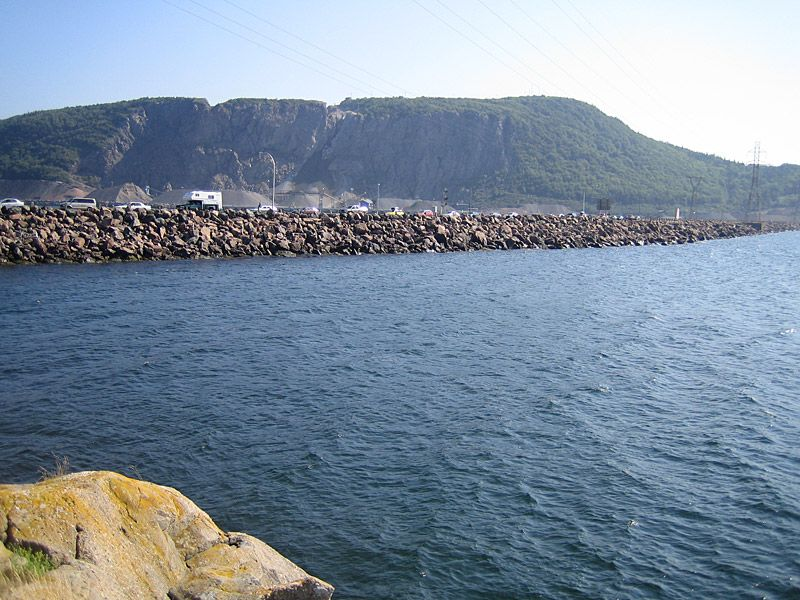
Canso Causeway from Cape Breton Island

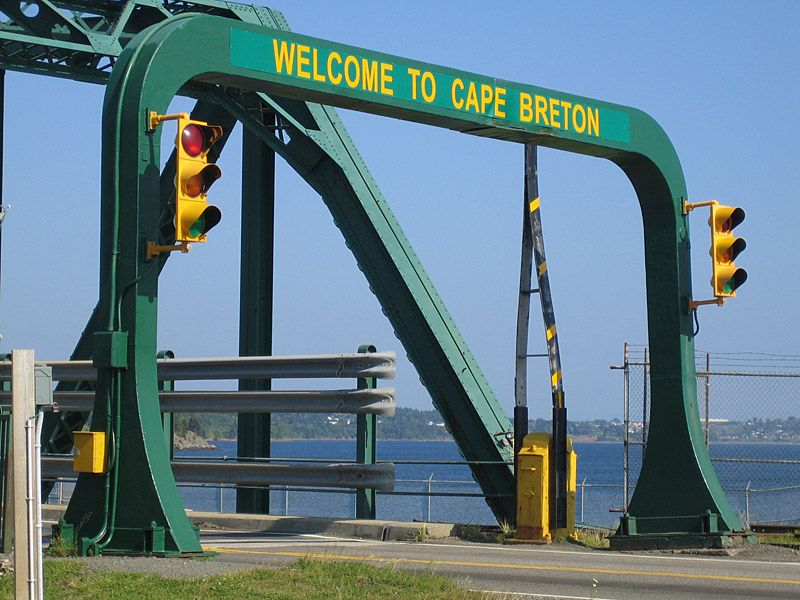
The Canso Canal Bridge crosses the Canso Canal at the eastern end of the causeway. The navigable canal is considered the official dividing line between Cape Breton Island and mainland Nova Scotia.

The Canso Causeway (Scottish Gaelic: Cabhsair Chanso) is a 1,385-metre-long (4,544-foot) rock-fill causeway crossing the Strait of Canso, which provides access by road between Cape Breton Island and the Nova Scotia peninsula.

Its crest thickness is 40 m (130 ft), carrying the two vehicle traffic lanes of the Trans-Canada Highway, Nova Scotia Highway 104 on the mainland side, and Nova Scotia Highway 105 on the Cape Breton side, as well as the single track mainline of the Cape Breton and Central Nova Scotia Railway.

The causeway opened in 1955 after three years of construction. Constructed in an "S" shape, it has a base width of 244 m (801 ft) in waters having a maximum depth of 65 m (213 ft).

Cape Breton Island remains circumnavigable as a result of the 24-metre (79 ft) wide and 570-metre (1,870 ft) long Canso Canal, which is located at the eastern end of the causeway to allow ship traffic to transit the Strait of Canso. The 94-metre (308 ft) Canso Canal Bridge is a swing bridge which carries the road and railway line across the canal.

The word "Canso" is believed to be derived from the Mi'kmaq word kamsok, which means "opposite the lofty cliffs."

On July 2, 2014, it was announced that the Government of Canada would transfer ownership of the causeway to the Nova Scotia provincial government. The federal government will still maintain the Canso Canal and the navigational locks.

== Ferries ==
Prior to the construction of the causeway, Cape Breton Island was connected to the mainland by separate railway car and motor vehicle ferries.

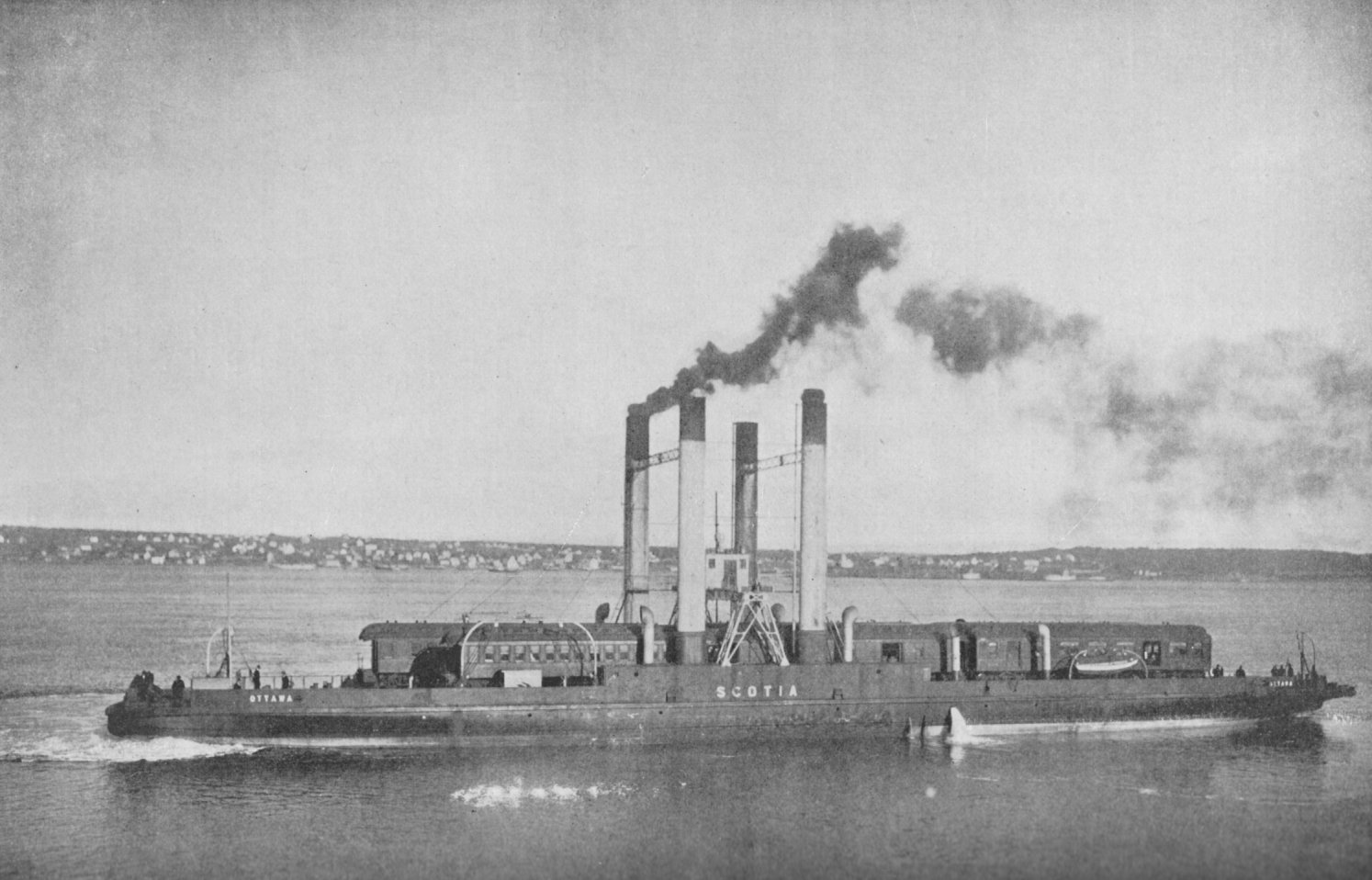
ICR rail ferry Scotia provides service across the Strait of Canso ca. 1903

In 1880, the Intercolonial Railway (ICR) was opened between Mulgrave on the Nova Scotia side, west to New Glasgow. In 1890, the ICR built a line from Point Tupper on the Cape Breton side, east to Sydney. As a result, a rail ferry service was necessary so that rail cars from Cape Breton Island could be interchanged with the mainland North America rail network. Initially a small 2-railcar barge was used, however the growth of traffic from Industrial Cape Breton soon mandated that a dedicated rail ferry service be established. This service was operated by the ICR until 1918 when the ICR was merged into Canadian National Railways (CNR). CNR operated the ferries from 1918 until the causeway opened in 1955. Vessels used included: Mulgrave (1893–1901), Scotia (1903–1955), and Scotia II (1915–1955).

Various private passenger and horse-drawn carriage ferry services operated between Point Tupper or Port Hawkesbury or Port Hastings to the Nova Scotia side. By the 1930s, the Nova Scotia Department of Transportation took responsibility for providing the automobile ferry service. By the 1940s, as a result of war-time travel growth, as well as the growing popularity of automobiles, the service was expanded to 24 hours/day. Toward the end of the service in the 1950s, vessels included the George H. Murray, John Cabot, Ponte de Canseau, and Sir Charles Tupper.

== Proposed bridge ==
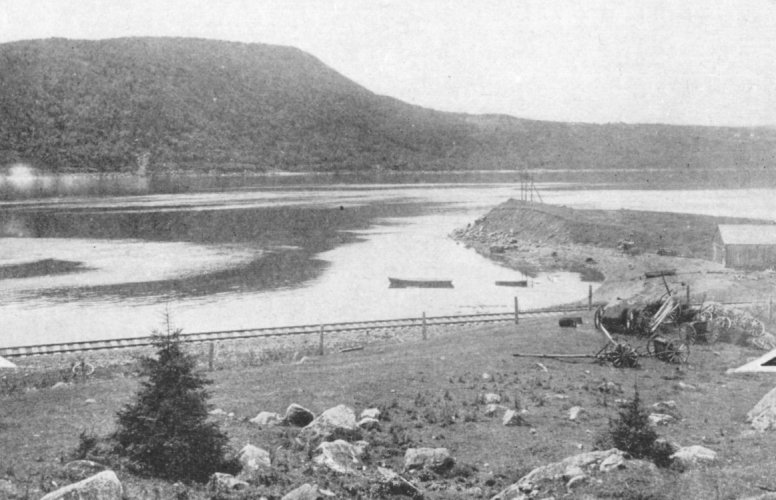
Proposed location for cantilever bridge across the Strait of Canso - generally the same as that ultimately selected for the causeway.

In the late 1890s and early 1900s, the Industrial Cape Breton region was experiencing unprecedented economic growth as a result of multiple coal mines and two large integrated steel mills having opened. The Scotia rail car ferry that entered service in 1901 was struggling to keep up with the demands despite operating 24-hours per day year-round. In 1903, an ambitious proposal was presented to the provincial and federal governments, a proposal known as the "Strait of Canso Bridge", detailing a plan to build a 4,370-foot (1,330 m) steel cantilever bridge at the narrowest portion of the strait to carry the Intercolonial Railway's main line between Sydney and Truro. The span, measuring 1,800 ft (550 m), would have been longer than the Firth of Forth Bridge and roughly similar in size to the Quebec Bridge.

== Construction ==
From 1947 to 1951, articles and cartoons in provincial newspapers indicated that the strait's crossing was to be a bridge. Finally, project engineers agreed that because of the size, the amount of ice, the strength of the currents that filled the Strait of Canso every winter, and the depth of the water, it would be difficult to construct a bridge, and instead, a causeway option was chosen.

The Canso Causeway was built at a narrow location on the Strait of Canso, about 6.6 kilometres (4.1 mi) northwest of Port Hawkesbury and Mulgrave, crossing from Cape Porcupine near Auld's Cove on the mainland side to Port Hastings on the Cape Breton side. About 10,092,000 tonnes (9,933,000 long tons) of rock for building the causeway was quarried from a mountain on Cape Porcupine.

Contracts were awarded from May 1952 to build approach roads and rail lines for the causeway construction, and the project was officially started at a ceremony on September 16, 1952 that was attended by federal Minister of Transport Lionel Chevrier and Premier of Nova Scotia Angus L. MacDonald.

The Strait of Canso was permanently blocked on December 10, 1954, and construction continued through the winter on building the roadway and railway line, as well as finishing the Canso Canal and its swing bridge. Construction was finally completed on April 13, 1955, when the railway line and the roadway were finished at a cost of $22 million.

The first train across the causeway was a Canadian National Railways work train, led by steam locomotive #2639 on April 18, 1955. The railway line across the causeway entered active service on Saturday, May 14, 1955, when the first revenue train was a 10-car passenger train, led by steam locomotive #6014, and the rail ferry service from Mulgrave to Point Tupper was then discontinued. The roadway across the causeway opened to vehicle traffic on May 20, 1955, when the vehicle ferry service was discontinued.

== Official opening ==
The official opening of the Canso Causeway took place on August 13, 1955. Several thousand people attended ceremonies with federal minister C.D. Howe cutting the ceremonial ribbon made of Nova Scotia tartan. The grand opening included a gala parade of what was meant to be 100 bagpipers heralding Cape Breton's road connection to the North American mainland. However, the 100th bagpiper refused to pipe.

== Legacy ==
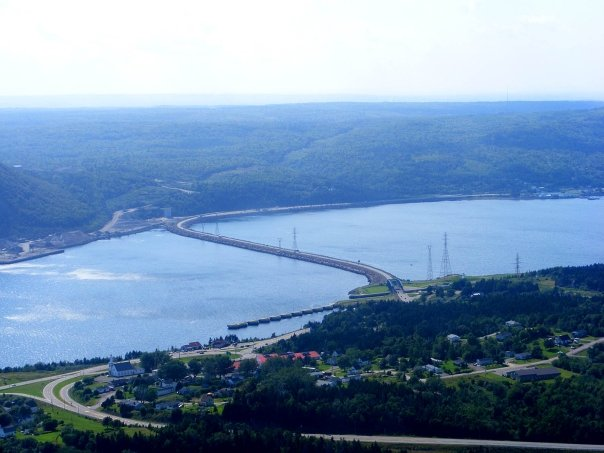
The Canso Causeway viewed from the air, looking northwest toward the Aulds Cove (mainland) side from the Port Hastings (Cape Breton Island) side.

When the causeway was completed, the eastern end of the Strait of Canso became ice free during the winter. Several industries were attracted to the Point Tupper area, including the Stora pulp and paper mill, a Gulf Oil refinery and a heavy water plant.

Aside from blocking sea ice, the blocking of the Strait of Canso caused significant environmental damage from the enormous changes in the tidal regime of the southern Gulf of St. Lawrence all the way to the mouth of the St. Lawrence River. The causeway also had the effect of damming the waterway for migrating ground fish stocks for decades until some of these species were able to determine how to get around Cape Breton Island into the gulf. In addition, the causeway allowed several non-native species of land animals access onto Cape Breton Island. One particularly troublesome interloper has been the bobcat, which has slowly forced the more gentle lynx out of its traditional hunting grounds and up into the Cape Breton Highlands.

From 1955 to the early 1990s, the Canso Causeway charged a toll to motorists. The toll was discontinued after the construction costs (approximately $23 million) were paid off.

In 1993, CN Rail sold its Truro-Sydney railway line which crossed the Canso Causeway to the Cape Breton and Central Nova Scotia Railway. Today, CB&CNS employees operate the swing bridge across the Canso Canal.
