= Inverness County, Nova Scotia =

Inverness County
- County
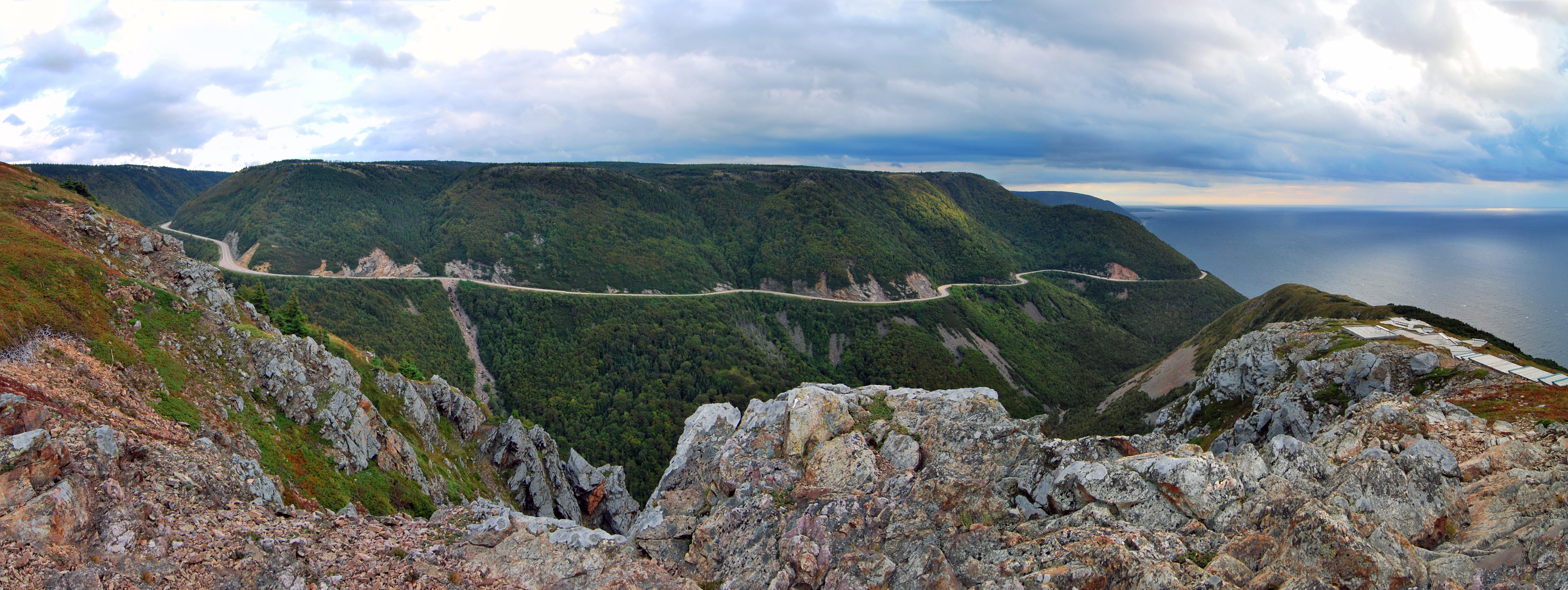
- Cabot Trail seen from the Skyline Trail

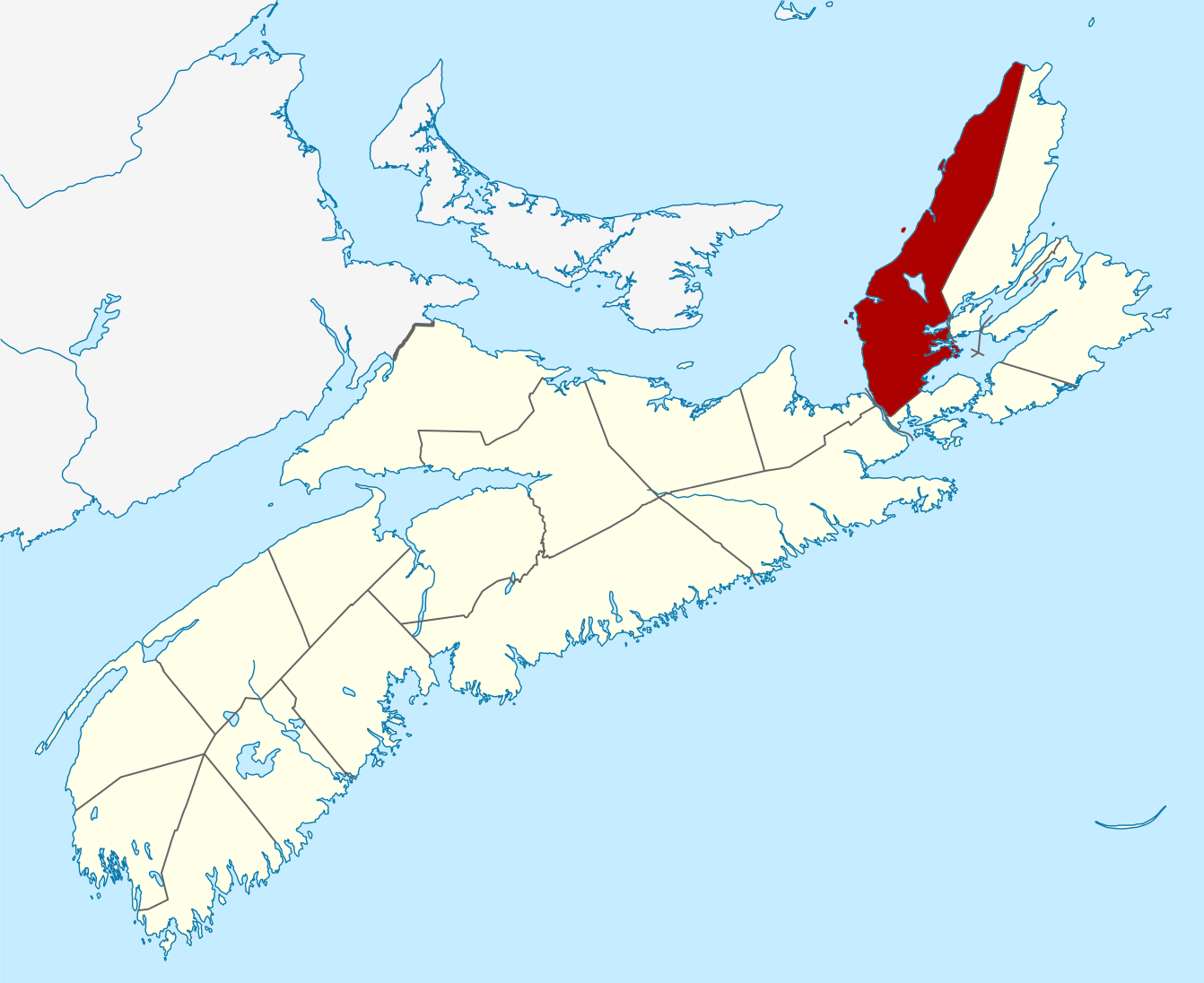
- Location of Inverness County, Nova Scotia
- Coordinates: 46.2°N 61.1°W
- Country: Canada
- Province: Nova Scotia
- Towns: Port Hawkesbury
- Established as Juste au Corps: 1835
- Renamed Inverness: 1837
- Incorporated: 17 April, 1879
- Electoral Districts Federal: Cape Breton—Canso / Sydney—Victoria
- Provincial: Chéticamp-Margarees-Pleasant Bay / Inverness

Government
  - Type: Municipality of the County of Inverness

Area
  - Land: 3,831.17 km^{2} (1,479.22 sq mi)

Population (2021)
  - Total: 17,346
  - Density: 4.5/km^{2} (12/sq mi)
  - Change 2016-21: ▲0.6%
- Time zone: UTC-4 (AST)
  - Summer (DST): UTC-3 (ADT)
- Area code: 902
- Dwellings: 9,876
- Median Income*: $45,687 CDN
- Median household income, 2005 (all households)

Inverness County is a historical county and census division of Nova Scotia, Canada located on Cape Breton Island. Local government is provided by the Municipality of the County of Inverness, the town of Port Hawkesbury and the Whycocomagh 2 Waycobah First Nation reserve.

== History ==
Established as the County of Juste au Corps in 1835, Inverness County was given its present name in 1837. It was named after Sir Cameron Inverness of Scotland, the land from which many of the early settlers came. Agriculture and fishing dominated the economy with exports of butter and cattle to Newfoundland and Halifax for most of the nineteenth century. The construction of the Inverness and Richmond Railway in 1901, and the subsequent opening of coal mines at Port Hood, Mabou, and Inverness, created the "only home market" local farmers had ever had.

The boundaries of Inverness County had been previously defined when Cape Breton Island was divided by statute into three districts in 1823. In 1996, the county was amalgamated into a single municipality with the exception of Port Hawkesbury.

== Communities ==
Towns

- Port Hawkesbury

Reserves

- Whycocomagh 2

County municipality and subdivisions

- Municipality of the County of Inverness
  - Inverness Subdivision A
  - Inverness Subdivision B
  - Inverness Subdivision C

== Demographics ==
As a census division in the 2021 Census of Population conducted by Statistics Canada, Inverness County had a population of 17,346 living in 7,693 of its 9,737 total private dwellings, a change of 0.6% from its 2016 population of 17,235. With a land area of 3,817.61 km^{2} (1,473.99 sq mi), it had a population density of 4.5/km^{2} (11.8/sq mi) in 2021.

Forming the majority of the Inverness County census division, the Municipality of the County of Inverness, including its Subdivisions A, B, and C, had a population of 13,239 living in 5,989 of its 7,914 total private dwellings, a change of 0.5% from its 2016 population of 13,170. With a land area of 3,795.34 km^{2} (1,465.39 sq mi), it had a population density of 3.5/km^{2} (9.0/sq mi) in 2021.

Population trend

Census	Population	Change (%)
2021	17,346	▲0.6%
2016	17,235	▼4.0%
2011	17,947	▼5.7%
2006	19,036	▼4.5%
2001	19,937	▼4.7%
1996	20,918	▼3.2%
1991	21,620	▼1.5%
1986	21,946	▼1.8%
1981	22,337	N/A
1941	20,573	
1931	21,055	
1921	23,808	
1911	25,571	
1901	24,353	
1891	25,779	
1881	25,651	
1871	23,415	N/A

Native language (2011)

Language	Population	Pct (%)
English only	14,360	81.31%
French only	2,315	13.11%
Non-official languages	825	4.67%
Multiple responses	165	0.93%

Ethnic groups (2006)

Ethnic origin	Population	Pct (%)
Scottish	9,365	49.9%
Canadian	6,460	34.5%
French	4,620	24.6%
English	3,880	20.7%
Irish	3,680	19.6%
Acadian	1,180	6.3%
North American Indian	910	4.9%
German	580	3.1%
Dutch (Netherlands)	555	3.0%

== Transport ==
- Highways
  - Hwy 105 (TCH)
- Trunk routes
  - Trunk 4
  - Trunk 19
  - Cabot Trail
- Collector routes:
  - Route 219
  - Route 223
  - Route 252
  - Route 395

== See also ==
- Cabot Trail: scenic route which passes through the area
- Communities in Inverness County
- List of municipalities in Nova Scotia
- People from Inverness County
