= Boston Christmas Tree =

Official Christmas tree of Boston, Massachusetts

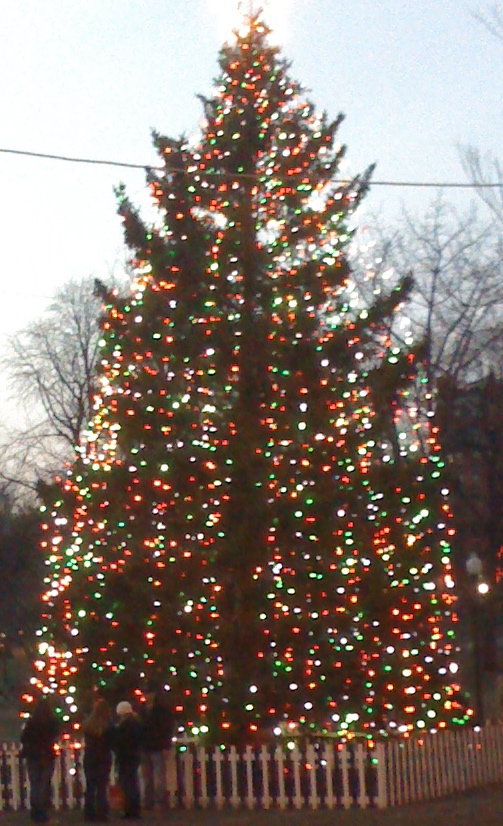
- Status: Active
- Frequency: Annual
- Locations: Nova Scotia and Boston Common
- Coordinates: 42°21′20.8322″N 71°3′48.4488″W
- Country: United States and Canada
- Inaugurated: 1941; 85 years ago
- Participants: Mayor of Boston, Premier of Nova Scotia, Santa Claus
- Attendance: 20,000 (lighting)
- Budget: CA$242,000

The Boston Christmas Tree is the City of Boston, Massachusetts' official Christmas tree. A tree has been lit each year since 1941, and since 1971 it has been given to the people of Boston by the people of Nova Scotia in thanks for their assistance after the 1917 Halifax Explosion. The tree is lit in the Boston Common throughout the Christmas season.

== Halifax explosion ==
On December 6, 1917, at 9:04:35 am, the Halifax Explosion severely destroyed much of the city by the largest non-nuclear explosion of all time. Boston authorities learned of the disaster by telegraph, and quickly organized and dispatched a relief train around 10 pm to assist survivors. A blizzard delayed the train, which finally arrived in the early morning of December 8 and immediately began distributing food, water, and medical supplies. Numerous personnel on the train were able to relieve the Nova Scotia medical staff, most of whom had worked without rest since the explosion occurred. Nova Scotian children study the explosion in school and know that "Boston was one of the first responders, and really a lifesaver."

== Donation ==
Year	Tree location	Donor
2026	East Amherst	Henry and Pat Knol
2025	Lunenburg	Claire and Ronald Feener
2024	Mattie Settlement, Antigonish County	Hugh and Liz Ryan
2023	Stewiacke	Bette Gourley (Note: The Gourley family waited 10 years for their tree to be tall enough to be selected and sent to Boston, saying it was "a big honor.")
2022	Christmas Island	Townsend family (Note: Roddy Townsend, the property owner, and his children Angela, Carmen and Andrew.)
2021	Orangedale, Inverness County	L'Arche, Cape Breton
2020	Grande Anse, Richmond County	Heather and Tony Sampson
2019	Black Point, Pictou County	Desmond Waithe and Corina Saunders
2018	Oxford, Cumberland County	Ross McKellar and Teresa Simpson
2017	Blue's Mills, Inverness County	Bob and Marion Campbell
2016	Ainslie Glen, Cape Breton Island	Crown land
2015	Pictou County	Andrea and William MacEachern
2014	Purlbrook, Antigonish County	John and Ethel Ann MacPherson
2013	Mill Cove	Mary Lou Milligan
2011	Central Argyle	Ken and Donna Spinney
2010	North Alton	Gary and Roseann Misner
2008	Clementsvale, Annapolis County	Craig and Marina Cook
2007	Annapolis Valley	Christopher and Lisa Hamilton
2006	New Ross	Alan and Antoinette Broome
1972	Lunenburg County	Joseph Slauenwhite
1971	Lunenburg County	Joseph Slauenwhite

Nova Scotia donated a large Christmas tree to the city of Boston in thanks and remembrance for the help Boston Red Cross and the Massachusetts Public Safety Committee provided immediately after the Halifax Explosion of 1917. Another tree was sent in 1971, and every year since.

The annual gift was started by the Lunenburg County Christmas Tree Producers Association to promote Christmas tree exports as well as acknowledge the Boston support after the explosion. The gift was taken over by the Nova Scotia Government in 1976 to continue the goodwill gesture and to promote trade and tourism.

In 2017, in honor of the 100th anniversary of the explosion, Boston Mayor Marty Walsh, Halifax Mayor Michael Savage, and Nova Scotia Premier Stephen McNeil unveiled a plaque on the Boston Common near the site of the tree. The tree that year was donated in honor of first responders in the two cities.

Joseph Slauenwhite donated the first two trees. The tree typically comes from the southern half of the province, but in 2014 the tree came from Antigonish County, in the north and in 2016 the first tree ever from Cape Breton Island was selected. In 2018, the first tree from Cumberland County was donated.

The province also donates smaller trees to Rosie's Place and the Pine Street Inn, homeless shelters in Boston.

== Tree selection ==
The Christmas Tree Extension Specialist whose responsibility it is to select a tree is "always looking" for trees, and keeps a list of trees for years. They also receive between 8-10 families a year who volunteer their own tree. The scouting for the current year's tree begins in June and July.

Most donors are "honored to give up their trees... [and] most will gladly watch their towering trees fall" since everyone knows the reason it is being sent to Boston. Owners often would not normally "have dreamed of cutting down the big spruce Grandpa planted" but will "gladly part with it" when told it is going to Boston.

They "consider it a great honor" and say, 'Oh, my God, how can I refuse?"' It is sometimes donated in memory of a family member who died in the explosion. The process can be political as families vie to have their tree chosen. One Nova Scotian said it would be "a sin" not to send a tree.

=== Specifications ===
Knowing its symbolic importance to both jurisdictions, the Nova Scotia Department of Natural Resources has specific guidelines for selecting the tree. It must be an attractive balsam fir, white spruce or red spruce, 12 to 16 meters (39 to 52 feet) tall, healthy with good color, medium to heavy density, uniform and symmetrical and easy to access. The trees do not usually come from tree farms, but from open land where they can grow tall and full.

=== Christmas Tree Specialist ===
The Nova Scotia Department of Natural Resources Christmas Tree Specialist has the responsibility for selecting the tree each year. For the specialist the "tree can be elusive, the demands excessive, and the job requires remembering the locations of the best specimens in the province and persuading the people who own them to give them up for a pittance." The first Specialist was Tom Ernst, and he was followed in the 1990s by Peter Romkey. As of 2017, the Christmas Tree Extension Specialist responsible for selecting the Boston tree is Ross H. Pentz, a position he has held since 2001.

== Tree cutting and ceremony ==
Before the tree is cut, each branch is individually tied to the trunk. It takes two men a day and a half to prepare the tree to be cut down. A crane holds the tree at the top while it is cut at the base by a chainsaw.

The tree cutting ceremony has been described as "quite the local spectacle for Nova Scotians," and features representatives from the province, the United States Consulate in Halifax, the Christmas Tree Council of Nova Scotia, hundreds of local school children, a town crier, Royal Canadian Mounted Police, Nova Scotia conservation officers, an Antigonish bagpiper, the Nova Scotia Mass Choir, and Santa Claus. (Note: The Tree's official twitter feed has a video of the tree being cut in 2017.)

In 2014, students and staff in the environmental technologies program at the Nova Scotia Community College Strait Area Campus cut down that year's tree. As of 2025, Waddie Long, a Nova Scotia Community College instructor, had cut down the tree for most of the previous decade. Also in 2025, Michelle Wu became the first mayor of Boston to attend the tree cutting ceremony, and helped Long wield the chainsaw.

== Transporting the tree ==
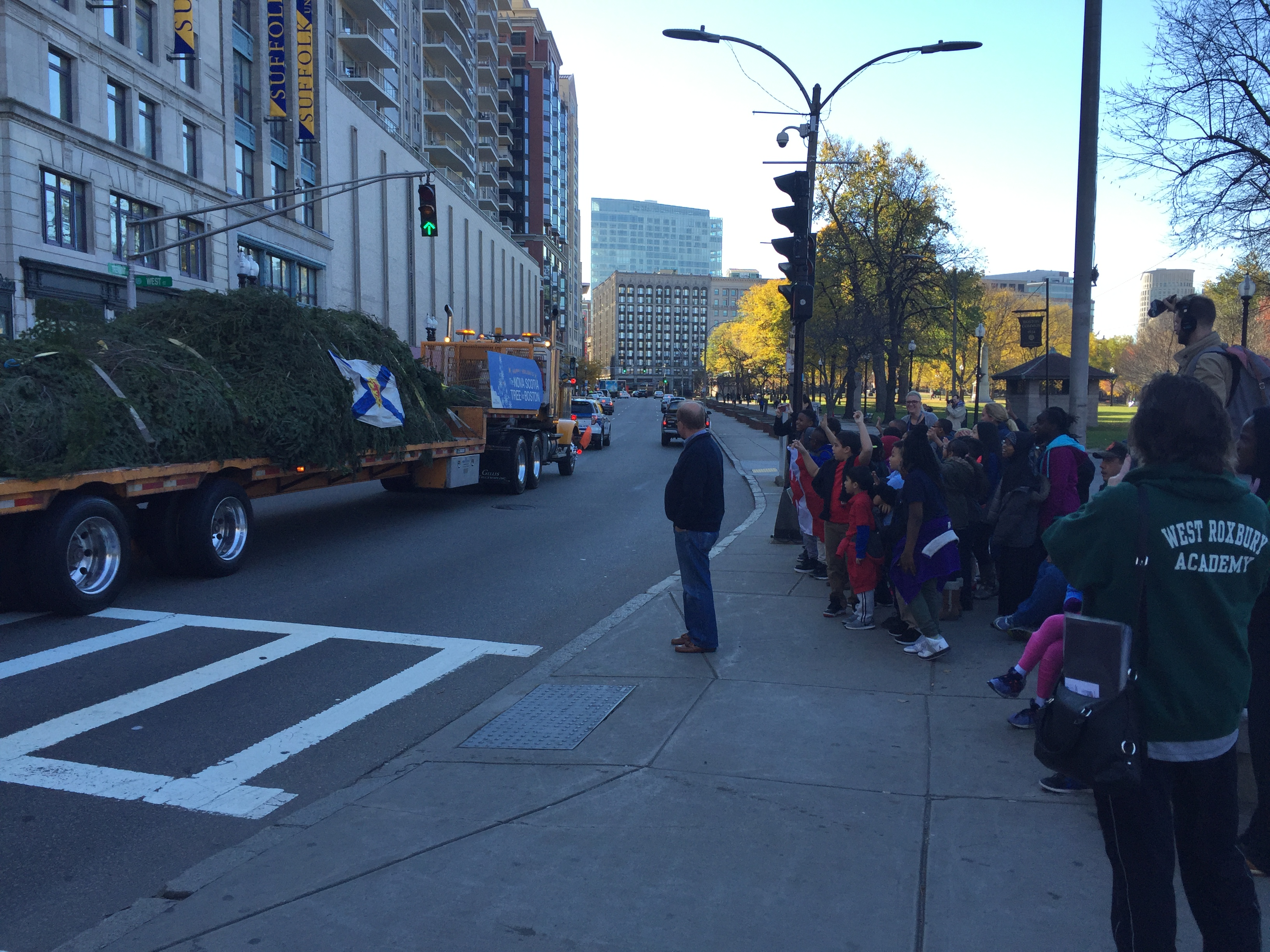
School children from the Mather Elementary School wave to the tree from Tremont Street on the Boston Common

The tree travels over 750 miles (1,200 km) to Boston, with a stop at the Grand Parade in Halifax for a public send-off ceremony featuring a live musical performance by The Stanfields. Attendees are also invited to sign a thank you book for Boston. The tree travels by truck across Nova Scotia, then cruises on a ferry across the Bay of Fundy, continuing by truck through Maine and New Hampshire to Boston. People stand on the sides of roads and on highway overpasses to get a glimpse of the tree and to take pictures.

In 2013, the tree was led out of Halifax by a group of runners in honor of victims of the Boston Marathon bombing. Special permits are required to transport the tree through Nova Scotia, New Brunswick, and Maine.

== Tree arrival and lighting ==
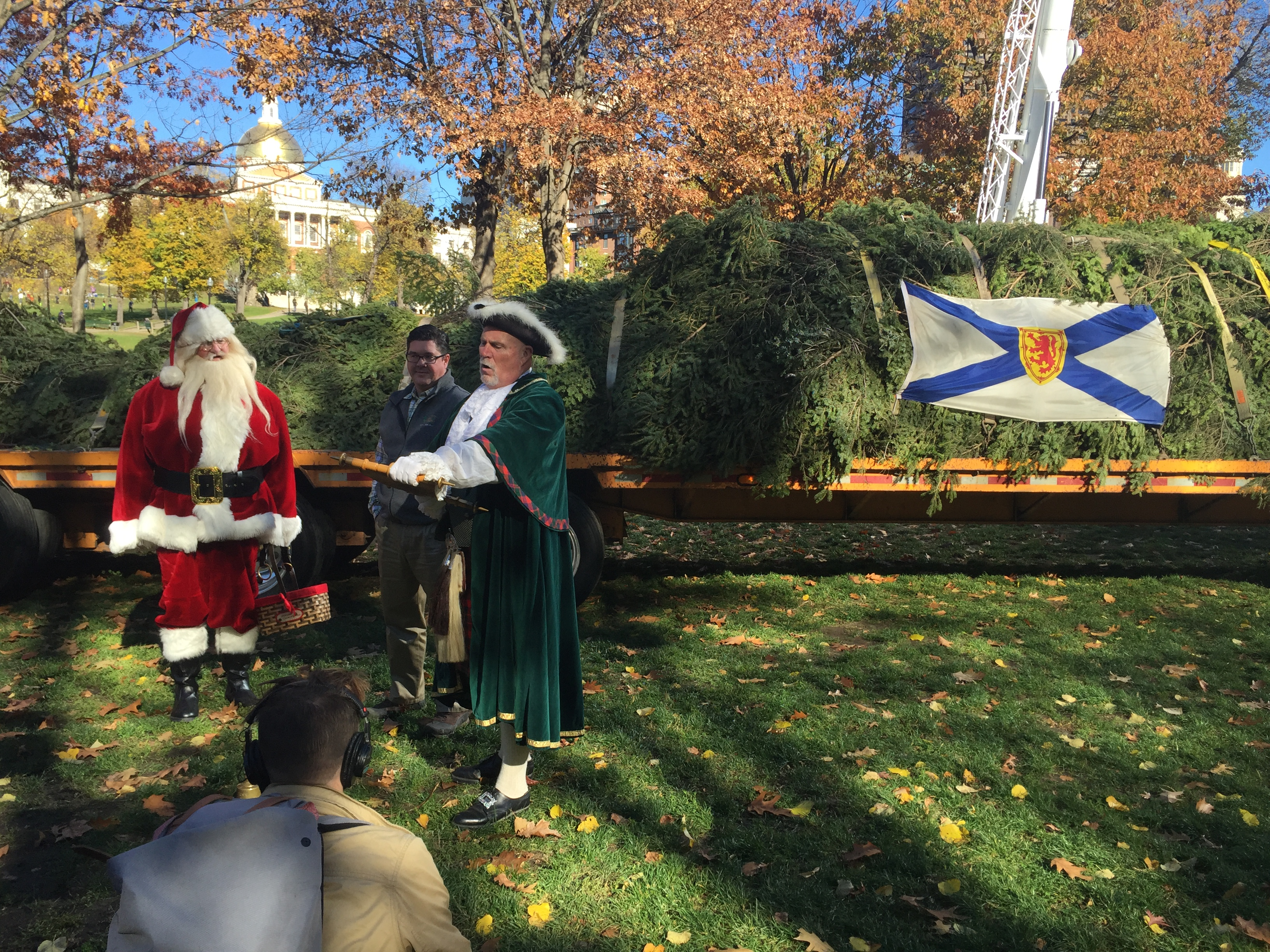
A Town Crier and Santa Claus welcome the Boston Christmas Tree on the Boston Common.

The tree arrives in Boston under police escort. In the same way that schoolchildren see the tree off in Nova Scotia, schoolchildren from Boston are on hand to welcome it to the Boston Common.

The tree lighting takes place on the Common in late November or early December. The event attracts about 20,000 people and 200,000 watch the broadcast on WCVB. The 1998 tree required more than 3,200 man hours to decorate, as well as 4 1/2 miles (7 km) of wire and 17,000 multi-colored lights. The 2006 tree was covered in 8,000 bulbs.

The tree donated by Nova Scotia was placed at the Prudential Center from 1971 until 2002, when it was moved to the Boston Common because of planned development.

== Significance to Nova Scotia ==
The tree is so important to the people of Nova Scotia that "people have cried over it, argued about it, even penned song lyrics in its honour." Lands and Forestry Minister Iain Rankin called it "one of our proudest traditions." A spokesman for the Department of Lands and Forestry said "It never ceases to amaze me how excited people get about it every year. The whole province gets excited about the tree. It’s a big deal."

== Expense ==
While the donation of the Christmas Tree is first and foremost a gift, it is also a major marketing effort for Nova Scotia. In 2015, the total cost of the tree, transportation, ceremonies, and parties was CA$242,000(US$179,000).

The scouting of the tree costs CA$1,900, and the cutting ceremony was CA$2,500. For all of their coverage and efforts, CTV Atlantic received CA$25,000. Promotion on Facebook and Instagram cost an additional CA$900. The sendoff in Halifax cost CA$10,000 and transporting the tree cost CA$4,000. Merchandise was given away at events in both Massachusetts and Nova Scotia, including tuques at a cost of CA$11,000, flags at CA$1,000 and lanyards at CA$3,000.

Provincial officials, including the premier and his staff, were flown to Boston and put up in local hotels at an expense of CA$12,000. The MacEachern family also received CA$1,000 in travel expenses. WCVB, the Boston ABC affiliate received US$55,000 (CA$75,000) to broadcast a live one-hour tree lighting special. A television commercial promoting Nova Scotia would cost about four times as much. The ceremony itself cost US$30,000 (CA$41,000), which was paid by Nova Scotia to the City of Boston. This is less than half of the US$85,000 the ceremony costs.

A reception at the Omni Parker House cost CA$9,000. It was attended by the official delegation, as well as Nova Scotian businessmen who traveled at their own expense, and Nova Scotians living in the Boston area.

Given the media coverage the province gets in return, and “When you look at the entire scope of the thing, it’s a pretty good value for the province of Nova Scotia,” according to Ed McHugh, who teaches business and marketing at Nova Scotia Community College.

== Media coverage ==
Since 1996, Boston TV Stations such as WBZ-TV and WCVB-TV have aired the Nova Scotia Tree for Boston via cable in Atlantic Canada.

The "regional media coverage [of the tree cutting ceremony is] huge." Television personalities from CTV Atlantic host the tree cutting ceremony and the send off in Halifax. In addition, their contract commits them to doing weather items and "tree related elements" live from Boston during the evening news on both the day of the lighting and the day after. In 2015, CTV produced and aired a 30-second commercial over a period of 10 days. They also provided digital promotion and news promotions. CTV estimates that this contribution represents a CA$30,000 benefit to the province.

The tree is also promoted on Facebook and Instagram.

== See also ==
- Boston–Halifax relations
- List of individual trees
