= Yorke Peninsula Football League =

- Current season, competition or edition: 2026
- Sport: Australian rules football
- Founded: 1910; 116 years ago
- First season: 1910
- President: Brad Haylock
- Most recent champion: Kadina (2026)
- Most titles: CMS Crows (7)
- Website: ypfl.com

The Yorke Peninsula Football League (YPFL) is an Australian rules football competition based in the Yorke Peninsula region of South Australia, Australia. It is an affiliated member of the South Australian National Football League. The league was known as the Yorke Valley Football League until 1996, having previously absorbed the Yorke Peninsula Football Association in 1961, and the Southern Yorke Peninsula Football League in 1994.

== Media ==
At the moment there are several different services covering the YPFL, the main one being the Yorke Peninsula Country Times (Newspaper)

== Brief history ==
The current Yorke Peninsula Football League developed over a number of years and involved the gradual amalgamation of the Yorke Valley Football Association, Yorke Peninsula Football Association, and Southern Yorke Peninsula Football League.

The Yorke Valley Football League began life as the Central Yorke Peninsula Football Association in 1910, with the found clubs being Maitland, Port Victoria, Point Pearce, Ardrossan and Weetulta. A year later the name would be changed to the Northern Yorke Peninsula Football Association.

Curramulka and Minlaton joined in 1923, which saw the name of the NYPFA change to the Northern and Mid Yorke Peninsula Football Association. The Yorke Valley name was first adopted in 1930.

The Yorke Valley Football Association disbanded in 1936, but was reformed in 1945. In 1961 the Association absorbed the four remaining clubs of the Yorke Peninsula Football Association as well as Bute and Alford from the disbanded Western Areas FA a year later. The Association changed its name to Yorke Valley Football League in 1963. Alford and Point Pearce both folded after 1962, followed by Price after 1971 and Port Victoria after 1985.

In 1994 the Yorke Valley Football League absorbed the Southern Yorke Peninsula. At that time the participating clubs were:

- Ardrossan
- Arthurton
- Bute
- CMS (a new club, resulting from the merger of Curramulka, Minlaton and Stansbury)
- Kadina
- Maitland
- Moonta
- Paskeville
- Southern Eagles (a new club, resulting from the merger of Edithburgh, Western United and Yorketown)
- Wallaroo

In 1996, the YVFL changed its name to the current title.

At the end of the 1996 season the Central Yorke Football Club was formed from a merger between Arthurton and Maitland.

== Clubs ==
=== Locations ===
Locations of the River Murray FL clubs

=== Current ===
Club	Colours	Nickname	Home Ground	Former League	Est.	Years in YVFL/YPFL	YVFL/YPFL Senior Premierships	
Club	Colours	Nickname	Home Ground	Former League	Est.	Years in YVFL/YPFL	Total	Years
Ardrossan		Kangaroos	William Miller Oval, Ardrossan	–	1904	1910-1930, 1932-1936, 1946–	14	1913, 1915, 1921, 1926, 1956, 1965, 1967, 1968, 1970, 1971, 1972, 1974, 1989, 2004
Bute		Roosters	Billy Harris Memorial Oval, Bute	WAFA, APFL	1892	1962–2019; 2021–	5	1969, 1973, 1978, 1991, 1993
Central Yorke		Cougars	Maitland Oval, Maitland	–	1996	1997–	1	2007
CMS		Crows	Curramulka Oval, Curramulka; Minlaton Oval, Minlaton and Stansbury Oval, Stansbury	–	1994	1994–	7	1999, 2003, 2006, 2012, 2013, 2021, 2025
Kadina		Bloods, Bloodhounds	Kadina Oval, Kadina	YPFA	1878	1961–	6	1984, 2002, 2010, 2011, 2017, 2023, 2026
Moonta		Demons	Moonta Football Oval, Moonta	YPFA	1895	1961–	6	1963, 2005, 2016, 2018, 2022, 2024
Paskeville		Magpies	Paskeville Oval, Paskeville	YPFA	1910	1961–	7	1962, 1964, 1985, 1987, 2001, 2014, 2015
Southern Eagles		Eagles	Warooka Oval, Warooka; Yorketown Oval, Yorketown and Edithburgh Oval, Edithburgh	–	1994	1994–	4	1995, 2008, 2009, 2019
Wallaroo		Bulldogs	Wallaroo Oval, Wallaroo	YPFA	1888	1961–	8	1976, 1983, 1990, 1992, 1996, 1997, 1998, 2000

=== Former clubs ===
Club	Colours	Nickname	Home Ground	Former League	Est.	Years in YVFL/YPFL	YVFL/YPFL Senior Premierships		Fate
Club	Colours	Nickname	Home Ground	Former League	Est.	Years in YVFL/YPFL	Total (Note: Since 1961)	Years	Fate
Alford		Hawks	Alford Oval, Alford	WAFA	1907	1962	0	-	Folded in 1962
Arthurton	(1947-?)(1960s)(?-1996)	Tigers	Arthurton Oval, Arthurton	NWFA	1907	1947-1996	4	1955, 1982, 1986, 1988	Merged with Maitland in 1996 to form Central Yorke
Curramulka		Magpies	Curramulka Oval, Curramulka	SYPFA	1888	1923-1936	5	1929, 1930, 1934, 1935, 1936	Moved to Yorke Peninsula FA in 1937
Maitland		Lions	Maitland Oval, Maitland	YPFA	1880	1910-1936, 1946-1996	14	1910, 1911, 1922, 1923, 1924, 1931, 1932, 1933, 1950, 1951, 1952, 1980, 1981, 1994	Played in Yorke Peninsula FA in 1937-40. Merged with Arthurton in 1996 to form Central Yorke
Minlaton			Minlaton Oval, Minlaton	SYPFA	1903	1923-1932	1	1925	Returned to Southern Yorke Peninsula FA in 1933
Point Pearce		Tigers	Point Pearce Oval, Point Pearce	–	1893	1910-1926, 1931-1936, 1946-1962	10	1912, 1914, 1919, 1920, 1946, 1948, 1953, 1957, 1958, 1960	Barred from re-entry in 1927. Recess between 1927-30 and 1937-45. Folded in 1962
Port Victoria		Maroons	Port Victoria Oval, Port Victoria	YPFA	1910	1907-1936, 1946-1985	10	1928, 1947, 1949, 1954, 1959, 1961, 1966, 1975, 1977, 1979	Recess in 1937-38, re-formed in Yorke Peninsula FA in 1939. Folded in 1985
Price		Eagles	Price Oval, Price	EYPFA, NWFA	1913	1920, 1946-1964, 1968-1971	0	-	Returned to Eastern Yorke Peninsula FA in 1921. Recess between 1965-67. Folded in 1971
Weetulta				–	1910	1910	0	-	Recess in 1911-12. Re-formed in Eastern Yorke Peninsula FA in 1913
Yorke Valley Ramblers			Maitland Oval, Maitland	–	1912	1912	0	-	Moved to Eastern Yorke Peninsula FA as Maitland B in 1913

=== Premierships ===
Year	A Grade Premier (Runner Up)	B Grade	Senior Colts	Junior Colts	Mini League	Venue
Central Yorke Peninsula Football Association (1910)
1910	Maitland					
Northern Yorke Peninsula Football Association (1911-24)
1911	Maitland					
1912	Point Pearce					
1913	Ardrossan					
1914	Point Pearce					
1915	Ardrossan					
1916-18	Recess (WWI)					
1919	Point Pearce					
1920	Point Pearce					
1921	Ardrossan					
1922	Maitland					
1923	Maitland					
1924	Maitland					
Northern & Mid Yorke Peninsula Football Association (1925-29)
1925	Minlaton					
1926	Ardrossan					
1927	Maitland					
1928	Port Victoria					
1929	Curramulka					
Yorke Valley Football Association (1930-62)
1930	Curramulka					
1931	Maitland					
1932	Maitland					
1933	Maitland					
1934	Curramulka					
1935	Curramulka					
1936	Curramulka					
1937-45)	Recess					
1946	Point Pearce					
1947	Port Victoria					
1948	Point Pearce					
1949	Port Victoria					
1950	Maitland					
1951	Maitland					
1952	Maitland					
1953	Point Pearce					
1954	Port Victoria					
1955	Arthurton					
1956	Ardrossan					
1957	Point Pearce					
1958	Point Pearce					
1959	Port Victoria					
1960	Point Pearce					
1961	Port Victoria (Kadina)	Maitland	Kadina			
1962	Paskeville (Kadina)	Moonta	Wallaroo			
Yorke Peninsula Football League (1963-95)
1963	Moonta (Kadina)	Moonta	Paskeville	Maitland		
1964	Paskeville (Moonta)	Moonta	Wallaroo	Maitland		
1965	Ardrossan (Kadina)	Maitland	Kadina	Port Victoria		
1966	Port Victoria (Ardrossan)	Paskeville	Maitland	Ardrossan		
1967	Ardrossan (Maitland)	Paskeville	Ardrossan	Ardrossan		
1968	Ardrossan (Moonta)	Maitland	Ardrossan	Bute		
1969	Bute (Ardrossan)	Bute	Ardrossan	Bute		
1970	Ardrossan (Bute)	Bute	Bute	Kadina		
1971	Ardrossan (Bute)	Bute	Bute	Kadina		
1972	Ardrossan (Bute)	Bute	Port Victoria	Moonta		
1973	Bute (Ardrossan)	Bute	Kadina	Maitland		
1974	Ardrossan (Bute)	Bute	Moonta	Kadina		
1975	Port Victoria (Ardrossan)	Maitland	Maitland	Maitland		
1976	Wallaroo (Paskeville)	Kadina	Maitland	Maitland		
1977	Port Victoria (Kadina)	Kadina	Maitland	Maitland		
1978	Bute (Ardrossan)	Ardrossan	Bute/Paskeville	Maitland	Maitland	
1979	Port Victoria (Maitland)	Ardrossan	Maitland	Moonta		
1980	Maitland (Ardrossan)	Maitland	Maitland	Kadina		
1981	Maitland (Ardrossan)	Maitland	Wallaroo	Maitland		
1982	Arthurton (Maitland)	Wallaroo	Kadina	Kadina		
1983	Wallaroo (Maitland)	Moonta	Kadina	Ardrossan		
1984	Kadina (Arthurton)	Kadina	Maitland	Ardrossan		
1985	Paskeville (Kadina)	Paskeville	Ardrossan	Port Victoria		
1986	Arthurton (Paskeville)	Ardrossan	Bute	Arthurton		
1987	Paskeville (Maitland)	Maitland	Wallaroo	Arthurton		
1988	Arthurton (Maitland)	Ardrossan	Wallaroo	Paskeville		
1989	Ardrossan (Paskeville)	Maitland	Ardrossan	Kadina		
1990	Wallaroo (Ardrossan)	Wallaroo	Bute	Kadina		
1991	Bute (Wallaroo)	Bute	Maitland	Wallaroo		
1992	Wallaroo (Bute)	Maitland	Kadina	Kadina		
1993	Bute (Wallaroo)	Arthurton	Wallaroo	Kadina		
1994	Maitland (Wallaroo)	Southern Eagles	CMS Crows	CMS Crows	Southern Eagles	Moonta
1995	Southern Eagles (Wallaroo)	CMS Crows	Kadina	CMS Crows	CMS Crows	
Yorke Peninsula Football League (1996-)
1996	Wallaroo (CMS Crows)	Wallaroo	Southern Eagles	Southern Eagles	CMS Crows	Bute Oval
1997	Wallaroo (CMS Crows)	Wallaroo	Central Yorke	Southern Eagles	CMS Crows	Moonta Oval
1998	Wallaroo (CMS Crows)	Wallaroo	Central Yorke	CMS Crows	CMS Crows	Maitland Oval
1999	CMS Crows (Bute)	CMS Crows	CMS Crows	CMS Crows	CMS Crows	Kadina Oval
2000	Wallaroo (Kadina)	CMS Crows	Central Yorke	Central Yorke	CMS Crows	Minlaton Oval
2001	Paskeville (Kadina)	Kadina	CMS Crows	Kadina	Ardrossan	Wallaroo Oval
2002	Kadina (CMS Crows)	Kadina	CMS Crows	CMS Crows	Southern Eagles	Yorketown Oval
2003	CMS Crows (Kadina)	Kadina	Kadina	Ardrossan	Central Yorke	Bute Oval
2004	Ardrossan (Kadina)	Kadina	Kadina	CMS Crows	Monnta	Ardrossan Oval
2005	Moonta (Paskeville)	Kadina	Central Yorke	Ardrossan	CMS Crows	Moonta Oval
2006	CMS Crows (Paskeville)	Moonta	CMS Crows	Kadina	CMS Crows	Paskeville Oval
2007	Central Yorke (Paskeville)	Central Yorke	Southern Eagles	Moonta	Moonta	Maitland Oval
2008	Southern Eagles (Moonta)	Southern Eagles	Ardrossan	CMS Crows	Moonta	Kadina Oval
2009	Southern Eagles 21.11 (137) (Moonta 7.8 (50))	Moonta	Kadina	Moonta	Southern Eagles	Minlaton Oval
2010	Kadina 12.11 (83) (Bute 7.8 (50))	Southern Eagles	CMS Crows	Kadina	Southern Eagles	Wallaroo Oval
2011	Kadina 13.9 (87) (Bute 9.13 (67))	Southern Eagles (Kadina)	Kadina (Moonta)	Southern Eagles (Kadina)	Southern Eagles	Yorketown Oval
2012	CMS Crows 23.9 (147) (Kadina 11.7 (73))	Paskeville (Kadina)	Southern Eagles (CMS Crows)	CMS Crows (Southern Eagles)	Bute/Paskeville	Bute Oval
2013	CMS Crows 23.5 (143) (Kadina 11.14 (80))	Kadina (Paskeville)	Southern Eagles (Central Yorke)	Southern Eagles (CMS Crows)	Moonta	Ardrossan Oval
2014	Paskeville 15.9 (99) (CMS Crows 10.12 (72))	Kadina (Paskeville)	Wallaroo (CMS Crows)	Bute/Paskeville (Southern Eagles)	Bute/Paskeville	Moonta Oval
2015	Paskeville 17.15 (117) (Kadina 10.8 (68))	Moonta (Central Yorke)	Bute/Paskeville (Moonta)	Moonta (CMS Crows)	Bute/Paskeville	Maitland Oval
2016	Moonta 14.15 (99) (Central Yorke 9.8 (62))	Kadina (Moonta)	Southern Eagles (Kadina)	Bute/Paskeville (CMS Crows)	Central Yorke	Paskeville Oval
2017	Kadina 11.8 (74) (CMS Crows 9.8 (62))	Moonta (Central Yorke)	Southern Eagles (Kadina)	Bute/Paskeville (Southern Eagles)	Central Yorke	Kadina Oval
2018	Moonta 15.12 (102) (Central Yorke 4.4 (28))	CMS Crows (Wallaroo)	Southern Eagles (Bute/Paskeville)	Bute/Paskeville (Southern Eagles)	Kadina	Minlaton Oval
2019	Southern Eagles 12.5 (77) (CMS Crows 7.7 (49))	Southern Eagles (Paskeville)	Kadina (Southern Eagles)	Central Yorke (CMS Crows)	Wallaroo	Wallaroo Oval
2020	COVID	COVID	Kadina (Southern Eagles)	Central Yorke (Kadina)	COVID	Maitland Oval
2021	CMS Crows 13.2 (80) (Moonta 11.13 (79))	CMS Crows (Southern Eagles)	Central Yorke (Southern Eagles)	Wallaroo (Central Yorke)	CMS Crows	Yorketown Oval
2022	Moonta 8.8 (56) (CMS Crows 3.4 (22))	Kadina (Southern Eagles)	Wallaroo (Central Yorke)	Wallaroo (Central Yorke)	CMS Crows	Bute Oval
2023	Kadina 15.4 (94) (Moonta 8.10 (58))	Southern Eagles (Moonta)	Wallaroo (Kadina)	Moonta (Paskeville)	Central Yorke	Ardrossan Oval
2024	Moonta 21.15 (141) (CMS Crows 6.4 (40))	Paskeville (Southern Eagles)	Wallaroo (Central Yorke)	Moonta (Southern Eagles)	Central Yorke (Wallaroo)	Moonta Oval
2025	CMS Crows 15.14 (104) (Moonta 10.5 (65))	Paskeville 7.7 (49) (Moonta 4.8 (32))	Wallaroo 8.5 (53) (Moonta 4.6 (30))	Wallaroo 6.7 (43) (CMS Crows 3.1 (19))	CMS Crows (Central Yorke)	Maitland Oval
2026						

== Yorke Peninsula Football Association ==
The Yorke Peninsula Football Association was formed in 1888 and was based in the Copper Coast area of the northern Yorke Peninsula.

The founding clubs were:

- Cross Roads
- Moonta
- Moonta Mines Turks
- East Moonta
- Wallaroo
- Wallaroo Mines (later Kadina).

The final year of the Yorke Peninsula Football Association was in 1960 when the competing clubs were:

- Kadina,
- Moonta,
- Paskeville
- Wallaroo

These clubs then joined the Yorke Valley Football Association in 1961.

=== Clubs ===
==== Final ====
Club	Colours	Nickname	Home Ground	Former League	Est.	Years in YPFA	YPFA Senior Premierships		Fate
Club	Colours	Nickname	Home Ground	Former League	Est.	Years in YPFA	Total	Years	Fate
Kadina (Wallaroo Mines 1888-1924)		Bloods, Bloodhounds	Kadina Oval, Kadina	–	1878	1888-1960	20	1908, 1909, 1910, 1911, 1912, 1921, 1922, 1926, 1928, 1929, 1930, 1931, 1933, 1934, 1940, 1946, 1948, 1955, 1958, 1959	Moved to Yorke Valley FA in 1961
Moonta		Demons	Moonta Football Oval, Moonta	MJFA	1895	1895-1913, 1937-1960	7	1901, 1904, 1937, 1938, 1947, 1949, 1960	Played in Moonta JFA between 1914-36. Moved to Yorke Valley FA in 1961
Paskeville		Magpies	Paskeville Oval, Paskeville	NWFA	1910	1927-1932, 1946-1960	3	1951, 1956, 1957	Moved to Yorke Valley FA in 1961
Wallaroo		Seagulls	Wallaroo Oval, Wallaroo	–	1888	1888-1960	21	1889, 1892, 1896, 1897, 1899, 1900, 1902, 1905, 1907, 1913, 1914, 1919, 1920, 1924, 1925, 1927, 1945, 1950, 1952, 1953, 1954	Moved to Yorke Valley FA in 1961

==== Former ====
Club	Colours	Nickname	Home Ground	Former League	Est.	Years in YPFA	YPFA Senior Premierships		Fate
Club	Colours	Nickname	Home Ground	Former League	Est.	Years in YPFA	Total	Years	Fate
Bute		Roosters	Billy Harris Memorial Oval, Bute	WAFA	1892	1930-1934	0	-	Returned to Western Areas FA in 1934
Cross Roads			Cross Roads Oval, Cross Roads	–	1888	1888-1892	2	1890, 1891	Recess between 1893-1913. Re-formed in Moonta JFA in 1914
Curramulka		Magpies	Curramulka Oval, Curramulka	YVFA	1888	1937-1938	0	-	Returned to Southern Yorke Peninsula FA in 1939
East Moonta	(1913-15) (1935)		Moonta Racecourse Oval, Moonta Mines	MJFA	1889	1889-1913, 1935	1	1935	Played in Moonta JFA between 1914-34, returned there in 1936.
East Moonta Federals			Moonta Racecourse Oval, Moonta Mines	–	1935	1935	0	-	Folded after 1935 season
Federal Rovers		Magpies	Lord's Ground, Wallaroo Mines	–	1907	1907-1927	1	1923	Moved to Kadina & Wallaroo JFA in 1928
Maitland		Lions	Maitland Oval, Maitland	YVFA	1880	1937-1940	0	-	Returned to Yorke Valley FA in 1946
Moonta Turks (Moonta Mines Turks 1888-1924)		Turks	Moonta Mines Showgrounds, Moonta Mines	–	1887	1888-1936	9	1888, 1893, 1894, 1898, 1903, 1906, 1909, 1915, 1932	Merged with Moonta in 1937
Natives			Kadina Oval, Kadina	–	1901	1901-1902	0	-	Folded after 1902 season
Port Victoria		Maroons	Port Victoria Oval, Port Victoria	YVFA	1910	1939-1940	1	1939	Returned to Yorke Valley FA in 1946
Port Wallaroo			Wallaroo Oval, Wallaroo	K&WJFA	1911	1935	0	-	Folded after 1935 season
Rainbows			Kadina Oval, Kadina	–	1895	1895, 1901	0	-	Recess between 1896-1900. Folded after 1901 season

=== Premierships ===
Year	A Grade	A Grade Runner Up	B Grade
1888	Moonta Mines Turks		
1889	Wallaroo		
1890	Cross Roads		
1891	Cross Roads		
1892	Wallaroo		
1893	Moonta Mines Turks		
1894	Moonta Mines Turks		
1895	Recess		
1896	Wallaroo		
1897	Wallaroo		
1898	Moonta Mines Turks		
1899	Wallaroo		
1900	Wallaroo		
1901	Moonta		
1902	Wallaroo		
1903	Moonta Mines Turks		
1904	Moonta		
1905	Wallaroo		
1906	Moonta Mines Turks		
1907	Wallaroo		
1908	Wallaroo Mines		
1909	Kadina + Moonta Mines Turks		
1910	Kadina		
1911	Kadina		
1912	Kadina		
1913	Wallaroo		
1914	Wallaroo		
1915	Moonta Mines Turks		
1916-1918 - competition in recess due to WWI
1919	Wallaroo		
1920	Wallaroo		
1921	Kadina		
1922	Kadina		
1923	Federal Rovers		
1924	Wallaroo		
1925	Wallaroo		
1926	Kadina		
1927	Wallaroo		
1928	Kadina		
1929	Kadina		
1930	Kadina		
1931	Kadina		
1932	Moonta Turks		
1933	Kadina		
1934	Kadina		
1935	East Moonta		
1936	Competition abandoned mid-season		
1937	Moonta		
1938	Moonta		
1939	Port Victoria		
1940	Kadina		
1941-1944 - competition in recess due to WWII
1945	Wallaroo		
1946	Kadina		
1947	Moonta		
1948	Kadina		
1949	Moonta		
1950	Wallaroo		
1951	Paskeville		
1952	Wallaroo		
1953	Wallaroo		
1954	Wallaroo		
1955	Kadina		
1956	Paskeville		
1957	Paskeville		
1958	Kadina		
1959	Kadina		
1960	Moonta		

== Southern Yorke Peninsula Football League ==
The Southern Yorke Peninsula Football League was formed in 1908 with 5 founding clubs, and after World War 2 the league remained largely structurally unchanged until it was absorbed in 1993.

In 1919 the Southern Yorke Peninsula Football Association and the Central Yorke Peninsula Football Association merged to form the Central And Southern Yorke Peninsula Association, which was re-named the Southern Yorke Peninsula FA a year later. The SYPFA went into recess during World War II but was re-formed in 1945. The Southern Yorke Peninsula Football Association was renamed as the Southern Yorke Peninsula Football League in 1957.

At the end of the 1993 season, after years of diminishing player numbers, the six remaining clubs were amalgamated into two new clubs – Curramulka, Minlaton and Stansbury as the CMS Crows, and Yorketown, Edithburgh and Western United as the Southern Eagles – and the two resulting clubs joined the YVFL for the 1994 season.

=== Clubs ===
==== Final ====
Club	Jumper	Nickname	Home Ground	Former League	Est.	Years in SYPFA	Senior Premierships		Fate
Club	Jumper	Nickname	Home Ground	Former League	Est.	Years in SYPFA	Total	Years	Fate
Curramulka		Magpies	Curramulka Oval, Curramulka	CYPFA, YPFA	1888	1922, 1939–1993	17	1950, 1952, 1954, 1957, 1958, 1959, 1960, 1962, 1963, 1964, 1976, 1977, 1978, 1980, 1982, 1983, 1987	Moved to Northern Yorke Peninsula FA in 1923. Merged with Minlaton and Stansbury to form CMS Crows following 1993 season
Edithburgh		Peckers	Edithburgh Oval, Edithburgh	–	1886	1908–1938, 1946–1993	16	1908, 1910, 1912, 1913, 1914, 1945, 1955, 1956, 1968, 1969, 1970, 1971, 1972, 1989, 1991, 1993	Recess from 1939-45. Merged with Western United and Yorketown to form Southern Eagles following 1994 season
Minlaton		Bulldogs	Minlaton Oval, Minlaton	CYPFA, YVFA	1903	1915, 1922, 1933–1993	12	1922, 1933, 1939, 1947, 1948, 1965, 1966, 1967, 1973, 1974, 1975, 1979	Returned to Central Yorke Peninsula FA in 1919. Moved to Northern Yorke Peninsula FA in 1923. Merged with Curramulka and Stansbury to form CMS Crows following 1993 season
Stansbury (Stansbury-Stenhouse Bay 1963-67)		Kangaroos	Stansbury Oval, Stansbury	CYPFA	1903	1908–1910, 1922–1926, 1928–1993	8	1936, 1937, 1938, 1940, 1951 1953, 1984, 1988	Recess in 1927. Moved to Central Yorke Peninsula FA in 1911. Merged with Curramulka and Minlaton to form CMS Crows following 1993 season
Western United		Roosters	Warooka Oval, Warooka	–	1925	1926–1993	7	1929, 1930, 1935, 1946, 1961, 1981, 1990	Merged with Curramulka and Yorketown to form Southern Eagles following 1994 season
Yorketown		Redlegs	Yorketown Oval, Yorketown	–	1900	1908–1993	11	1909, 1921, 1923, 1925, 1926, 1932, 1934, 1949, 1985, 1986, 1992	Merged with Curramulka and Western United to form Southern Eagles following 1994 season

==== Former ====
Club	Jumper	Nickname	Home Ground	Former League	Est.	Years in SYPFA	Senior Premierships		Fate
Club	Jumper	Nickname	Home Ground	Former League	Est.	Years in SYPFA	Total	Years	Fate
Brentwood		Magpies	Brentwood Oval, Brentwood	CYPFA	1901	1908, 1923–1956	5	1915, 1924, 1927, 1928, 1931	Formed Central Yorke Peninsula FA in 1909. Only fielded B-grade side after 1956, folded sometime after
Coobowie				–	1922	1922-1924	0	-	Folded after 1924 season
Honiton				–	1921	1921-1924	0	-	Folded after 1924 season
Port Vincent			Port Vincent Oval, Port Vincent	CYPFA	1905	1922-?	0	-	Folded at unknown date after 1954 season
Oaklands				–	1911	1911-1923	0	-	Folded after 1923 season
Sunbury			Sunbury Oval, Yorketown	–	1908	1908–1925	3	1911, 1919, 1920	Merged with Warooka to form Western United following 1925 season
Warooka			Warooka Oval, Warooka	–	1925	1923–1925	0	-	Merged with Sunbury to form Western United following 1925 season

=== Premierships ===
Year	A Grade	A Grade Runner Up	B Grade	Senior Colts	Junior Colts
1908	Edithburgh	Yorketown			
1909	Yorketown	Edithburgh			
1910	Edithburgh	Stansbury			
1911	Sunbury	Edithburgh			
1912	Edithburgh				
1913	Edithburgh				
1914	Edithburgh	Sunbury			
1915	Brentwood	Sunbury			
1916-1918 - competition in recess due to WWI
1919	Sunbury	Edithburgh			
1920	Sunbury	Edithburgh			
1921	Yorketown	Edithburgh			
1922	Minlaton	Yorketown			
1923	Yorketown	Stansbury			
1924	Brentwood	Stansbury			
1925	Yorketown	Brentwood			
1926	Yorketown	Edithburgh			
1927	Brentwood	Western United			
1928	Brentwood	Western United			
1929	Western United	Brentwood			
1930	Western United	Brentwood			
1931	Brentwood	Yorketown			
1932	Yorketown	Brentwood			
1933	Minlaton	Stansbury			
1934	Yorketown	Minlaton			
1935	Western United	Stansbury			
1936	Stansbury	Western United			
1937	Stansbury	Brentwood			
1938	Stansbury	Minlaton			
1939	Minlaton	Curramulka			
1940	Stansbury	Minlaton			
1941-1944 - competition in recess due to WWII
1945	Edithburgh	Western United			
1946	Western United	Curramulka			
1947	Minlaton	Curramulka			
1948	Minlaton	Western United			
1949	Yorketown	Minlaton			
1950	Stansbury	Western United	Western United		
1951	Stansbury	Curramulka	Curramulka		
1952	Curramulka	Western United	Port Vincent		
1953	Stansbury	Curramulka	Curramulka		
1954	Curramulka	Stansbury	Port Vincent		
1955	Edithburgh	Curramulka	Minlaton		
1956	Edithburgh	Yorketown	Minlaton		
1957	Curramulka	Edithburgh	Curramulka		
1958	Curramulka	Western United	Curramulka		
1959	Curramulka	Western United	Brentwood		
1960	Curramulka	Western United	Western United		
1961	Western United	Edithburgh	Western United		
1962	Curramulka	Edithburgh	Yorketown		
1963	Curramulka	Edithburgh	Western United		
1964	Curramulka	Yorketown	Western United		
1965	Minlaton	Western United	Minlaton	Minlaton	
1966	Minlaton	Curramulka	Minlaton	Minlaton	Stansbury
1967	Minlaton	Edithburgh	Western United	Curramulka	Minlaton
1968	Edithburgh	Western United	Curramulka	Minlaton	Minlaton
1969	Edithburgh	Stansbury	Minlaton	Minlaton	Minlaton
1970	Edithburgh	Minlaton	Western United	Yorketown	Minlaton
1971	Edithburgh	Minlaton	Western United	Minlaton	
1972	Edithburgh	Minlaton	Minlaton	Minlaton	
1973	Minlaton	Yorketown	Yoretown	Minlaton	
1974	Minlaton	Edithburgh	Minlaton	Minlaton	
1975	Minlaton	Edithburgh	Minlaton	Minlaton	
1976	Curramulka	Western United	Western United	Minlaton	
1977	Curramulka	Minlaton	Curramulka	Curramulka	
1978	Curramulka	Western United	Minlaton	Yorketown	
1979	Minlaton	Curramulka	Western United	Curramulka	
1980	Curramulka	Minlaton	Western United	Curramulka	
1981	Western United	Curramulka	Western United	Western United	
1982	Curramulka	Western United	Western United	Yorketown	
1983	Curramulka	Stansbury	Curramulka	Minlaton	
1984	Stansbury	Curramulka	Western United	Edithburgh	
1985	Yorketown	Curramulka	Minlaton	Yorketown	
1986	Yorketown	Western United	Minlaton	Yorketown	
1987	Curramulka	Yorketown	Yorketown	Yorketown	
1988	Stansbury	Edithburgh	Yorketown	Western United	
1989	Edithburgh	Minlaton	Western United	Curramulka	
1990	Western United	Edithburgh	Edithburgh	Stansbury	
1991	Edithburgh	Yorketown	Western United	Minlaton	
1992	Yorketown	Edithburgh	Edithburgh	Yorketown	
1993	Edithburgh	Yorketown	Minlaton	Stansbury	

== 2009 Ladder ==
Yorke Peninsula	Wins	Byes	Losses	Draws	For	Against	%	Pts	Final	Team	G	B	Pts	Team	G	B	Pts
Moonta	14	0	1	1	1657	1146	59.12%	29	Elimination	Bute	15	8	98	Kadina	9	9	63
CMS Crows	11	0	5	0	1615	1042	60.78%	22	Qualifying	Southern Eagles	13	18	96	CMS Crows	7	7	49
Southern Eagles	10	0	5	1	1581	1146	57.98%	21	1st Semi	Bute	10	15	75	CMS Crows	10	11	71
Bute	7	0	8	1	1201	1416	45.89%	15	2nd Semi	Southern Eagles	16	7	103	Moonta	11	17	83
Kadina	7	0	9	0	1313	1271	50.81%	14	Preliminary	Moonta	16	12	108	Bute	11	9	75
Wallaroo	6	0	10	0	1024	1265	44.74%	12	Grand	Southern Eagles	21	11	137	Moonta	7	8	50
Ardrossan	6	0	10	0	1159	1440	44.59%	12									
Central Yorke Cougars	5	0	10	1	1147	1569	42.23%	11									
Paskeville	4	0	12	0	972	1374	41.43%	8									

== 2010 Ladder ==
Yorke Peninsula	Wins	Byes	Losses	Draws	For	Against	%	Pts	Final	Team	G	B	Pts	Team	G	B	Pts
Kadina	13	0	3	0	1784	995	64.20%	26	Elimination	Southern Eagles	22	9	141	Wallaroo	11	12	78
Paskeville	13	0	3	0	1356	1161	53.87%	26	Qualifying	Paskeville	11	8	74	Bute	8	16	64
Bute	12	0	4	0	1748	1037	62.76%	24	1st Semi	Southern Eagles	22	9	141	Paskeville	11	12	78
Southern Eagles	12	0	4	0	1588	1073	59.68%	24	2nd Semi	Kadina	6	6	42	Paskeville	3	5	23
Wallaroo	9	0	7	0	1445	1216	54.30%	18	Preliminary	Bute	14	13	97	Paskeville	11	7	73
CMS Crows	5	0	11	0	1155	1586	42.14%	10	Grand	Kadina	12	11	83	Bute	7	8	50
Ardrossan	3	0	13	0	1170	1446	44.72%	6									
Moonta	3	0	13	0	995	1778	35.88%	6									
Central Yorke Cougars	2	0	14	0	771	1720	30.95%	4									

== 2011 Ladder ==
Yorke Peninsula	Wins	Byes	Losses	Draws	For	Against	%	Pts	Final	Team	G	B	Pts	Team	G	B	Pts
Kadina	15	0	1	0	1787	1017	63.73%	30	Elimination	CMS Crows	16	16	112	Paskerville	8	2	50
Bute	13	0	3	0	1694	1026	62.28%	26	Qualifying	Bute	17	16	118	Moonta	7	7	49
Moonta	12	0	4	0	1786	1046	63.06%	24	1st Semi	CMS Crows	16	11	107	Moonta	13	8	86
CMS Crows	12	0	4	0	1733	1095	61.28%	24	2nd Semi	Bute	17	10	112	Kadina	16	12	108
Paskeville	7	0	9	0	1356	1408	49.06%	14	Preliminary	Kadina	23	22	160	CMS Crows	9	5	59
Southern Eagles	6	0	10	0	1223	1331	47.89%	12	Grand	Kadina	13	9	87	Bute	9	13	67
Wallaroo	3	0	13	0	1165	1677	40.99%	6									
Ardrossan	3	0	13	0	984	1632	37.61%	6									
Central Yorke Cougars	1	0	15	0	741	2237	24.88%	2									

== 2012 Ladder ==
Yorke Peninsula	Wins	Byes	Losses	Draws	For	Against	%	Pts	Final	Team	G	B	Pts	Team	G	B	Pts
CMS Crows	15	0	1	0	2144	832	72.04%	30	Elimination	Moonta	15	12	102	Wallaroo	13	12	90
Kadina	13	0	3	0	1901	979	66.01%	26	Qualifying	Kadina	16	14	110	Paskerville	7	8	50
Paskeville	11	0	5	0	1424	1133	55.69%	22	1st Semi	Paskerville	20	14	134	Moonta	12	8	80
Moonta	10	0	6	0	1821	1426	56.08%	20	2nd Semi	CMS Crows	23	13	151	Kadina	8	6	54
Wallaroo	7	0	9	0	1242	1400	47.01%	14	Preliminary	Kadina	18	9	117	Paskerville	13	12	90
Bute	7	0	9	0	1239	1485	45.48%	14	Grand	CMS Crows	23	9	147	Kadina	11	7	73
Southern Eagles	5	0	11	0	988	1618	37.91%	10									
Central Yorke Cougars	3	0	13	0	1068	1846	36.65%	6									
Ardrossan	1	0	15	0	930	2038	31.33%	2									

== 2013 Ladder ==
Yorke Peninsula	Wins	Byes	Losses	Draws	For	Against	%	Pts	Final	Team	G	B	Pts	Team	G	B	Pts
CMS Crows	14	0	2	0	2127	1010	67.80%	28	Elimination	Kadina	21	18	144	Moonta	11	6	72
Paskeville	14	0	2	0	1877	903	67.52%	28	Qualifying	Wallaroo	19	16	130	Paskerville	17	15	117
Wallaroo	11	0	5	0	1551	1188	56.63%	22	1st Semi	Kadina	15	17	107	Paskerville	14	10	94
Kadina	11	0	5	0	1581	1281	55.24%	22	2nd Semi	CMS Crows	21	9	135	Wallaroo	10	13	73
Moonta	7	0	9	0	1389	1725	44.61%	14	Preliminary	Kadina	17	13	115	Wallaroo	17	7	109
Central Yorke Cougars	6	0	10	0	1098	1454	43.03%	12	Grand	CMS Crows	23	5	143	Kadina	11	14	80
Southern Eagles	4	0	12	0	924	1520	37.81%	8									
Ardrossan	3	0	13	0	1218	1965	38.27%	6									
Bute	2	0	14	0	1122	1841	37.87%	4									

== 2014 Ladder ==
Yorke Peninsula	Wins	Byes	Losses	Draws	For	Against	%	Pts	Final	Team	G	B	Pts	Team	G	B	Pts
CMS Crows	13	0	3	0	1802	850	67.95%	26	Elimination	Paskeville	12	11	83	Southern Eagles	5	4	34
Moonta	13	0	3	0	1910	1155	62.32%	26	Qualifying	Kadina	14	13	97	Moonta	13	11	89
Kadina	11	0	5	0	1528	1044	59.41%	22	1st Semi	Paskeville	11	12	78	Moonta	9	7	61
Paskeville	10	0	6	0	1596	1077	59.71%	20	2nd Semi	CMS Crows	14	13	97	Kadina	12	5	77
Southern Eagles	10	0	6	0	1279	1237	50.83%	20	Preliminary	Paskeville	10	8	68	Kadina	7	16	58
Wallaroo	6	0	10	0	1092	1396	43.89%	12	Grand	Paskeville	15	9	99	CMS Crows	10	12	72
Central Yorke Cougars	6	0	10	0	1254	1634	43.42%	12									
Bute	3	0	13	0	961	2063	31.78%	6									
Ardrossan	0	0	16	0	995	1961	33.66%	0									

== 2015 Ladder ==
Yorke Peninsula	Wins	Byes	Losses	Draws	For	Against	%	Pts	Final	Team	G	B	Pts	Team	G	B	Pts
Paskeville	14	0	2	0	1710	949	64.3%	28	Elimination	Ardrossan	12	16	88	Wallaroo	6	5	41
Moonta	14	0	2	0	1581	1039	60.34%	28	Qualifying	Kadina	15	11	101	Moonta	9	10	64
Kadina	13	0	3	0	1630	1039	61.07%	26	1st Semi	Moonta	12	13	85	Ardrossan	9	9	63
Ardrossan	10	0	6	0	1320	1095	54.66%	20	2nd Semi	Paskeville	9	13	67	Kadina	7	11	53
Wallaroo	7	0	9	0	1280	1192	51.78%	14	Preliminary	Kadina	15	12	102	Moonta	11	9	75
Central Yorke	6	0	10	0	1005	1175	46.1%	12	Grand	Paskeville	17	15	117	Kadina	10	8	68
Southern Eagles	5	0	11	0	986	1154	46.07%	10									
CMS Crows	2	0	14	0	820	1802	31.27%	4									
Bute	1	0	15	0	785	1672	31.95%	2									

== 2017 Ladder ==
Yorke Peninsula	Wins	Byes	Losses	Draws	For	Against	%	Pts	Final	Team	G	B	Pts	Team	G	B	Pts
Kadina	15	0	1	1	1286	928	138.58%	29	Elimination	Central Yorke	15	9	99	Southern Eagles	5	8	38
CMS Crows	13	0	3	0	1543	993	155.39%	26	Qualifying	CMS Crows	15	6	96	Moonta	13	10	88
Moonta	11	0	5	0	1676	1154	145.23%	22	1st Semi	Moonta	13	6	84	Central Yorke	11	5	71
Central Yorke	10	0	5	1	1444	890	162.25%	21	2nd Semi	Kadina	12	3	75	CMS Crows	8	4	52
Southern Eagles	9	0	7	0	1115	1039	107.31%	18	Preliminary	CMS Crows	13	7	85	Moonta	11	12	78
Wallaroo	7	0	9	0	1119	1253	89.31%	14	Grand	Kadina	11	8	74	CMS Crows	9	8	62
Paskeville	3	0	12	1	961	1359	70.71%	7									
Ardrossan	2	0	14	0	855	1681	50.86%	4									
Bute	1	0	14	1	879	1581	55.6%	3									

== 2016 Ladder ==
Yorke Peninsula	Wins	Byes	Losses	Draws	For	Against	%	Pts	Final	Team	G	B	Pts	Team	G	B	Pts
Moonta	15	0	1	0	1775	757	70.1%	30	Elimination	Kadina	11	10	76	Paskeville	7	7	49
Central Yorke	12	0	4	0	1322	790	62.59%	24	Qualifying	Central Yorke	10	16	76	CMS Crows	8	10	58
CMS Crows	12	0	4	0	1394	1034	57.41%	24	1st Semi	CMS Crows	15	7	97	Kadina	6	10	46
Kadina	11	0	5	0	1138	953	54.42%	22	2nd Semi	Moonta	8	6	54	Central Yorke	7	7	49
Paskeville	10	0	6	0	1268	890	58.75%	20	Preliminary	Central Yorke	18	13	121	CMS Crows	9	10	64
Southern Eagles	4	0	12	0	929	1392	40.02%	8	Grand	Moonta	14	15	99	Central Yorke	8	7	55
Wallaroo	4	0	12	0	859	1476	36.79%	8									
Ardrossan	2	0	14	0	792	1644	32.51%	4									
Bute	1	0	15	0	848	1389	37.9%	2									

== 2025 Ladder ==
Yorke Peninsula	Wins	Byes	Losses	Draws	For	Against	%	Pts		Final	Team	G	B	Pts	Team	G	B	Pts
Moonta	14	2	2	0	1669	703	70.36%	28	Elimination	Kadina	11	8	74	CY Cougars	16	6	102	
CMS Crows	13	2	3	0	1604	766	67.67%	26	Qualifying	CMS Crows	12	17	89	Bute	6	10	46	
Bute	11	2	4	1	1616	961	62.70%	23	1st Semi	Bute	19	14	128	CY Cougars	16	6	102	
Kadina	10	2	6	0	1319	1013	56.56%	20	2nd Semi	Moonta	10	10	70	CMS Crows	12	12	84	
CY Cougars	9	2	6	1	1313	1271	60.86%	19	Preliminary	Moonta	12	10	82	Bute	10	8	68	
Paskeville	6	2	10	0	1151	1175	49.48%	12	Grand	CMS Crows	15	14	104	Moonta	10	5	65	
Southern Eagles	5	2	11	0	100	1491	42.45%	10										
Ardrossan	3	2	13	0	828	1735	32.30%	6										
Wallaroo	0	2	16	0	397	2415	14.11%	0										

== Books ==
- Encyclopedia of South Australian country football clubs compiled by Peter Lines. ISBN 9780980447293
- South Australian country football digest by Peter Lines ISBN 9780987159199
