= List of county municipality subdivisions in Nova Scotia =

The Canadian province of Nova Scotia is divided into 18 historical counties that were established between 1759 and 1851. These historical counties are now predominantly governed by 4 regional municipalities, 11 district municipalities and 9 county municipalities. The 9 county municipalities are divided into 28 county municipality subdivisions for Canadian census statistical purposes.

The most populous county municipality subdivision in Nova Scotia is Kings Subdivision A at 22,355, which resides in the Municipality of the County of Kings. The least populous county municipality subdivision is Richmond Subdivision B at 1,610, which is within the Municipality of the County of Richmond.

The largest and smallest county municipality subdivisions by land area are Inverness Subdivision A of the Municipality of the County of Inverness at 2,017.79 km^{2} (779.07 sq mi) and Richmond Subdivision C of the Municipality of the County of Richmond at 129.32 km^{2} (49.93 sq mi) respectively.

== List ==
List of county municipality subdivisions in Nova Scotia
Name	County municipality	2021 Census of Population				
Name	County municipality	Population (2021)	Population (2016)	Change	Land area (km^{2})	Population density
Annapolis Subdivision A	Annapolis	5,980	5,866	+1.9%	612.44	9.8/km^{2}
Annapolis Subdivision B	Annapolis	4,587	4,448	+3.1%	377.16	12.2/km^{2}
Annapolis Subdivision C	Annapolis	5,218	4,947	+5.5%	206.51	25.3/km^{2}
Annapolis Subdivision D	Annapolis	3,049	2,991	+1.9%	1,976.25	1.5/km^{2}
Antigonish Subdivision A	Antigonish	8,963	8,278	+8.3%	926.43	9.7/km^{2}
Antigonish Subdivision B	Antigonish	6,138	6,306	−2.7%	522.29	11.8/km^{2}
Colchester Subdivision A	Colchester	3,762	3,459	+8.8%	877.35	4.3/km^{2}
Colchester Subdivision B	Colchester	19,806	19,534	+1.4%	1,248.24	15.9/km^{2}
Colchester Subdivision C	Colchester	12,476	13,098	−4.7%	1,443.12	8.6/km^{2}
Cumberland Subdivision A	Cumberland	3,201	3,120	+2.6%	1,135.55	2.8/km^{2}
Cumberland Subdivision B	Cumberland	6,786	6,859	−1.1%	1,168.37	5.8/km^{2}
Cumberland Subdivision C	Cumberland	5,694	5,268	+8.1%	896.22	6.4/km^{2}
Cumberland Subdivision D	Cumberland	4,283	4,155	+3.1%	1,052.9	4.1/km^{2}
Inverness Subdivision A	Inverness	5,207	5,076	+2.6%	2,017.79	2.6/km^{2}
Inverness Subdivision B	Inverness	4,865	4,928	−1.3%	751.9	6.5/km^{2}
Inverness Subdivision C	Inverness	3,167	3,166	0.0%	1,025.65	3.1/km^{2}
Kings Subdivision A	Kings	22,355	22,234	+0.5%	1,233.05	18.1/km^{2}
Kings Subdivision B	Kings	11,951	11,858	+0.8%	346.02	34.5/km^{2}
Kings Subdivision C	Kings	8,348	8,093	+3.2%	243.95	34.2/km^{2}
Kings Subdivision D	Kings	5,264	5,219	+0.9%	264.86	19.9/km^{2}
Pictou Subdivision A	Pictou	6,153	6,075	+1.3%	769.64	8.0/km^{2}
Pictou Subdivision B	Pictou	6,137	6,174	−0.6%	770.57	8.0/km^{2}
Pictou Subdivision C	Pictou	8,386	8,443	−0.7%	1,254.87	6.7/km^{2}
Richmond Subdivision A	Richmond	3,763	3,796	−0.9%	464.88	8.1/km^{2}
Richmond Subdivision B	Richmond	1,610	1,512	+6.5%	646.26	2.5/km^{2}
Richmond Subdivision C	Richmond	3,136	3,150	−0.4%	129.32	24.2/km^{2}
Victoria Subdivision A	Victoria	2,673	2,567	+4.1%	1,603.85	1.7/km^{2}
Victoria Subdivision B	Victoria	4,077	3,985	+2.3%	1,228.63	3.3/km^{2}

== See also ==
- List of counties of Nova Scotia
- List of municipalities in Nova Scotia
