= Black Point =

Black Point may refer to:

== Places ==
=== Antarctica ===
- Black Point (Antarctica), a place in Antarctica

=== Australia ===
- Black Point (South Australia), a headland on the Yorke Peninsula
  - Black Point, South Australia, locality
- Black Point (Western Australia), the coastal western boundary of the D'Entrecasteaux National Park

=== Bahamas ===
- Black Point (Bahamas), a district of Bahamas

=== Canada ===
- Black Point, Cape Breton Island, Victoria County, Nova Scotia
- Black Point, Halifax, Nova Scotia, a community in the Halifax Regional Municipality
- Black Point, Pictou County, Nova Scotia, a community in Pictou County
- Black Point, Saskatchewan, a community in northern Saskatchewan

=== Hong Kong ===
- Black Point, Hong Kong - located in Lung Kwu Tan and home to Black Point Power Station

=== United States ===
(by state then city)

- Black Point, California, the name of an unincorporated area near Novato
- Black Point (Sonoma County, California), a headland and surfing beach near Sea Ranch
- Black Point (San Francisco), a promontory and headland, now part of Fort Mason
- Honolulu Tudor–French Norman Cottages, a house at 4109 Black Point Road, Honolulu, Hawaii, listed on the National Register of Historic Places in Hawaii
- Black Point (Linn, Wisconsin), an estate listed on the National Register of Historic Places in Wisconsin

== Other uses ==
- Black point (disease), a fungal disease of grain
- Black Point (film), a 2001 movie
- Black Point (ship), a ship sunk by the U-853
- Black point compensation, a digital photography printing technique
- Black Point (artist), Dominican rapper
- Black Point, a pen name for manga author Takehiko Itō
- SHG Black Point, a video game console
