= South Lake (Antigonish) =

Lake in Antigonish County, Nova Scotia, Canada

South Lake, Antigonish
- Location within Nova Scotia
- Location: Antigonish County, Nova Scotia
- Coordinates: 45.765806°N 61.917298°W
- Basin countries: Canada

South Lake, Antigonish is a lake of Antigonish County, in the north of Nova Scotia, Canada. Its outflow is direct into the ocean waters separating the mainland from Cape Breton Island.

== See also ==
- List of lakes in Nova Scotia
