= Port Vincent =

Port Vincent may refer to:

- Port Vincent, Louisiana, a village in Livingston Parish, United States
- Port Vincent, South Australia, a small town on the east coast of Yorke Peninsula, Australia
