= Black Point, South Australia =

Black Point South Australia
- Coordinates: 34°36′49″S 137°53′24″E
- Population: 64 (SAL 2021)
- Established: 27 May 1999
- Postcode(s): 5571
- Time zone: ACST (UTC+9:30)
  - Summer (DST): ACST (UTC+10:30)
- Location: 72 km (45 mi) northwest of Adelaide
- LGA(s): Yorke Peninsula Council
- Region: Yorke and Mid North
- County: Fergusson
- State electorate(s): Narungga
- Federal division(s): Grey
Mean max temp	Mean min temp	Annual rainfall
21.9 °C; 71 °F	11.3 °C; 52 °F	504.0 mm 19.8 in
Suburbs around Black Point:
Pine Point	Gulf St Vincent	Gulf St Vincent
Pine Point	Black Point	Gulf St Vincent
Port Julia	Port Julia	Gulf St Vincent
- Footnotes: Location; Adjoining localities

Black Point is a locality in the Australian state of South Australia located on the east coast of Yorke Peninsula about 72 kilometres (45 miles) northwest of the state capital of Adelaide.

Black Point consists of an area of land bounded to the west by the St Vincent Highway and to the east by Gulf St Vincent where the coastline forms a bay gazetted as Port Alfred which faces to the north-east and concludes in the headland gazetted both as Black Point and the Narungga word, Gudliwardi.

Its boundaries were created in May 1999 for the “long established name” and includes the Black Point Shack Site. The name was derived from the headland on the coastline which was named by a Stephen Goldsworthy on 10 October 1854.

As of 2015, the majority land use within the locality is agriculture. A secondary land use is conservation which concerns the strip of land immediately adjoining the coastline. Tertiary uses include the use of land along the Port Alfred coastline for both residential use and short-term tourist accommodation with the latter being provided in the form of a caravan park.

Black Point is located within the federal division of Grey, the state electoral district of Narungga and the local government area of the Yorke Peninsula Council.

== See also ==
- Black Point (disambiguation)
- Black Point and Pine Point travel guide from Wikivoyage
