= Curramulka =

- Town
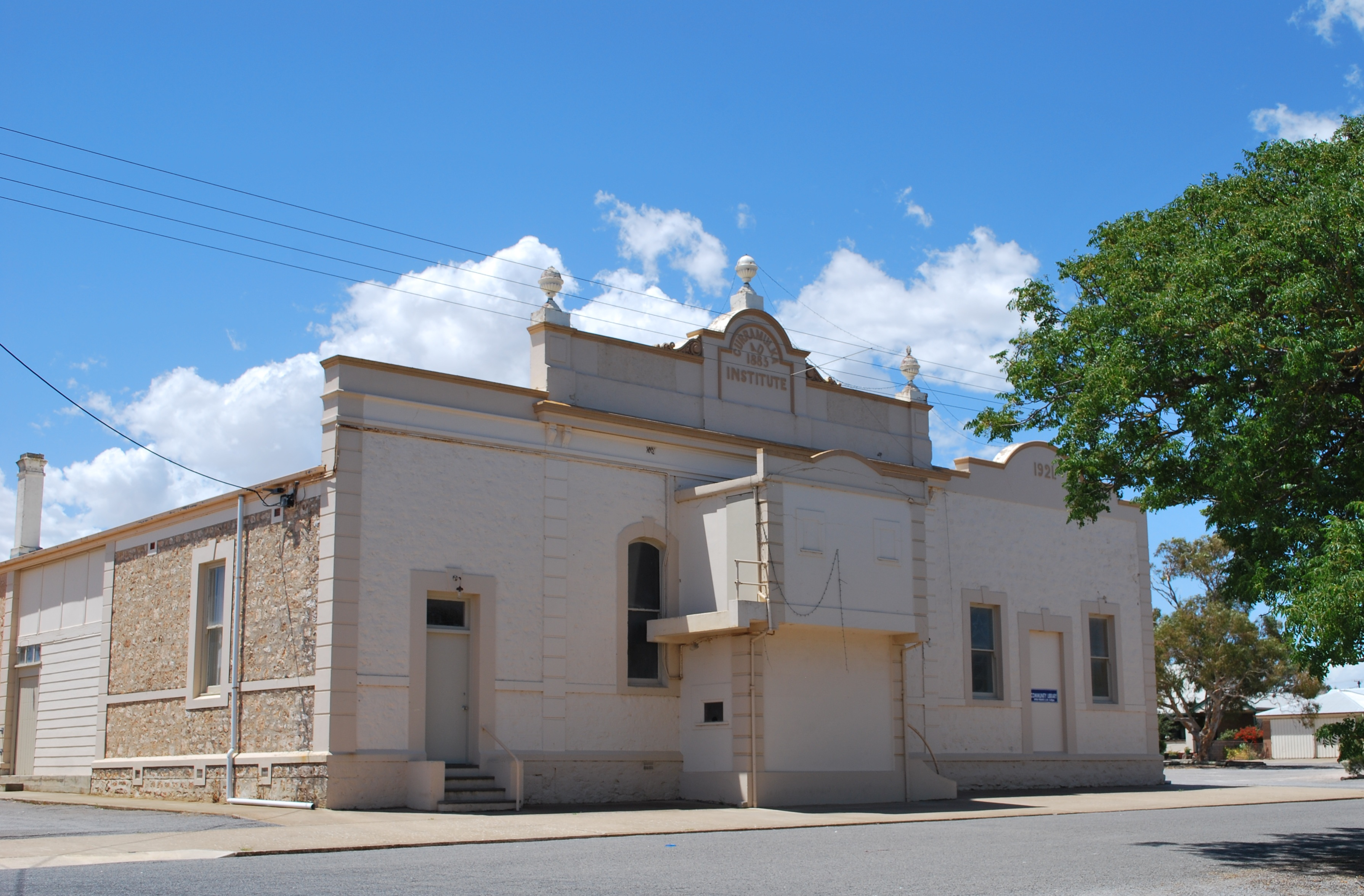
- Institute, built in 1885

- Coordinates: 34°41′46″S 137°42′39″E
- Country: Australia
- State: South Australia
- Region: Yorke and Mid North
- LGA: Yorke Peninsula Council
- Location: 185 km (115 mi) W of Adelaide; 94 km (58 mi) S of Kadina; 14 km (8.7 mi) NE of Minlaton
- Established: 12 September 1878 (town)

Government
  - State electorate: Narungga
  - Federal division: Grey

Population
  - Total: 304 (SAL 2021)
- Time zone: UTC+9:30 (ACST)
  - Summer (DST): UTC+10:30 (ACST)
- Postcode: 5580
- County: Fergusson
Localities around Curramulka
Wauraltee	Sandilands	Pine Point
Koolywurtie; Minlaton	Curramulka	Pine Point; Port Julia; Sheaoak Flat
Minlaton	Ramsay	Port Vincent

Curramulka, nicknamed "Curry", is a town in the Australian state of South Australia on the Yorke Peninsula. Curramulka is within easy driving distance of the coastal resort towns of Port Victoria and Port Vincent and is 15 kilometres (9.3 mi) north-east of Minlaton.

There are caves nearby.

== History ==
The Hundred of Curramulka was surveyed in 1874. The name is derived from the Aboriginal words curre (emu) and mulka (deep water hole), referring to the nearby caves.

Farming land was first opened up in the mid-1870s, and Curramulka flourished the late 19th and early 20th centuries. Port Julia was used to ship produce from the town.

The Curramulka Institute, a mechanics' institute, was built in 1885. Additions were built in 1906, 1922, and 1939, and in 1934 the building was transferred to the local council. It still stands for use by the community in 2020.

After the more northerly town of Ardrossan developed as the main regional port for wheat and wool, Curramulka's importance diminished, but it started to grow again in the 21st century.

On 19 November 2009 a large fire started in paddocks near Curramulka. The front was about 700 m (2,300 ft) long and burnt about 400 ha (990 acres).

== Caves ==
Nearby is an extensive chain of limestone caves. They were first explored in 1850, and major extensions discovered in 1984. They have 14 km (8.7 mi) of known passages in an area of approximately 400m x 300m and depth 46m. Corra-Lynn is the longest cave in the region.

== Football ==
Ngadjuri man Vince Copley became coach and captain of the Curramulka AFL team (in the now defunct Southern Yorke Peninsula Football League), reached the premiership in 1957, 1958, and 1959. It was his first experience of being welcomed into white people's homes, after experiencing racism in other country towns. In those days, the town was affectionately referred to as "the Currie".

== See also ==
- List of cities and towns in South Australia
