= Pine Point, South Australia =

Pine Point South Australia
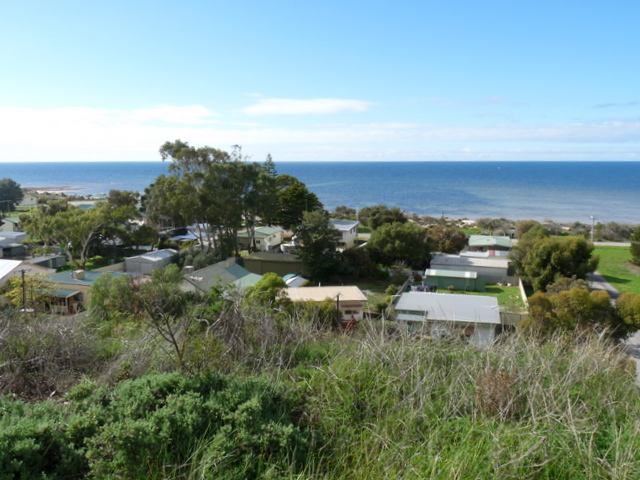
- Beachside shacks at Pine Point

- Coordinates: 34.5681°S 137.8822°E
- Population: 88 (SAL 2021)
- Established: 24 January 1874 (town); May 1999 (locality)
- Postcode(s): 5571
- LGA(s): Yorke Peninsula Council
- Region: Yorke and Mid North
- County: Fergusson
- State electorate(s): Narungga
- Federal division(s): Grey
Localities around Pine Point:
Sandilands	Sandilands	Gulf St Vincent
Sandilands; Curramulka	Pine Point	Gulf St Vincent; Black Point
Curramulka	Port Julia	Port Julia
- Footnotes: Adjoining localities

Pine Point (formerly Muloowurtie) is a locality in the Australian state of South Australia south of Ardrossan on the east side of Yorke Peninsula adjacent to Gulf St Vincent. It was surveyed as a government town in 1883 and proclaimed under the name of Muloowurtie on 24 January 1884. The name was changed to Pine Point in 1940. The boundaries of the locality were created in May 1999 in respect to the "long established name" and includes both "the Pine Point Shack Site" and " the Government Town of Pine Point."

== See also ==
- List of cities and towns in South Australia
- Pine Point (disambiguation)
