= Antigonish County =

Antigonish County Gaelic: Siorramachd Antaiginis
- County
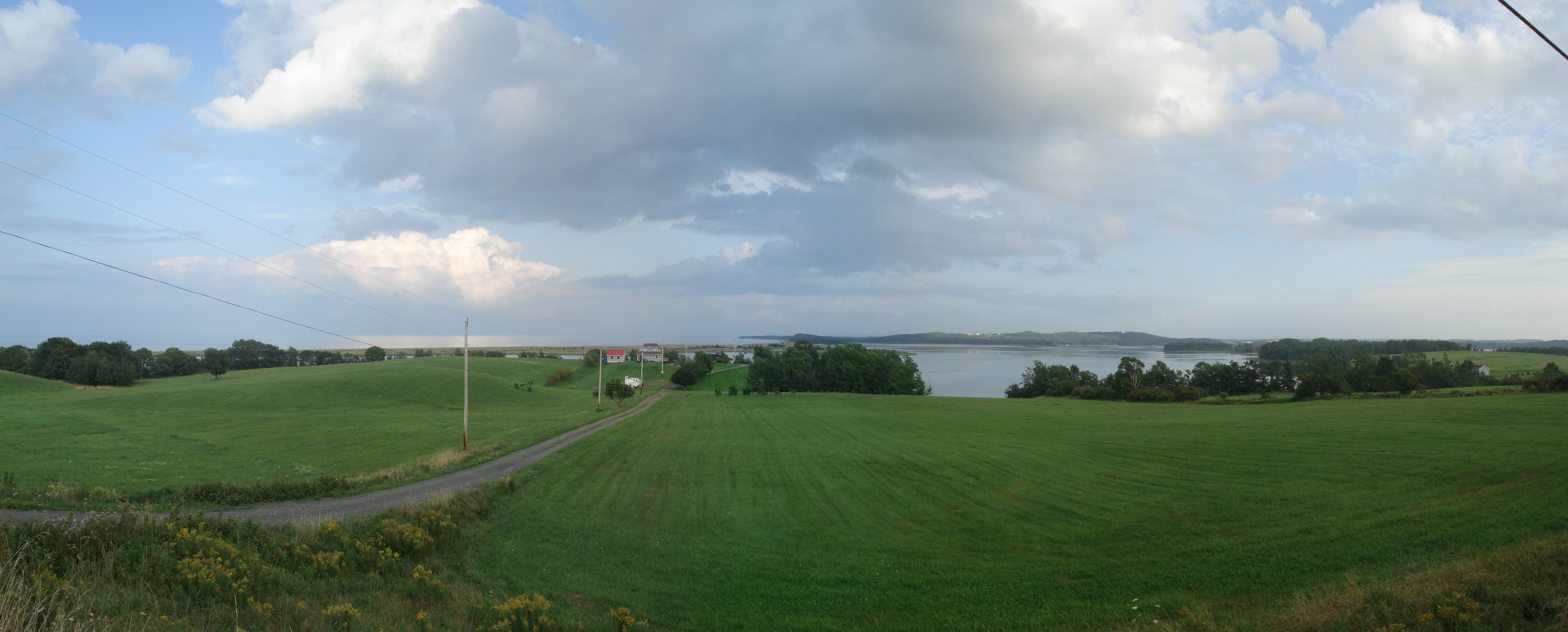

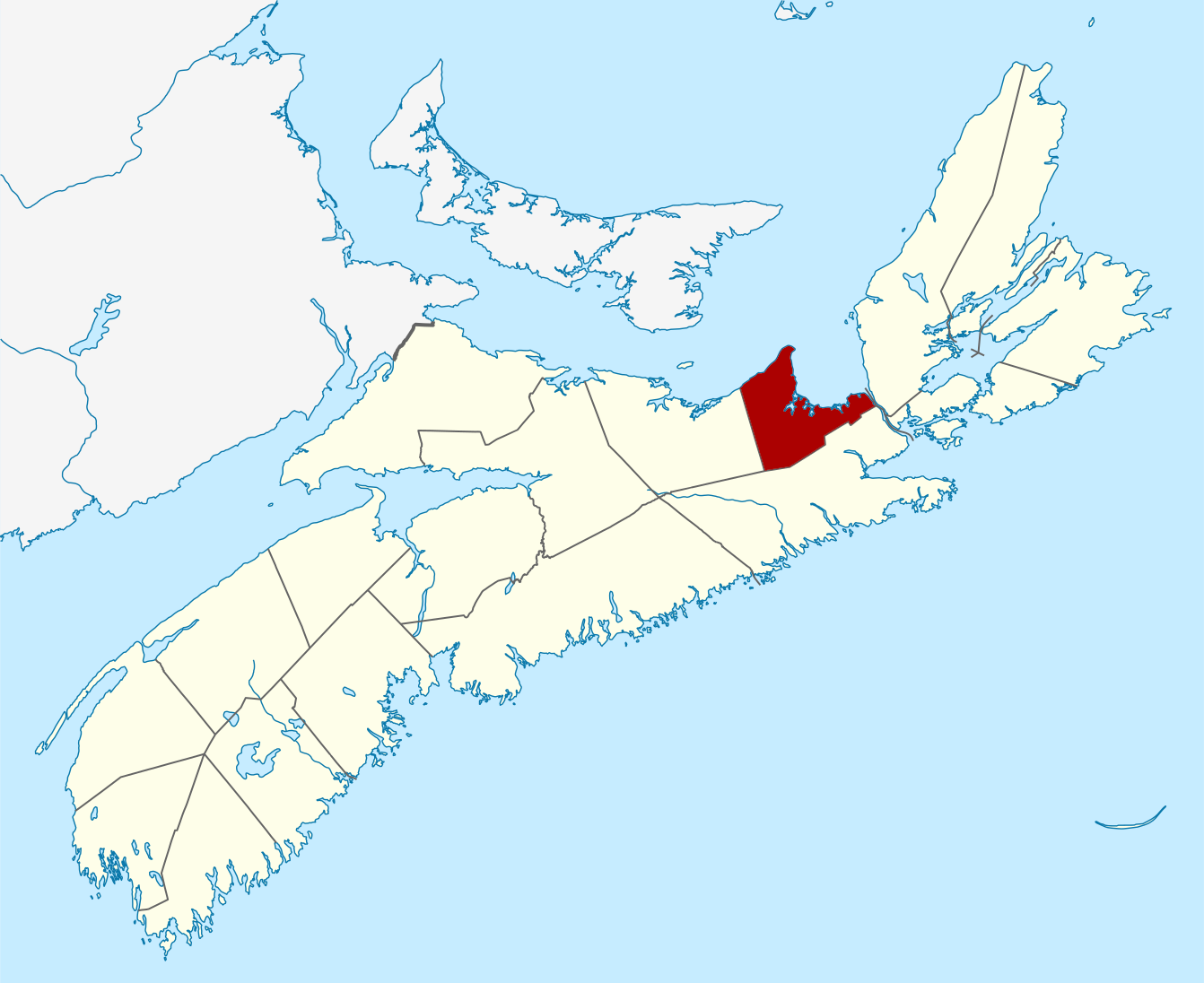
- Location of Antigonish County, Nova Scotia
- Coordinates: 45°36′N 61°54′W
- Country: Canada
- Province: Nova Scotia
- Municipality: Municipality of the County of Antigonish
- Established as Sydney County: 1785
- Renamed: 1863
- Incorporated: 1879
- Electoral Districts Federal: Cape Breton—Canso—Antigonish
- Provincial: Antigonish

Government
  - Type: Antigonish County Municipal Council
  - Warden: Owen McCarron
  - MLA: Michelle Thompson (PC)
  - MP (Cape Breton—Canso—Antigonish): Jaime Battiste (L)

Area
  - Land: 1,456.42 km^{2} (562.33 sq mi)

Population (2021)
  - Total: 20,129
  - Density: 13.8/km^{2} (36/sq mi)
  - Change 2011-16: ▲4.3%
- Time zone: UTC-4 (AST)
  - Summer (DST): UTC-3 (ADT)
- Area code: 902
- Dwellings: 9,842
- Median Earnings*: $49,581
- NTS Map: 011F12
- GNBC Code: CBUCC
- Median household income, 2005 (all households)

Antigonish County is a historical county and census division of Nova Scotia, Canada. Local government is provided by the Municipality of the County of Antigonish, the Town of Antigonish, and by two reserves: Pomquet and Afton 23, and Summerside 38.

== History ==
The County of Sydney was created in 1784.

When St. Mary's Township was established in 1818 it was partly in Sydney County and partly in Halifax County. In 1822 that part of St. Mary's Township which had been in Halifax County was annexed to the County of Sydney.

In 1836 Sydney County was diminished in size when Guysborough County was established out of what had been part of it. In 1863 the name of the County of Sydney was changed to Antigonish County. The word Antigonish is of Mi'kmaq origin, possibly derived from Nalegitkoonecht meaning "where branches are torn off". It is said that there were bears in the area that broke down branches to get beech nuts.

In 1879, the province officially incorporated the County of Antigonish as a municipality.

In 2001, the Town of Antigonish applied to annex 1,600 hectares from the surrounding county so it could expand. The Municipality responded that the annexation would hurt its tax base so it instead applied for a total merger, or amalgamation. The issue was sent to the Nova Scotia Utility and Review Board, and in 2005 it was decided that amalgamation of the Town and Municipality would better serve both parties. The board also ordered a plebiscite, promising to consider the results when making a final decision. The results were mixed, with 84% of Municipality residents voting yes to amalgamation and 74% of Town residents voting no. Voter turn-out was 45%. The board ultimately rejected the proposal for amalgamation, citing lack of public support.

The 2024 Boston Christmas Tree came from Mattie Settlement.

== Communities ==
Towns

- Antigonish

Reserves

- Pomquet and Afton 23
- Summerside 38

County municipality and subdivisions

- Municipality of the County of Antigonish
  - Antigonish Subdivision A
  - Antigonish Subdivision B

== Demographics ==
As a census division in the 2021 Census of Population conducted by Statistics Canada, Antigonish County had a population of 20,129 living in 8,711 of its 10,145 total private dwellings, a change of 4.3% from its 2016 population of 19,301. With a land area of 1,456.42 km^{2} (562.33 sq mi), it had a population density of 13.8/km^{2} (35.8/sq mi) in 2021.

Forming the majority of the Antigonish County census division, the Municipality of the County of Antigonish, including its Subdivisions A and B, had a population of 15,101 living in 6,371 of its 7,327 total private dwellings, a change of 3.5% from its 2016 population of 14,584. With a land area of 1,448.72 km^{2} (559.35 sq mi), it had a population density of 10.4/km^{2} (27.0/sq mi) in 2021.

Population trend

Census	Population	Change (%)
2021	20,129	▲4.3%
2016	19,301	▼1.5%
2011	19,589	▲4.0%
2006	18,836	▼3.8%
2001	19,578	▲0.1%
1996	19,554	▲1.7%
1991	19,226	▲2.4%
1986	18,776	▲3.7%
1981	18,110	N/A
1941	10,545	
1931	10,073	
1921	11,580	
1911	11,962	
1901	13,617	
1891	16,114	
1881	18,060	
1871	16,512	N/A

Mother tongue language (2011)

Language	Population	Pct (%)
English only	18,150	93.32%
French only	585	3.01%
Non-official languages	590	3.03%
Multiple responses	130	0.67%

Ethnic Groups (2006)

Ethnic Origin	Population	Pct (%)
Scottish	9,265	49.5%
Canadian	7,295	39.0%
Irish	5,515	29.5%
French	4,845	25.9%
English	4,275	22.8%
German	985	5.3%
Dutch (Netherlands)	970	5.2%
North American Indian	690	3.7%
Acadian	480	2.6%

== Major highways ==
Highways and numbered routes that run through the county, including external routes that start or finish at the county limits:

- Highways
  - Hwy 104 (TCH)
- Trunk Routes
  - Trunk 4
  - Trunk 7
  - Trunk 16
- Collector Routes:
  - Route 245
  - Route 316
  - Route 337
  - Route 344
- External Routes:
  - None

== Protected areas ==
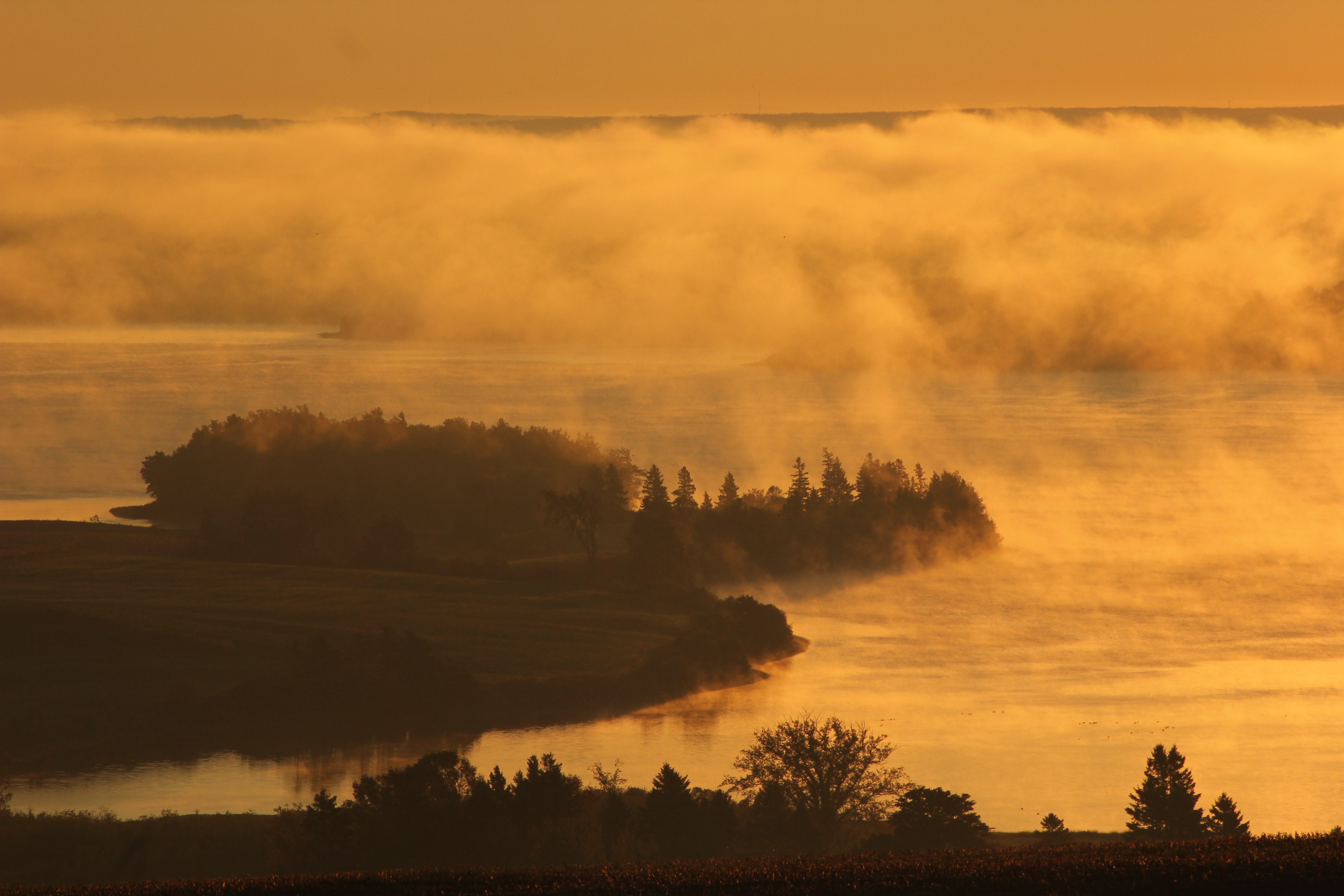
Antigonish Landing Wildlife Area

- Arisaig Provincial Park
- Antigonish Landing
- Bayfield Provincial Park
- Beaver Mountain Provincial Park
- Eigg Mountain-James River Wilderness Area
- Pomquet Beach Provincial Park

== Notable residents ==
- Donald Chisholm, stockcar driver
- Mary-Colin Chisholm, stage, film and TV actor
- Moses Coady, Roman Catholic priest, adult educator, and leader of the Antigonish Movement
- Sean Fraser (politician) (born 1984), politician and the current minister of justice and Attorney General of Canada
- Eric Gillis, long-distance runner and Olympian (2008, 2012, 2016)
- Max Haines, crime writer, columnist for the Toronto Sun
- Allan H. MacDonald, theoretical physicist
- Allan The Ridge MacDonald (1794–1868), local pioneer, and poet in Canadian Gaelic.
- Craig MacDonald, former professional hockey player
- Garfield MacDonald, Olympic Athlete
- John MacLean (d. 1848), local pioneer, poet and Seanchaidh. A highly important figure in both Scottish Gaelic literature and in that of Canadian Gaelic.
- Shauna MacDonald, actress, also known as "Promo Girl" on CBC Radio One
- Ryan MacGrath, musician and painter
- Al MacIsaac, Vice President Chicago Blackhawks
- Paul MacLean, assistant coach of the Toronto Maple Leafs
- Carole MacNeil, television journalist, former co-host of CBC News: Sunday and CBC News: Sunday Night
- Stephen McHattie, stage, film and TV actor
- Robyn Meagher, Olympic runner
- Carroll Morgan, Olympic heavyweight boxer
- Archbishop James Morrison, Catholic Bishop 1912
- Anne Simpson, poet
- Lewis John Stringer, Cross of Valour (Canada) Recipient, Wall of Valour
- The Trews, a rock band

== See also ==
- List of communities in Nova Scotia
- List of municipalities in Nova Scotia
