= Ainslie Glen, Nova Scotia =

Community in Nova Scotia, Canada

Coordinates: 46°1′0.31″N 61°8′27.51″W

Ainslie Glen in Nova Scotia

Ainslie Glen is a small community in the Canadian province of Nova Scotia, located in Inverness County on Cape Breton Island. In 2016, a tree on Crown Lands was chosen to become the Boston Christmas Tree.
