= Pine Point =

Pine Point may refer to:

Australia

- Pine Point, South Australia, a small township south of Ardrossan.

Canada

- Pine Point, Northwest Territories, a former mining town
  - Pine Point Mine
- Pine Point Park, a park in Toronto, Ontario

United States

- Pine Point, Minnesota, United States, a census-designated place
- Pine Point Township, Becker County, Minnesota
- Pine Point Research Natural Area in Minnesota
- Pine Point (California), a landform on Richardson Bay in Marin County, California
