= Sheaoak Flat, South Australia =

Sheaoak Flat South Australia
- Coordinates: 34.7035°S 137.876090°E
- Population: 28 (SAL 2021)
- Established: 1999
- Postcode(s): 5581
- Time zone: ACST (UTC+9:30)
  - Summer (DST): ACST (UTC+10:30)
- Location: 71 km (44 mi) north-west of Adelaide city centre
- LGA(s): Yorke Peninsula Council
- State electorate(s): Narungga
- Federal division(s): Grey
Mean max temp	Mean min temp	Annual rainfall
22.6 °C; 73 °F	10.9 °C; 52 °F	353.9 mm 13.9 in
Localities around Sheaoak Flat:
Curramulka	Port Julia	Gulf St Vincent
Curramulka	Sheaoak Flat	Gulf St Vincent
Port Vincent	Port Vincent	Gulf St Vincent
- Footnotes: Distances; Coordinates; Climate

Sheaoak Flat is a locality in South Australia located on the east coast of Yorke Peninsula immediately adjoining Gulf St Vincent about 71 kilometres (44 miles) north-west of the Adelaide city centre.

Its boundaries which were created in May 1999 included the “original shack site.” The “long established name” was retained but its spelling was changed from “Shea Oak Flat” to the “Sheaoak Flat.”

As of 2014, the locality was bounded by the St Vincent Highway to the west, by Micky Flat Road to the north, by Gulf St Vincent to the east and by a cadastral section boundary located midway between Sheoak Flat Road and Mulburra Park Road to the south.

As of 2014, the majority land use within Sheaoak Flat is “primary production.” The remainder of the locality's zones are located in a strip of load adjoining the coastline. The land associated with the area of low density residential and associated buildings (described as a “village environment” in local government documents) at the east end of Sheoak Flat Road is zoned as “settlement” while the land between it and the coastline is zoned as “coastal open space” which is reserved both for community use and as a buffer against sea level rise. A strip of land extending immediately north from the ‘village’ area to the locality's northern boundary is zoned as “rural living” where residential development is to be provided on “large allotments.” The remainder of the land adjoining the coastline is zoned from “coastal conservation” where “natural features” are to be retained and human activity is to have a minimal impact.

Sheaoak Flat is located within the federal division of Grey, the state electoral district of Narungga and the local government area of the Yorke Peninsula Council.

== See also ==
- List of cities and towns in South Australia
