= Port Julia, South Australia =

Port Julia South Australia
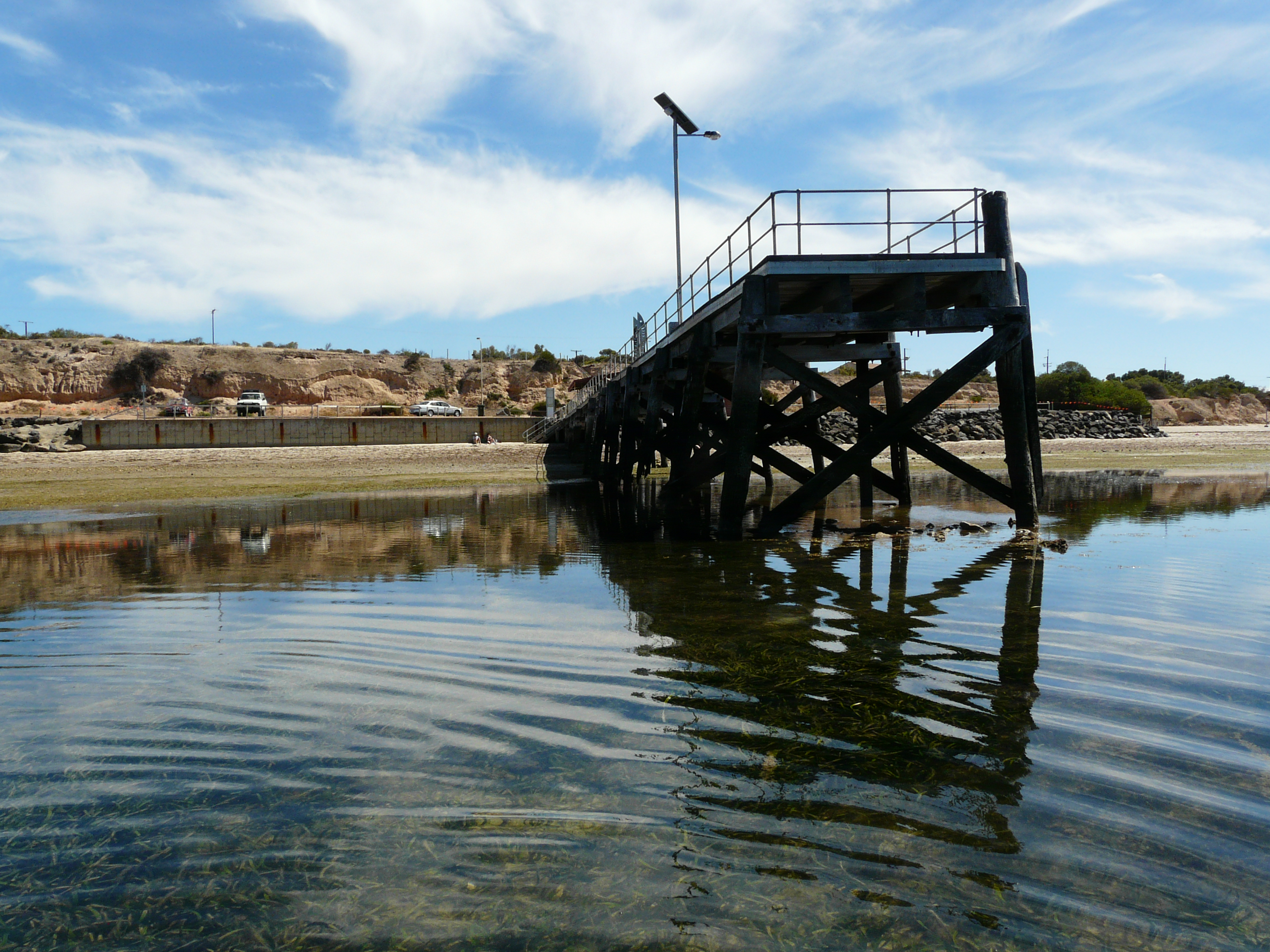
- Port Julia Jetty

- Coordinates: 34.6638°S 137.877990°E
- Population: 59 (SAL 2021)
- Established: 1999
- Postcode(s): 5575
- Time zone: ACST (UTC+9:30)
  - Summer (DST): ACST (UTC+10:30)
- Location: 72 km (45 mi) northwest of Adelaide city centre
- LGA(s): Yorke Peninsula Council
- State electorate(s): Narungga
- Federal division(s): Grey
Mean max temp	Mean min temp	Annual rainfall
22.6 °C; 73 °F	10.9 °C; 52 °F	353.9 mm 13.9 in
Suburbs around Port Julia:
Curramulka	Pine Point; Black Point	Gulf St Vincent
Curramulka	Port Julia	Gulf St Vincent
Curramulka	Sheaoak Flat	Gulf St Vincent
- Footnotes: Location; Coordinates; Climate; Localities

Port Julia (also known as Port Curramulka) is a locality in the Australian state of South Australia located on the east coast of Yorke Peninsula about 72 kilometres (45 miles) northwest of the Adelaide city centre.

Its boundaries were created in May 1999 for the “long established name” and includes both the former Port Julia Shack Site and the former Dipper Shack Site. The name is reported as being derived from a Mrs Julia Wurm (née Crush) whose husband and sons had acquired land in what is now the locality.

As of 2015, the majority land use within the locality is agriculture. A secondary land use is conservation which concerns the strip of land immediately adjoining the coastline. A third use of land along the coastline is for residential use at the sites of the former shack sites.

The locality contains the Port Julia Jetty and Cargo Shed, which is listed on the South Australian Heritage Register.

Port Julia is located within the federal division of Grey, the state electoral district of Narungga and the local government area of the Yorke Peninsula Council.
