= Black Point, Pictou County =

Community in Nova Scotia, Canada

Coordinates: 45.668°N 62.557°W

Black Point is a community in the Canadian province of Nova Scotia, located in Pictou County. In 2019, two residents donated the Boston Christmas Tree.
