= Municipality of the County of Antigonish =

County municipality in Nova Scotia

Antigonish County
- County Municipality
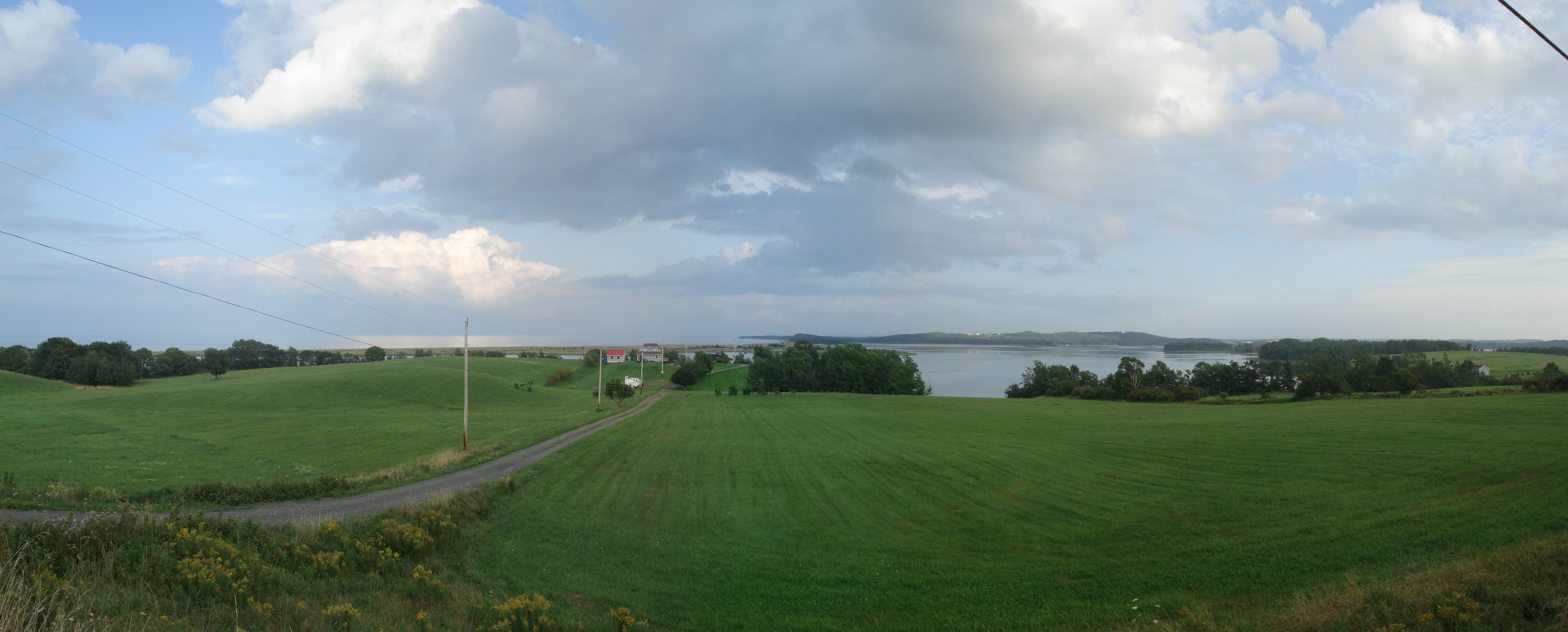

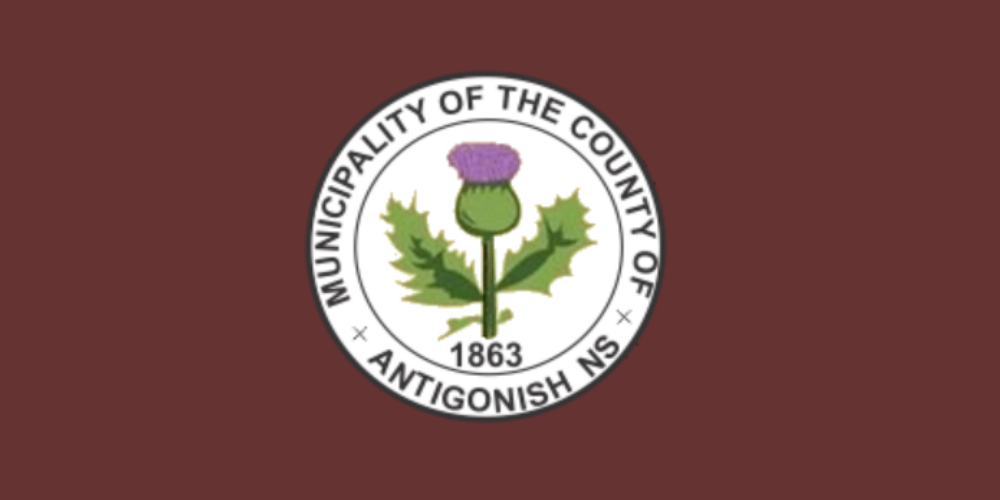
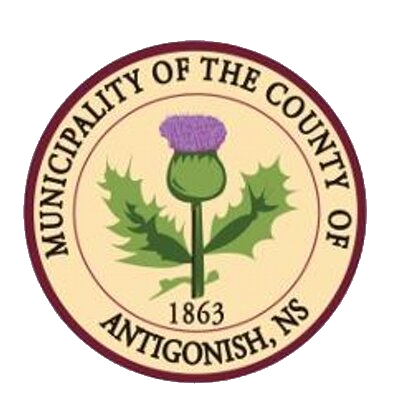
- Flag Seal

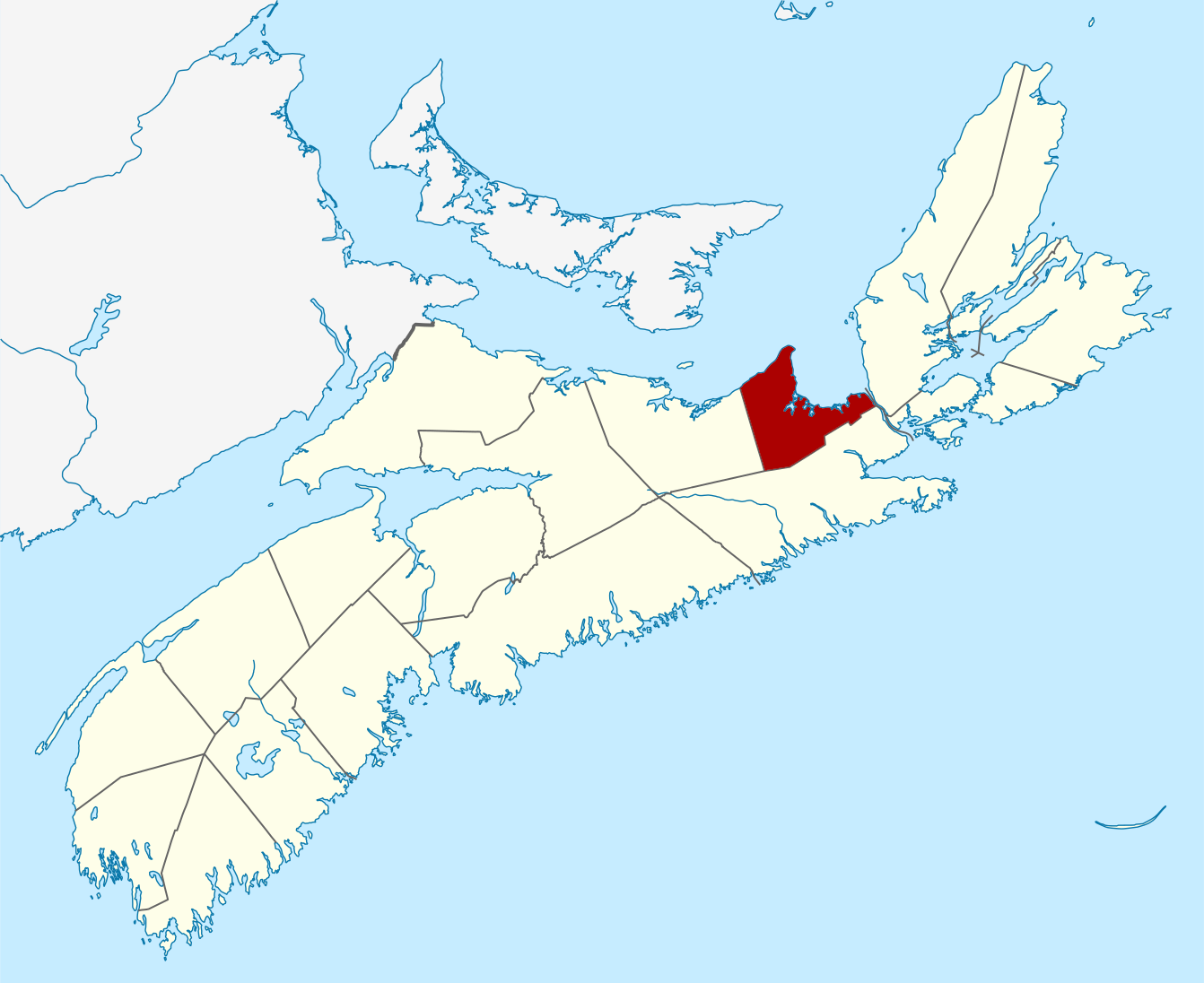
- Location of Antigonish County, Nova Scotia
- Coordinates: 45°36′N 61°54′W
- Country: Canada
- Province: Nova Scotia
- Municipalities: Municipality of the County of Antigonish
- Incorporated: 1879
- Electoral Districts Federal: Central Nova; Cape Breton—Canso
- Provincial: Antigonish

Government
  - Type: Antigonish County Municipal Council
  - Warden: Owen McCarron
  - MLA: Michelle Thompson (Conservative)
  - MP (Central Nova): Sean Fraser (L)
  - MP (Cape Breton—Canso): Mike Kelloway (L)

Area
  - Land: 1,457.81 km^{2} (562.86 sq mi)

Population (2016)
  - Total: 19,301
  - Density: 13.2/km^{2} (34/sq mi)
  - Change 2011-16: ▼1.5%
- Time zone: UTC-4 (AST)
  - Summer (DST): UTC-3 (ADT)
- Area code: 902
- Dwellings: 9,842
- Median Earnings*: $49,581
- NTS Map: 011F12
- GNBC Code: CBUCC
- Website: www.antigonishcounty.ns.ca
- Median household income, 2005 (all households)

The Municipality of the County of Antigonish is a county municipality in Nova Scotia, Canada. It provides local government to the eponymous historical county, except for the Town of Antigonish, and two reserves: Pomquet and Afton 23, and Summerside 38. In the Canada 2016 Census the county had a population of 19,301, a change of −1.5% from its 2011 population of 19,589.

The municipality provides public works services such as rubbish collection, road works, fresh water, and wastewater.

== History ==
Antigonish is from the Miꞌkmaq language and the meaning is uncertain. The first humans arrived in the area about 2500 years ago. Acadian colonists arrived in the early 1700s before being deported when the territory changed hands from the French Ancien Régime to the Kingdom of Great Britain. In the 1770s Scottish emigrants of the Highland Clearances arrived. Following the American Revolutionary War, United Empire Loyalists arrived. In second half of the 1800s, St. Francis Xavier University opened, and railways, telephones, electric lighting came to the area. At this point the population was close to what it is today.

It was incorporated as a county municipality in 1879 with the town of Antigonish incorporating as a separate municipality 10 years later.

== See also ==
- List of historic places in Antigonish County
