= Municipality of the County of Richmond =

- County municipality
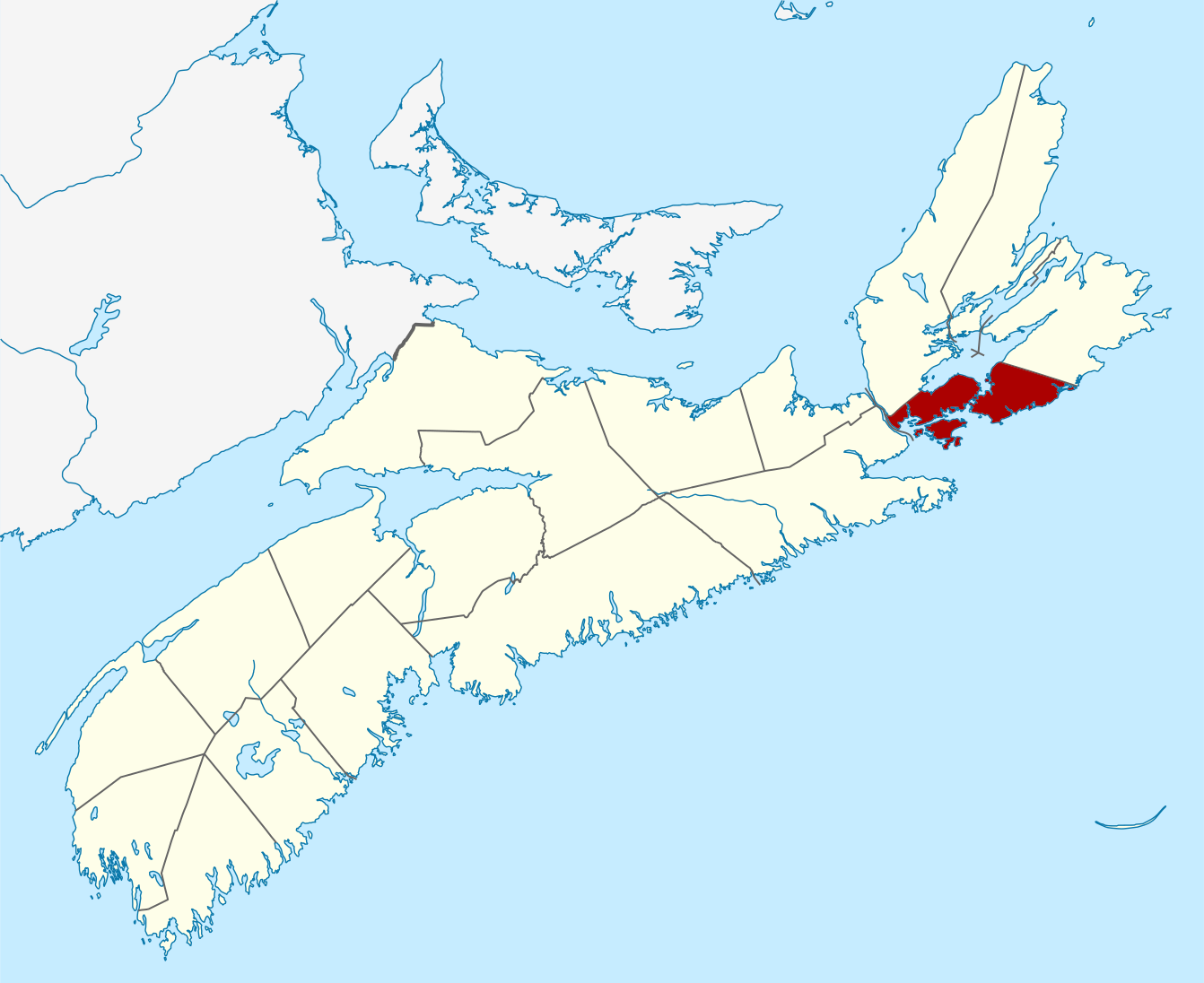
- Location of Richmond County, Nova Scotia
- Coordinates: 45.7°N 60.8°W
- Country: Canada
- Province: Nova Scotia
- Established: 1835
- Incorporated: 1879
- Electoral Districts Federal: Cape Breton—Canso
- Provincial: Cape Breton-Richmond

Government
  - Type: Richmond County Municipal Council
  - Warden: Jason MacLean

Area
  - Land: 1,249.33 km^{2} (482.37 sq mi)

Population (2016)
  - Total: 8,964
  - Density: 7.2/km^{2} (19/sq mi)
  - Change 2011-16: ▼3.5%
- Time zone: UTC-4 (AST)
  - Summer (DST): UTC-3 (ADT)
- Area code: 902
- Dwellings: 5,122
- Median Income*: $40,188 CDN
- Website: www.richmondcounty.ca
- Median household income, 2005 (all households)

The Municipality of the County of Richmond is a county municipality on Cape Breton Island, Nova Scotia, Canada. It provides local government to the eponymous historical county, except for the Chapel Island 5 reserve. The municipality also contains the village of St. Peter's. Municipal office are at Arichat. It is the site of St. Peters Canal.

It was named for a Governor General of British North America, Charles Lennox, 4th Duke of Richmond, and created in 1835, having formerly been part of Cape Breton County.

== Demographics ==
In the 2016 Census of Population Richmond County had a population of 8,964 in 5,122 private dwellings, a change of −3.5% from its 2011 population of 9,293. With a land area of 1,249.33 km^{2} (482.37 sq mi), it had a population density of 7.2/km^{2} (18.6/sq mi) in 2016.

== See also ==
- List of municipalities in Nova Scotia
