= Welnek No. 38 =

- Indian reserve
- Welnek No. 38 Welnek No. 38 (Canada)
- Coordinates: 45°36′30″N 61°46′20″W
- Country: Canada
- Province: Nova Scotia

Welnek No. 38 formerly Summerside 38 is a Miꞌkmaq reserve located in Antigonish County, Nova Scotia.

It is administratively part of the Paqꞌtnkek First Nation.
