= Pine Street Inn =

American nonprofit organization

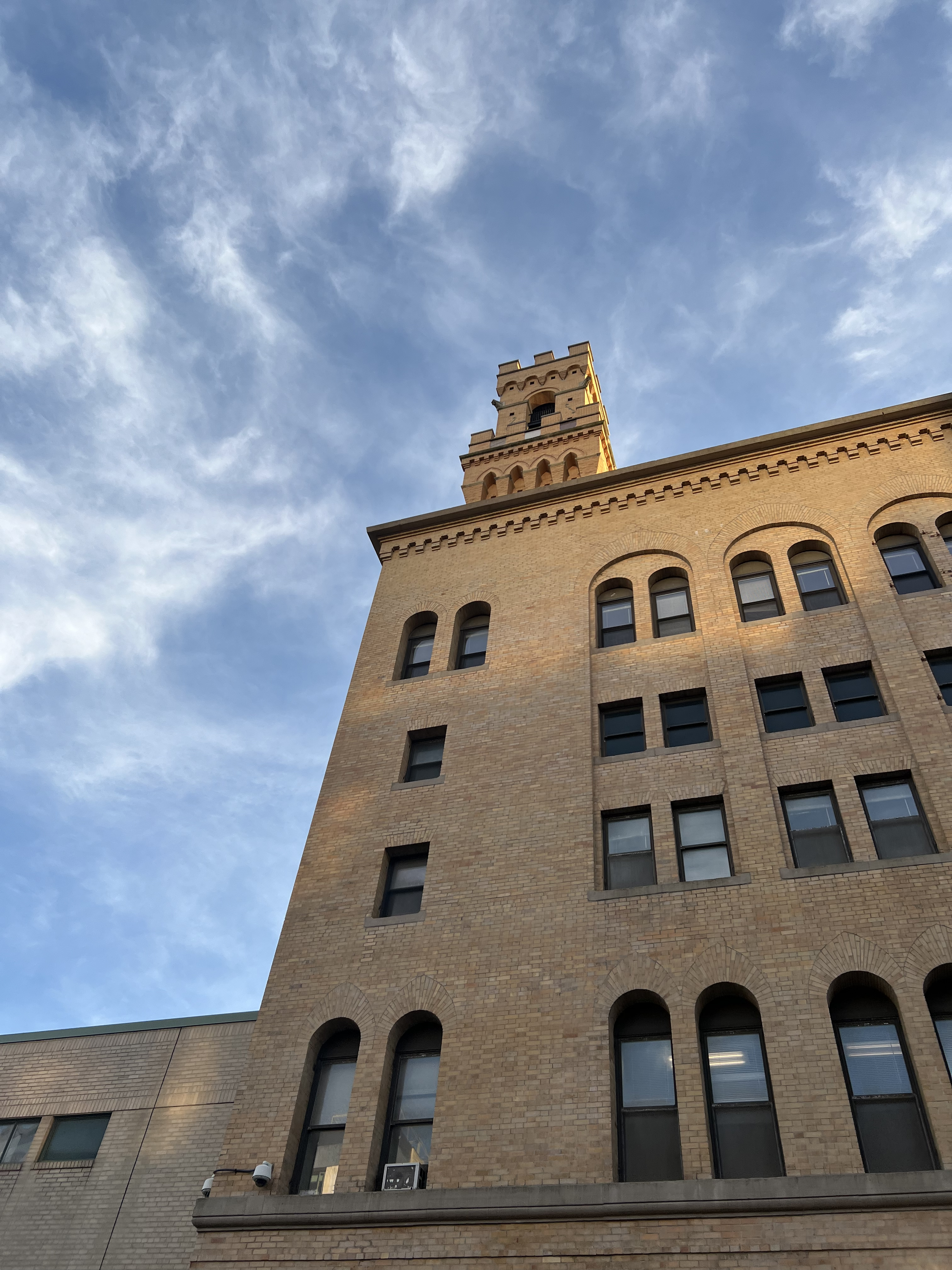
Exterior of Pine Street Inn's main shelter in Boston's South End

Pine Street Inn is a nonprofit organization that aims to end homelessness by moving individuals from the street into homes. Based in Boston, it was founded in Chinatown in 1969 and relocated to its current location in 1980.

Pine Street Inn is the largest provider of homeless services in the New England area, serving over 2,000 people per day across its emergency shelter, outreach, permanent supportive housing, and workforce development initiatives.

== History ==
In 1916, Charles G. Dawes opened the Rufus F. Dawes Hotel for Men at 8 Pine Street, Boston, as a low-cost option for housing 200 homeless men. It was named for his son Rufus, who had drowned four years earlier. The shelter was slated for demolition during the South Cove Urban Renewal Project in 1969, however, the Association of Boston Urban Priests took over the shelter instead. Paul Sullivan served as the shelter's first executive director from 1969 until his death in 1983.

Pine Street Inn was formally named after its original Chinatown address in 1973. In 1980, Pine Street Inn moved from 8 Pine Street to the Boston Fire Department's old headquarters in the South End, where the current location remains.

Pine Street Inn's street outreach team was founded in 1986 when a homeless man seeking shelter died in a storm approximately two blocks from the shelter.

Though shelter and outreach are prominent aspects of Pine Street Inn's service model, its ultimate goal is to end homelessness by moving individuals into homes. This goal led Pine Street Inn to focus on housing sites, the first of which was developed in 1984 in Brookline and housed 26 formerly homeless individuals. Pine Street continued expanding its services, and in 1993 began its food service training program. The method for moving individuals out of homelessness was to provide them with assistance in job training, job placement, and finding permanent housing.

The most recent addition to Pine Street's network of permanent supportive housing sites is The Lyndia, located at 3368 Washington Street. For this project, Pine Street Inn partnered with the Community Builders to transform an old administrative/warehouse building (belonging to the former). Completed in 2025, the development included 202 apartment units: 140 units going to Pine Street's housing program, and 62 units set aside as affordable housing for families.

Pine Street Inn's upcoming housing project involves another collaboration with the Community Builders, where the two organizations plan to redevelop a hotel in Dorchester into over 100 studio apartments.

== Services ==
=== Emergency shelters ===
Pine Street Inn operates four emergency shelters, three of which are open continuously year-round, the other of which is an overnight shelter only. Its men's and women's facilities are located in the South End of Boston.

The men's inn is the main shelter facility founded in 1969 and moved to the South End in 1980. Beside it stands the women's shelter, which was opened in 1980 in the building it currently occupies. The Women's Inn—or Yawkey House—provides shelter for approximately 120 women each night.

Pine Street Inn also operates two other shelters: Shattuck Shelter, a low barrier facility at the Lemuel Shattuck Hospital in Jamaica Plain and the Holy Family Inn, a sober, overnight facility.

=== Outreach ===
Aside from shelter, Pine Street also has an outreach team that provides services to those on the street where they are. From 5:00 am to 9:00 pm, they are available for daytime assistance, which can include providing supplies (e.g., water bottles, snacks, hygiene products, clothing) or assistance (i.e., with medical care, housing applications, benefits claims, information on staying at the shelter). From 9:00 pm to 5:00 am, teams in vans canvass the city, where they're able to inform people that they can stay at a shelter and they can provide warm meals, drinks, and other supplies (such as blankets and warm clothes) depending on the weather. Pine Street Inn also has a specific Veterans Outreach team, which provides the same support for homeless veterans.

=== Permanent supportive housing ===
Pine Street Inn develops and operates permanent supportive housing for individuals transitioning out of homelessness. These housing units are offered at subsidized rates to lower-income residents. Permanent supportive housing includes on-site staff and services to assist residents with maintaining stable housing. In March 2025, the completion of a new housing development brought Pine Street Inn's total to more than 1,100 units of housing for individuals moving out of homelessness.

=== Workforce development ===
Pine Street Inn's workforce development programs include job training initiatives for individuals experiencing homelessness. These programs train participants for careers in areas such as food preparation, building maintenance, and hospitality. Training includes both classroom instruction and hands-on work experience, including apprenticeships in areas such as food service and housekeeping. Participants also receive instruction in skills such as financial literacy and workplace readiness. The organization's food service training program began in 1993 and has continued to the present day.
