= Port Vincent, South Australia =

Port Vincent
- Town
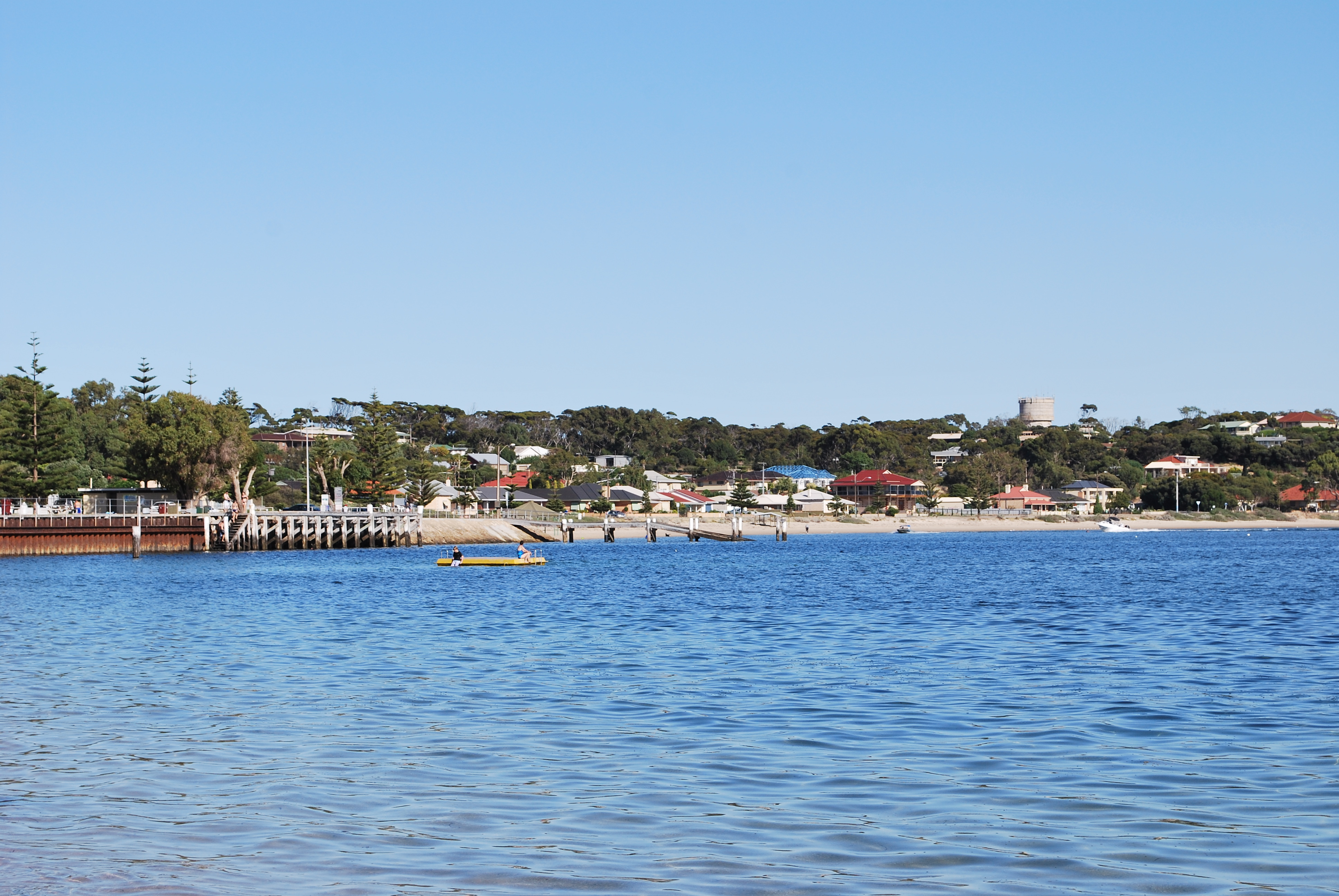
- Looking towards the beach at Port Vincent

- Coordinates: 34°46′0″S 137°51′0″E
- Country: Australia
- State: South Australia
- LGA: Yorke Peninsula Council
- Location: 194 km (121 mi) from Adelaide
- Established: 1877

Government
  - State electorate: Narungga
  - Federal division: Grey
- Elevation: 5 m (16 ft)

Population
  - Total: 494 (UCL 2021)
- Postcode: 5581
Localities around Port Vincent
Curramulka	Curramulka; Sheaoak Flat	Gulf St Vincent
Curramulka; Ramsay	Port Vincent	Gulf St Vincent
Stansbury	Stansbury	Gulf St Vincent

Port Vincent is a small town on the east coast of Yorke Peninsula in South Australia, 194 km from Adelaide by road.

== History ==
The Narungga people inhabited the area prior to white settlement. The town was laid out by Adelaide solicitor L.M. Cullen in 1877, originally known as Surveyor's Point.

In its early days it was a port exporting wheat, barley, wool and mallee stumps (firewood). From the first settlement in 1852 until 1877, coastal trading ketches would beach at high tide, and unload directly to farm wagons at low tide. A jetty was built into the bay in 1877, construction of a wharf began in 1901, and the original jetty was removed in 1918. Port Vincent was the main entry point for people and goods to and from the Yorke Peninsula until a good road was built from Port Wakefield in around 1949. Three major fuel companies had storage and distribution depots in the town, supplied by boat or barge from Port Adelaide.

== The town today ==
A seaside holiday destination for many years, it has recently been the site of a marina development. Port Vincent was named Australia's Tidiest Town in 2004, having won the South Australian award in 2000 and 2003. It has active volunteer organisations including the CFS, Coast Guard and Tidy Towns.

In 2003, a large marina was constructed in Port Vincent. It is operated by the Cruising Yacht Club of South Australia. Port Vincent can also cater for schools on camp with various water activities. The town has grown in size over the last few years with the release of land for housing. There is a proposed 'next stage', which will include over 100 domestic building blocks and possibly a retirement village.

2011 saw Port Vincent win the State's Cleanest Beach Award and went on to the National Judging.

VAC swim operates there in the summer holidays.

== See also ==
- List of cities and towns in South Australia
