= Canadian Gaelic =

Scottish Gaelic dialects of eastern Canada

- Cape Breton Gaelic; Gaelic
- A' Ghàidhlig Chanadach
- Pronunciation: [əˈɣaːlɪkʲ ˈxanət̪əx]
- Native to: Canada
- Region: Cape Breton Island, Nova Scotia; Prince Edward Island, Newfoundland
- Ethnicity: Scottish Canadians
- Speakers: L1: 1,545 in Canada (including 285 in Atlantic Canada) (2016) (Note: Canadian figures include all Scottish Gaelic speakers not just those derived from Atlantic Canadian dialects); L1 + L2: 3,980 in Canada (including 2,000 in Atlantic Canada) (2016)
- Language family: Indo-European: Celtic; Insular Celtic; Goidelic; Scottish Gaelic; Canadian Gaelic
- Early forms: Primitive Irish: Old Irish; Middle Irish; Scottish Gaelic
- Writing system: Latin (Scottish Gaelic orthography)

Language codes
- ISO 639-3: –
- Glottolog: None
- Linguasphere: 50-AAA-acp
- IETF: gd-CA
- Distribution throughout the Maritimes c. 1850

Canadian Gaelic or Cape Breton Gaelic (Scottish Gaelic: Gàidhlig Chanada, A' Ghàidhlig Chanadach or Gàidhlig Cheap Bhreatainn), often known in Canadian English simply as Gaelic, is the form of Scottish Gaelic spoken in Atlantic Canada.

Scottish Gaels were settled in Nova Scotia from 1773, with the arrival of the ship Hector and continuing until the 1850s. Gaelic has been spoken since then in Nova Scotia on Cape Breton Island and on the northeastern mainland of the province. Scottish Gaelic is a member of the Goidelic branch of the Celtic languages and the Canadian dialects have their origins in the Highlands and Islands of Scotland. The parent language developed out of Middle Irish and is closely related to modern Irish. The Canadian branch is a close cousin of the Irish language in Newfoundland. At its peak in the mid-19th century, there were as many as 200,000 speakers of Scottish Gaelic and Newfoundland Irish together, making it the third-most-spoken European language in Canada after English and French.

In Atlantic Canada today, there are approximately 2,000 speakers, mainly in Nova Scotia. In terms of the total number of speakers in the 2011 census, there were 7,195 total speakers of "Gaelic languages" in Canada, with 1,365 in Nova Scotia and Prince Edward Island where the responses mainly refer to Scottish Gaelic. The 2016 Canadian census also reported that 240 residents of Nova Scotia and 15 on Prince Edward Island considered Scottish Gaelic to be their "mother tongue". The 2021 Canadian census reported 2,170 Scottish Gaelic speakers in Canada (including 425 as an L1), 635 of them living in Nova Scotia (including 65 native speakers).

While there have been many distinctive Canadian dialects of Scottish Gaelic that have been spoken in other Gàidhealtachd communities, particularly in Glengarry County, Ontario and the Eastern Townships of Quebec, Atlantic Canada is the only area in North America where Scottish Gaelic continues to be spoken as a community language, especially in Cape Breton. Even there the use of the language is precarious and its survival is being fought for. Even so, the Canadian Gàidhealtachd communities have contributed many great figures to the history of Scottish Gaelic literature, including Ailean a' Ridse MacDhòmhnaill and John MacLean during the days of early settlement and Lewis MacKinnon, whose Canadian Gaelic poetry was awarded the Bardic Crown (Scottish Gaelic: Crùn na Bàrdachd) by An Comunn Gàidhealach at the 2011 Royal National Mòd at Stornoway, Isle of Lewis.

== Distribution ==
The Gaelic cultural identity community is a part of Nova Scotia's diverse peoples and communities. Thousands of Nova Scotians attend Gaelic-related activities and events annually including: language workshops and immersions, milling frolics, square dances, fiddle and piping sessions, concerts and festivals. Up until about the turn of the 20th century, Gaelic was widely spoken on eastern Prince Edward Island (PEI). In the 2011 Canadian Census, 10 individuals in PEI cited that their mother tongue was a Gaelic language, with over 90 claiming to speak a Gaelic language.

Gaels, and their language and culture, have influenced the heritage of Glengarry County and other regions in present-day Ontario, where many Highland Scots settled commencing in the 18th century, and to a much lesser extent the provinces of New Brunswick, Newfoundland and Labrador (especially the Codroy Valley), Manitoba and Alberta. Gaelic-speaking poets in communities across Canada have produced a large and significant branch of Scottish Gaelic literature comparable to that of Scotland itself.

== History ==
=== Arrival of earliest Gaels ===
In 1621, King James VI of Scotland allowed privateer William Alexander to establish the first Scottish colony overseas. The group of Highlanders – all of whom were Gaelic-speaking – were settled at what is presently known as Port Royal, on the western shore of Nova Scotia.

Within a year the colony had failed. Subsequent attempts to relaunch it were cancelled when in 1631 the Treaty of Saint-Germain-en-Laye returned Nova Scotia to French rule.

Almost a half-century later, in 1670, the Hudson's Bay Company was given exclusive trading rights to all North American lands draining into Hudson Bay – about 3.9 million km^{2} (1.5 million sq mi – an area larger than India). Many of the traders who came in the later 18th and 19th centuries were Gaelic speakers from the Scottish Highlands who brought their language to the interior.

Those who intermarried with the local First Nations people passed on their language, with the effect that by the mid-18th century there existed a sizeable population of Métis traders with Scottish and aboriginal ancestry, and command of spoken Gaelic.

=== Gaels in 18th- and 19th-century settlements ===
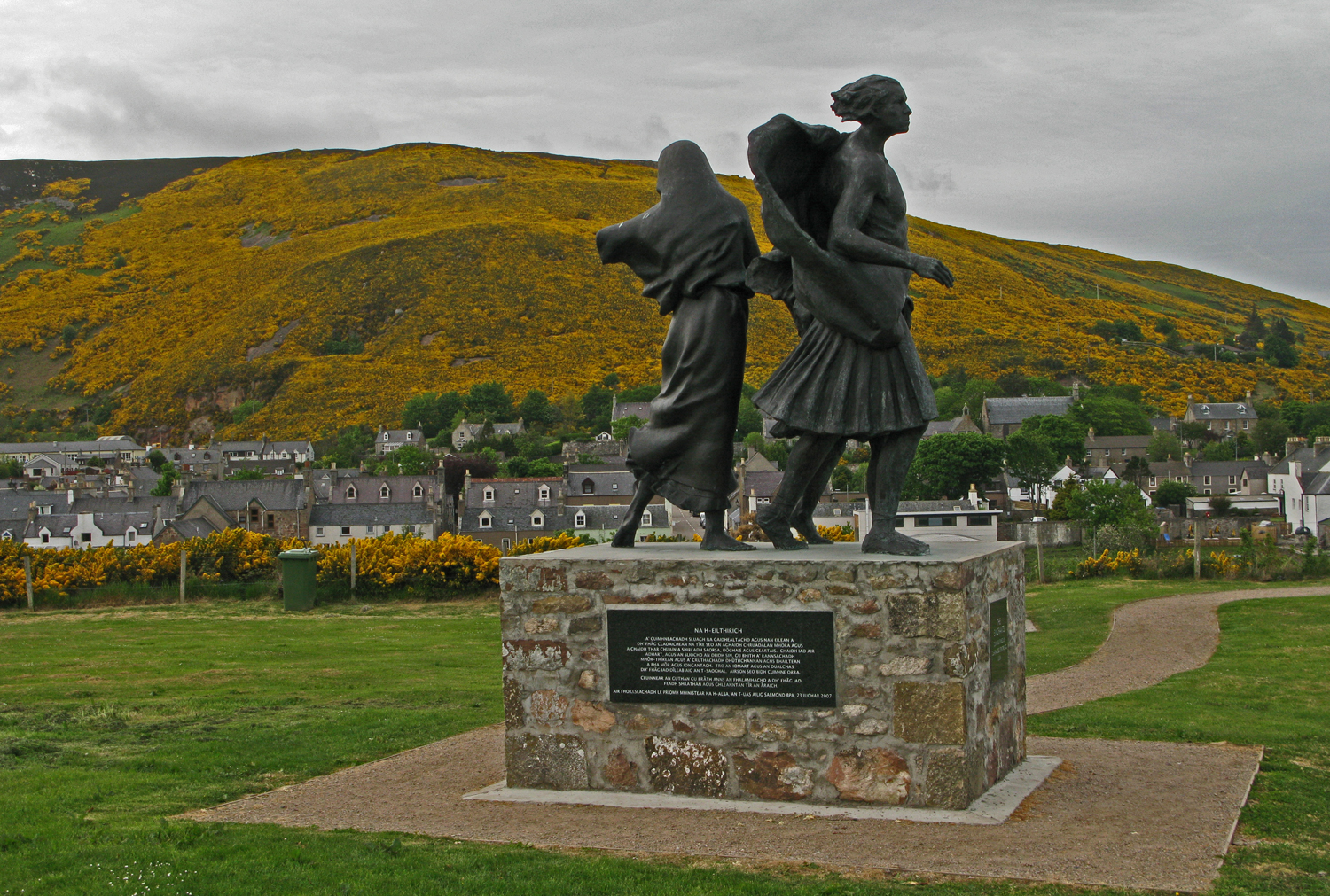
The Highland Emigrants' Monument at Helmsdale, Scotland

Cape Breton remained the property of France until 1758 (although mainland Nova Scotia had belonged to Britain since 1713) when Fortress Louisbourg fell to the British, followed by the rest of New France in the ensuing Battle at the Plaines d'Abraham. As a result of the conflict Highland regiments who fought for the British secured a reputation for tenacity and combat prowess. In turn the countryside itself secured a reputation among the Highlanders for its size, beauty, and wealth of natural resources. They would remember Canada when the earliest of the Highland Clearances by the increasingly Anglicized Scottish nobility began to evict Gaelic-speaking tenants en masse from their ancestral lands in order to replace them with private deer-stalking estates and herds of sheep.

The first ship loaded with Hebridean colonists arrived at Île-St.-Jean (Prince Edward Island) in 1770, with later ships following in 1772, and 1774. In September 1773 a ship named The Hector landed in Pictou, Nova Scotia, with 189 settlers who departed from Loch Broom. In 1784 the last barrier to Scottish settlement – a law restricting land-ownership on Cape Breton Island – was repealed, and soon both PEI and Nova Scotia were predominantly Gaelic-speaking. Between 1815 and 1870, it is estimated that more than 50,000 Gaelic settlers immigrated to Nova Scotia alone. Many of them left behind poetry and other works of Scottish Gaelic literature.

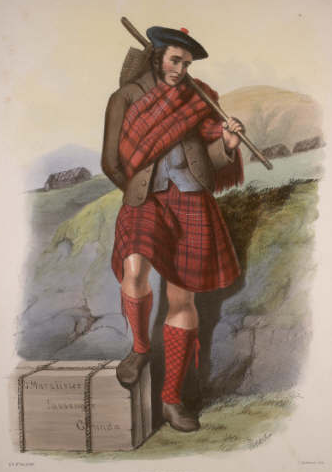
A romanticised early Victorian depiction of a member of Clan MacAlister leaving Scotland for Canada, by R. R. McIan

The poet Mìcheal Mór MacDhòmhnaill emigrated from South Uist to Cape Breton around 1775 and a poem describing his first winter there survives. Anna NicGillìosa emigrated from Morar to Glengarry County, Ontario, in 1786 and a Gaelic poem in praise of her new home also survives. Lord Selkirk's settler Calum Bàn MacMhannain, alias Malcolm Buchanan, left behind the song-poem Òran an Imrich ("The Song of Emigration"), which describes his 1803 voyage from the Isle of Skye to Belfast, Prince Edward Island and his impressions of his new home as Eilean an Àigh ("The Island of Prosperity"). Ailean a' Ridse MacDhòmhnaill (Allan The Ridge MacDonald) emigrated with his family from Ach nan Comhaichean, Glen Spean, Lochaber to Mabou, Nova Scotia in 1816 and composed many works of Gaelic poetry as a homesteader in Cape Breton and in Antigonish County. The most prolific emigre poet was John MacLean of Caolas, Tiree, the former Chief Bard to the 15th Chief of Clan MacLean of Coll, who emigrated with his family to Nova Scotia in 1819.

MacLean, whom Robert Dunbar once dubbed, "perhaps the most important of all the poets who emigrated during the main period of Gaelic overseas emigration", composed one of his most famous song-poems, Òran do dh' Aimearaga ("A Song to America"), which is also known as A Choille Ghruamach ("The Gloomy Forest"), after emigrating from Scotland to Canada. The poem has since been collected and recorded from seanchaithe in both Scotland and the New World.

According to Michael Newton, however, A' Choille Ghruamach, which is, "an expression of disappointment and regret", ended upon becoming, "so well established in the emigrant repertoire that it easily eclipses his later songs taking delight in the Gaelic communities in Nova Scotia and their prosperity."

In the Highlands and Islands, MacLean is commonly known as "The Poet to the Laird of Coll" (Bàrd Thighearna Chola) or as "John, son of Allan" (Iain mac Ailein). In Nova Scotia, he is known colloquially today as, "The Bard MacLean" (Am Bàrd MacGilleain) or as "The Barney's River Poet" (Bàrd Abhainn Bhàrnaidh), after MacLean's original family homestead in Pictou County, Nova Scotia.

With the end of the American War of Independence, immigrants newly arrived from Scotland were joined in Canada by so-called "United Empire Loyalist" refugees fleeing persecution and the seizure of their land claims by American Patriots. These settlers arrived on a mass scale at the arable lands of British North America, with large numbers settling in Glengarry County in present-day Ontario, and in the Eastern Townships of Quebec.

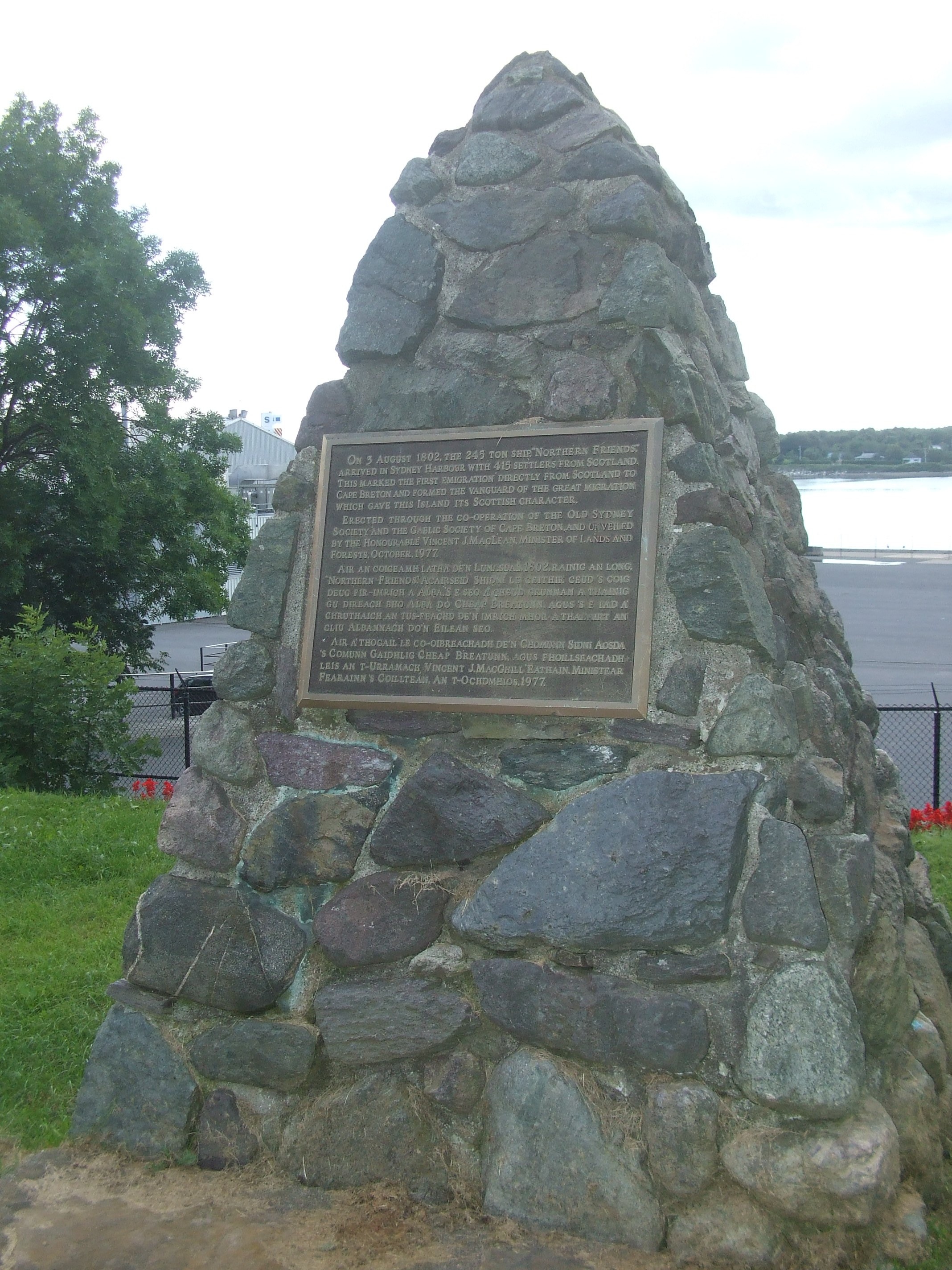
Memorial cairn to Scottish immigrants, Sydney, NS, with commemorative plaque in both English and Gaelic

Following an 1814 visit from Scotland to the settlement in Glengarry County, Ontario, Dr. D. MacPherson wrote, "You might travel over the whole of the County and by far the greater part of Stormont, without hearing anything spoken except the good Gaelic. Every family, even of the lowest order, has a landed property of 200 acres... However poor the family (but indeed there are none that can be called so) they kill a bullock for the winter consumption; the farm or estate supplies them with abundance of butter, cheese, etc., etc. Their houses are small but comfortable, having a ground floor and garret, with regular chimney and glass windows. The appearance of the people is at all times respectable, but I was delighted at seeing them at church on a Sunday; the men clothed in good English cloth, and many of the women wore the Highland plaid."

Unlike in the Gaelic-speaking settlements along the Cape Fear River in North Carolina, there was no Gaelic printing press in Canada. For this reason, in 1819, Rev. Seumas MacGriogar, the first Gaelic-speaking Presbyterian minister appointed to Nova Scotia, had to publish his collection of Christian poetry in Glasgow.

Printing presses soon followed, though, and the first Gaelic-language books printed in Canada, all of which were Presbyterian religious books, were published at Pictou, Nova Scotia, and Charlottetown, Prince Edward Island, in 1832. The first Gaelic language books published in Toronto and Montreal, which were also Presbyterian religious books, appeared between 1835 and 1836. The first Catholic religious books published in the Gaelic-language were printed at Pictou in 1836.

=== Red River colony ===
In 1812, Thomas Douglas, 5th Earl of Selkirk obtained 300,000 square kilometres (120,000 sq mi) to build a colony at the forks of the Red River, in what would become Manitoba. With the help of his employee and friend, Archibald McDonald, Selkirk sent over 70 Scottish settlers, many of whom spoke only Gaelic, and had them establish a small farming colony there. The settlement soon attracted local First Nations groups, resulting in an unprecedented interaction of Scottish (Lowland, Highland, and Orcadian), English, Cree, French, Ojibwe, Saulteaux, and Métis traditions all in close contact.

In the 1840s, Toronto Anglican priest John Black was sent to preach to the settlement, but "his lack of the Gaelic was at first a grievous disappointment" to parishioners. With continuing immigration the population of Scots colonists grew to more than 300, but by the 1860s the French–Métis outnumbered the Scots, and tensions between the two groups would prove a major factor in the ensuing Red River Rebellion.

The continuing association between the Selkirk colonists and surrounding First Nations groups evolved into a unique contact language. Used primarily by the Anglo– and Scots–Métis traders, the "Red River Dialect" or Bungi was a mixture of Gaelic and English with many terms borrowed from the local native languages. Whether the dialect was a trade pidgin or a fully developed mixed language is unknown. Today the Scots–Métis have largely been absorbed by the more dominant French–Métis culture, and the Bungi dialect is most likely extinct.

=== Status in the 19th- and early 20th-century ===
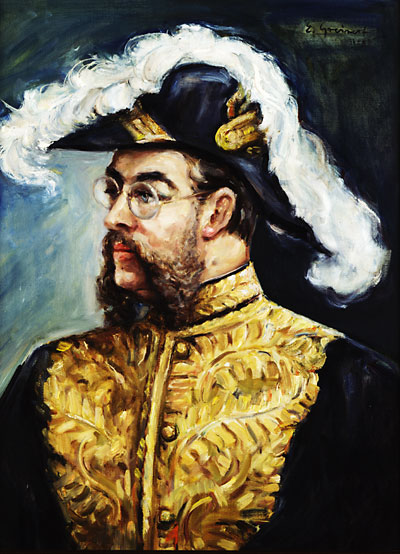
Thomas Robert McInnes (Canadian Gaelic: Tòmas Raibeart Mac Aonghais)

James Gillanders of Highfield Cottage near Dingwall, was the Factor for the estate of Major Charles Robertson of Kincardine and, as his employer was then serving with the British Army in Australia, Gillanders was the person most responsible for the mass evictions staged at Glencalvie, Ross-shire in 1845. A Gaelic-language poem denouncing Gillanders for the brutality of the evictions was later submitted anonymously to Pàdraig MacNeacail, the editor of the column in Canadian Gaelic in which the poem was later published in the Nova Scotia newspaper The Casket. The poem, which is believed to draw upon eyewitness accounts, is believed to be the only Gaelic-language source relating to the evictions in Glencalvie.

By 1850, Gaelic was the third most-common mother tongue in British North America after English and French (when excluding Indigenous languages), and is believed to have been spoken by more than 200,000 British North Americans at that time. A large population who spoke the related Irish immigrated to Scots Gaelic communities and to Irish settlements in Newfoundland.

In Prince Edward Island, Cape Breton and Glengarry there were large areas of Gaelic unilingualism, and communities of Gaelic-speakers had established themselves in northeastern Nova Scotia (around Pictou and Antigonish); in Glengarry, Stormont, Grey, and Bruce Counties in Ontario; in the Codroy Valley of Newfoundland; in Winnipeg, Manitoba; and Eastern Quebec.

In 1890, Thomas Robert McInnes, an independent Senator from British Columbia (born Lake Ainslie, Cape Breton Island) tabled a bill entitled "An Act to Provide for the Use of Gaelic in Official Proceedings." He cited the ten Scottish and eight Irish senators who spoke Gaelic, and 32 members of the House of Commons of Canada who spoke either Scottish Gaelic or Irish. The bill was defeated 42–7.

Despite the widespread disregard by government on Gaelic issues, records exist of at least one criminal trial conducted entirely in Gaelic. It was conducted "in the provincial judicial system sometime during the term (1881–1904) of Chief Justice James MacDonald of Bridgeville, Pictou County." This was only possible as all people involved happened to know the language, and thus "by common consent it was agreed to conduct the whole proceedings in the Gaelic language."

From the mid-19th century to the early 1930s, several Gaelic-language newspapers were published in Canada, although the greatest concentration of such papers was in Cape Breton. From 1840 to 1841, Cuairtear nan Coillte (lit. 'Woodland Walk') was published in Kingston, Ontario, and in 1851, Eòin Boidhdeach launched the monthly An Cuairtear Òg Gaelach (lit. 'The Gaelic Tourist') in Antigonish, Nova Scotia, which lasted a year before being replaced by the English-language Antigonish Casket, which initially occasional Gaelic-language material. On Cape Breton, several Gaelic-language newspapers were published in Sydney. The longest-lasting was Mac-Talla (lit. 'The Echo'), published by Jonathon G. MacKinnon from 1892 to 1904. Mac-Talla began as a weekly, but reduced its frequency to biweekly over time. Later, during the 1920s, several new Scottish Gaelic-language newspapers launched, including the Teachdaire nan Gàidheal (lit. 'The Messenger of the Gaels'), which included Gaelic-language lessons; the United Church–affiliated An Solus Iùil (lit. 'The Guiding Light'); and MacKinnon's later endeavor, Fear na Cèilidh (lit. 'The Entertainer').

In 1917, Rev. Murdoch Lamont (1865–1927), a Gaelic-speaking Presbyterian minister from Orwell, Queen's County, Prince Edward Island, published a small, vanity press booklet titled, An Cuimhneachain: Òrain Céilidh Gàidheal Cheap Breatuinn agus Eilean-an-Phrionnsa ("The Remembrance: Céilidh Songs of the Cape Breton and Prince Edward Island Gaels") in Quincy, Massachusetts. Due to Rev. Lamont's pamphlet, the most complete versions survive of the oral poetry composed in Gaelic upon Prince Edward Island.

== Reasons for decline ==
Despite the long history of Gaels and their language and culture in Canada, the Gaelic speech population started to decline after 1850. This drop was a result of prejudice (both from outside, and from within the Gaelic community itself), aggressive dissuasion in school and government, and the perceived prestige of English.

Gaelic has faced widespread prejudice in Great Britain for generations, and those feelings were easily transposed to British North America.

The fact that Gaelic had not received official status in its homeland made it easier for Canadian legislators to disregard the concerns of domestic speakers. Legislators questioned why "privileges should be asked for Highland Scotchmen in [the Canadian Parliament] that are not asked for in their own country". Politicians who themselves spoke the language held opinions that would today be considered misinformed; Lunenburg Senator Henry Kaulback, in response to Thomas Robert McInnes's Gaelic bill, described the language as only "well suited to poetry and fairy tales". The belief that certain languages had inherent strengths and weaknesses was typical in the 19th century, but has been rejected by modern linguistics.

Around 1880, Am Bàrd Mac Dhiarmaid from The North Shore, wrote "An Té a Chaill a' Ghàidhlig" (lit. 'The Woman who Lost the Gaelic', also known in English as "The Yankee Girl"), a humorous song recounting the growing phenomenon of Gaels shunning their mother-tongue.

Chuir mi fàilte oirr' gu càirdeil:
"Dé mar a tha thu, seann leannan?"
Gun do shìn mi mo làmh dhi,
's thug mi dha dhe na crathadh.
...
Fhreagair ise gu nàimhdeil:
"You're a Scotchman I reckon.
I don't know your Gaelic,
Perhaps you are from Cape Breton."

I welcomed her with affection:
"How are you old sweetheart?"
I held out my hand,
But she ignored it.
...
She answered haughtily:
"You're a Scotchman I reckon.
I don't know your Gaelic,
Perhaps you are from Cape Breton."

With the outbreak of World War II, the Canadian government attempted to prevent the use of Gaelic on public telecommunications systems. The government believed Gaelic was used by subversives affiliated with Ireland, a neutral country perceived to be tolerant of the Nazis. In Prince Edward Island and Cape Breton where the Gaelic language was strongest, it was actively discouraged in schools with corporal punishment. Children were beaten with the maide-crochaidh ('hanging stick') if caught speaking Gaelic.

Job opportunities for unilingual Gaels were few and restricted to the dwindling Gaelic-communities, compelling most into the mines or the fishery. Many saw English fluency as the key to success, and for the first time in Canadian history Gaelic-speaking parents were teaching their children to speak English en masse. The sudden stop of Gaelic language acquisition, caused by shame and prejudice, was the immediate cause of the drastic decline in Gaelic fluency in the 20th century.

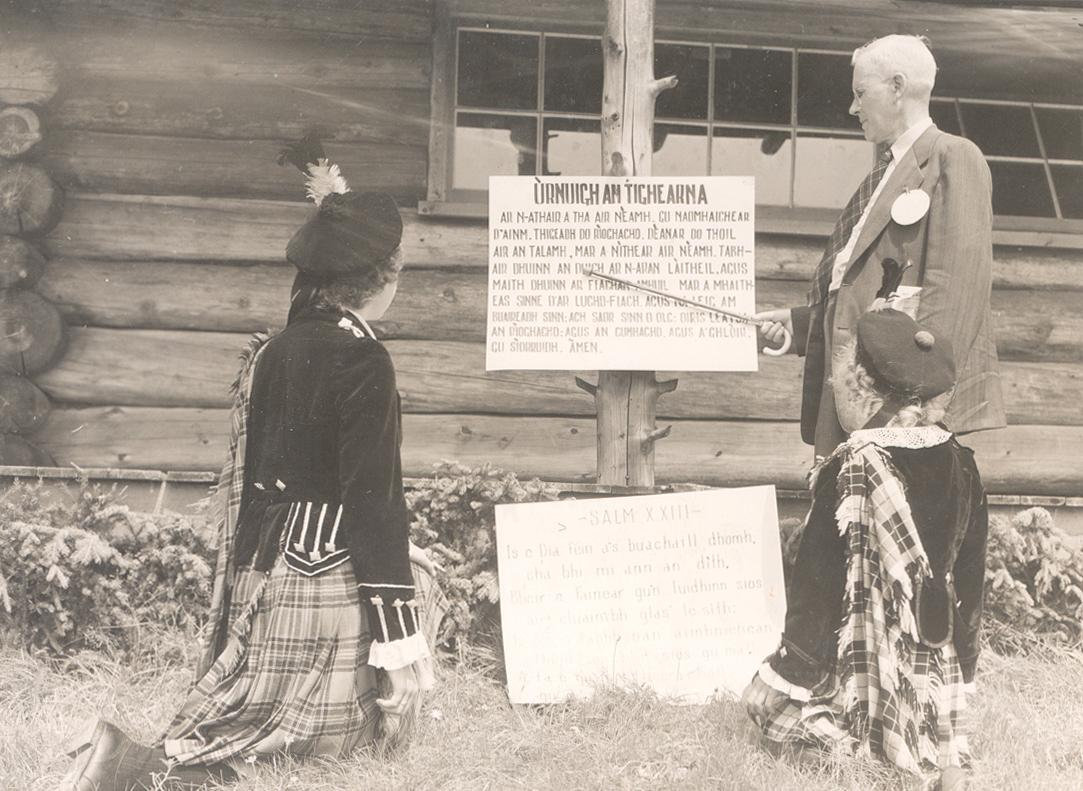
Efforts to preserve the language included traditional Gaelic song tuition, as shown here in Baddeck, c. 1951

According to Antigonish County Gaelic poet and politician Lewis MacKinnon, "We are just like the native peoples here, our culture is indigenous to this region. We too have suffered injustices, we too have been excluded, we too have been forgotten and ridiculed for something that is simply part of who and what we are. It's part of our human expression and that story needs to be told."

Ultimately the population dropped from a peak of 200,000 in 1850, to 80,000 in 1900, to 30,000 in 1930 and 500–1,000 today. There are no longer entire communities of Canadian Gaelic-speakers, although traces of the language and pockets of speakers are relatively commonplace on Cape Breton, and especially in traditional strongholds like Christmas Island, The North Shore, and Baddeck.

== Contemporary language, culture, and arts initiatives ==
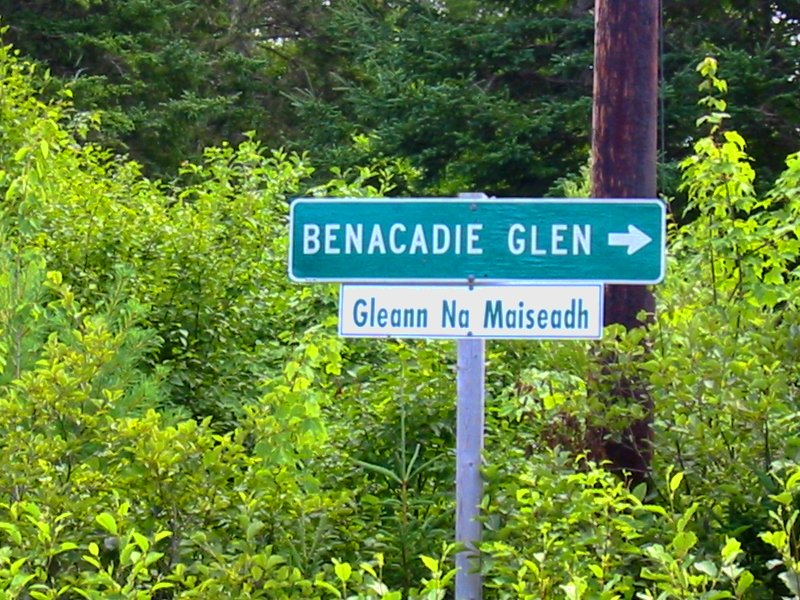
Bilingual sign, Cape Breton, Nova Scotia

A. W. R. MacKenzie founded the Nova Scotia Gaelic College at St Ann's in 1939. St Francis Xavier University in Antigonish has a Celtic Studies department with Gaelic-speaking faculty members, and is the only such university department outside Scotland to offer four full years of Scottish Gaelic instruction.

Eòin Boidhdeach of Antigonish published the monthly Gaelic magazine An Cuairtear Òg Gaelach (lit. 'The Gaelic Tourist') around 1851. The world's longest-running Gaelic periodical, Mac-Talla (lit. 'The Echo'), was printed by Jonathon G. MacKinnon for 11 years between 1892 and 1904, in Sydney. However, MacKinnon's mockery of complaints over Mac-Talla's regular misprints and his tendency to financially guilt trip his subscribers, ultimately led local Gaelic poet Alasdair a' Ridse MacDhòmhnaill to lampoon Mac-Talla and its editor in two separate works of satirical poetry: Òran Càinidh do Mhac-Talla ('A Song of Revile to Mac-Talla') and Aoir Mhic-Talla ('The Satire of Mac-Talla').

Eòin and Seòras MacShuail, believed to be the only black speakers of Goidelic languages in Canada, were born in Cape Breton and in adulthood became friends with Rudyard Kipling, who in 1896 wrote Captains Courageous, which featured an isolated Gaelic-speaking African-Canadian cook from Cape Breton.

Many English-speaking writers and artists of Scottish-Canadian ancestry have featured Canadian Gaelic in their works, among them Alistair MacLeod (No Great Mischief), Ann-Marie MacDonald (Fall on Your Knees), and D.R. MacDonald (Cape Breton Road). Gaelic singer Mary Jane Lamond has released several albums in the language, including the 1997 hit Hòro Ghoid thu Nighean ('Jenny Dang the Weaver'). Cape Breton fiddling is a unique tradition of Gaelic and Acadian styles, known in fiddling circles worldwide.

Several Canadian schools use the "Gael" as a mascot, the most prominent being Queen's University in Kingston, Ontario. The school cheer of Queen's University is "Oilthigh na Bànrighinn a' Bhànrighinn gu bràth!" ('The Queen's College and Queen forever!'), and is traditionally sung after scoring a touchdown in football matches. The university's team is nicknamed the Golden Gaels.

The Gaelic character of Nova Scotia has influenced that province's industry and traditions. Glen Breton Rare, produced in Cape Breton, is one of the very few single malt whiskies to be made outside Scotland.

Gaelic settlers in Nova Scotia adapted the popular Highland winter sport of shinty (Scottish Gaelic: camanachd, iomain), which was traditionally played by the Gaels upon St. Andrew's Day, Christmas Day, New Year's Day, Handsel Monday, and Candlemas, to the much colder Canadian winter climate by playing on frozen lakes while wearing ice skates. This led to the creation of the modern sport known as ice hockey.

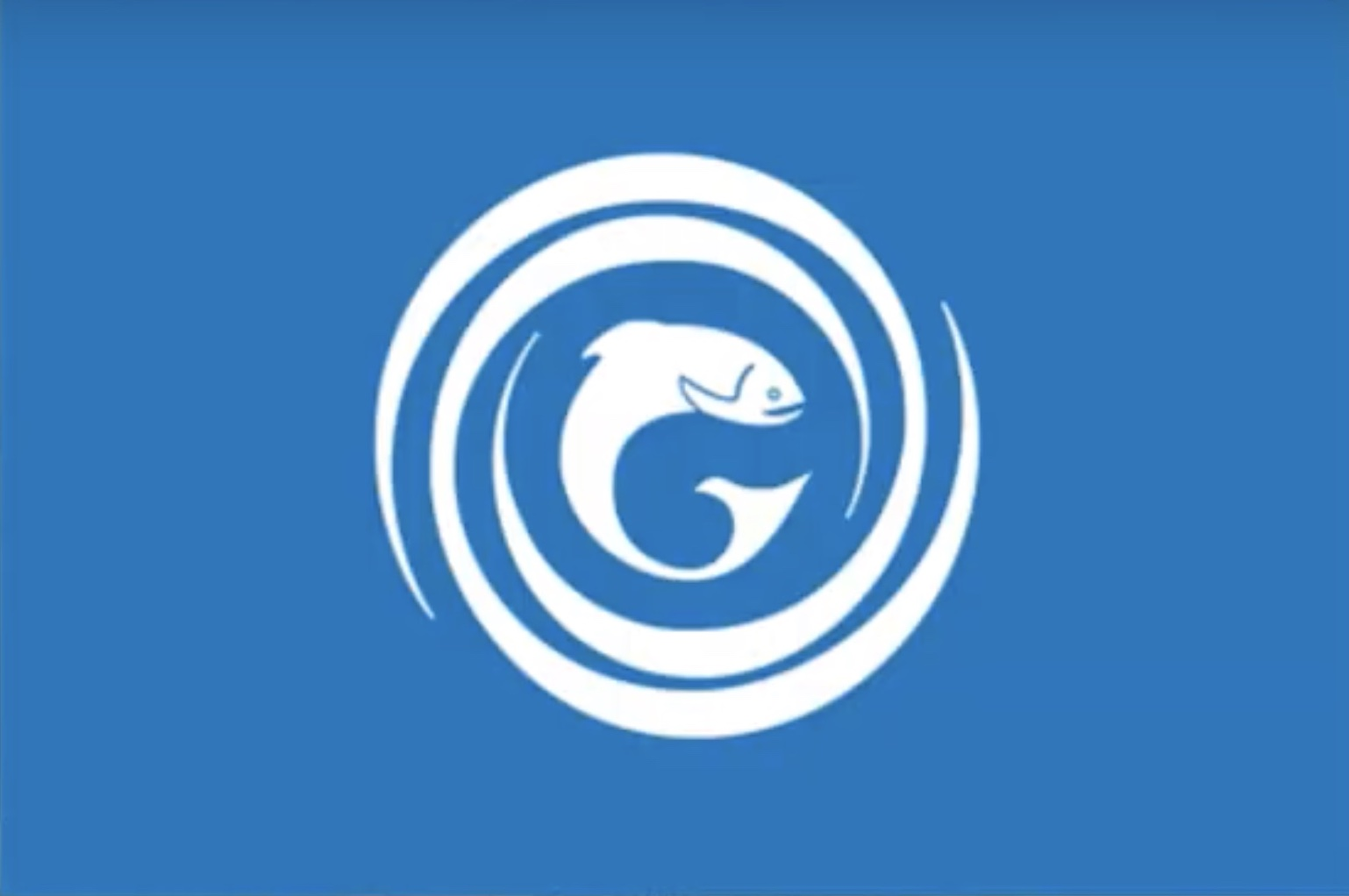
The Nova Scotia Gaelic Flag, introduced in 2008

According to Margie Beaton, who emigrated from Scotland to Nova Scotia to teach the Gaelic language there in 1976, "In teaching the language here I find that they already have the blas, the sound of the Gaelic even in their English. It's part of who they are, you can't just throw that away. It's in you."

While performing in 2000 at the annual Cèilidh at Christmas Island, Cape Breton, Barra native and legendary Gaelic singer Flora MacNeil spread her arms wide and cried, "You are my people!" The hundreds of Canadian-born Gaels in the audience immediately erupted into loud cheers.

According to Natasha Sumner, the current literary and cultural revival of the Gaelic language in Nova Scotia was largely instigated by Kenneth E. Nilsen (1941–2012), an American linguist with a specialty in Celtic languages. During his employment as Professor of Gaelic Studies at St. Francis Xavier University in Antigonish, Nilsen was known for his contagious enthusiasm for both teaching and recording the distinctive Nova Scotia dialect of the Gaelic-language, its folklore, and its oral literature. Several important leaders in the recent Canadian Gaelic revival, including the poet Lewis MacKinnon (Lodaidh MacFhionghain), have credited Nilsen with sparking their interest in learning the Gaelic language and in actively fighting for its survival.

During his time as Professor of Gaelic Studies, Nilsen would take his students every year to visit the grave of the Tiree-born Bard Iain mac Ailein (John MacLean) (1787–1848) at Glenbard, Antigonish County, Nova Scotia. Following Nilsen's death in 2012, MacKinnon composed a Gaelic-language poetic lament for his former teacher, entitled Do Choinneach Nilsen, M'Oide.

In a 2010 interview Scottish-born Gaelic teacher Margie Beaton said that in Scotland, "The motto they have for Nova Scotia is Ach an cuan, which translates as 'but for the ocean', meaning 'but for the ocean we'd actually be together. There's only an ocean separating us. We're like another island off the coast of Scotland but we have an ocean separating us instead of a strait or a channel."

The first Gaelic language film to be made in North America, The Wake of Calum MacLeod (Faire Chaluim Mhic Leòid) is a six-minute short filmed in Cape Breton.

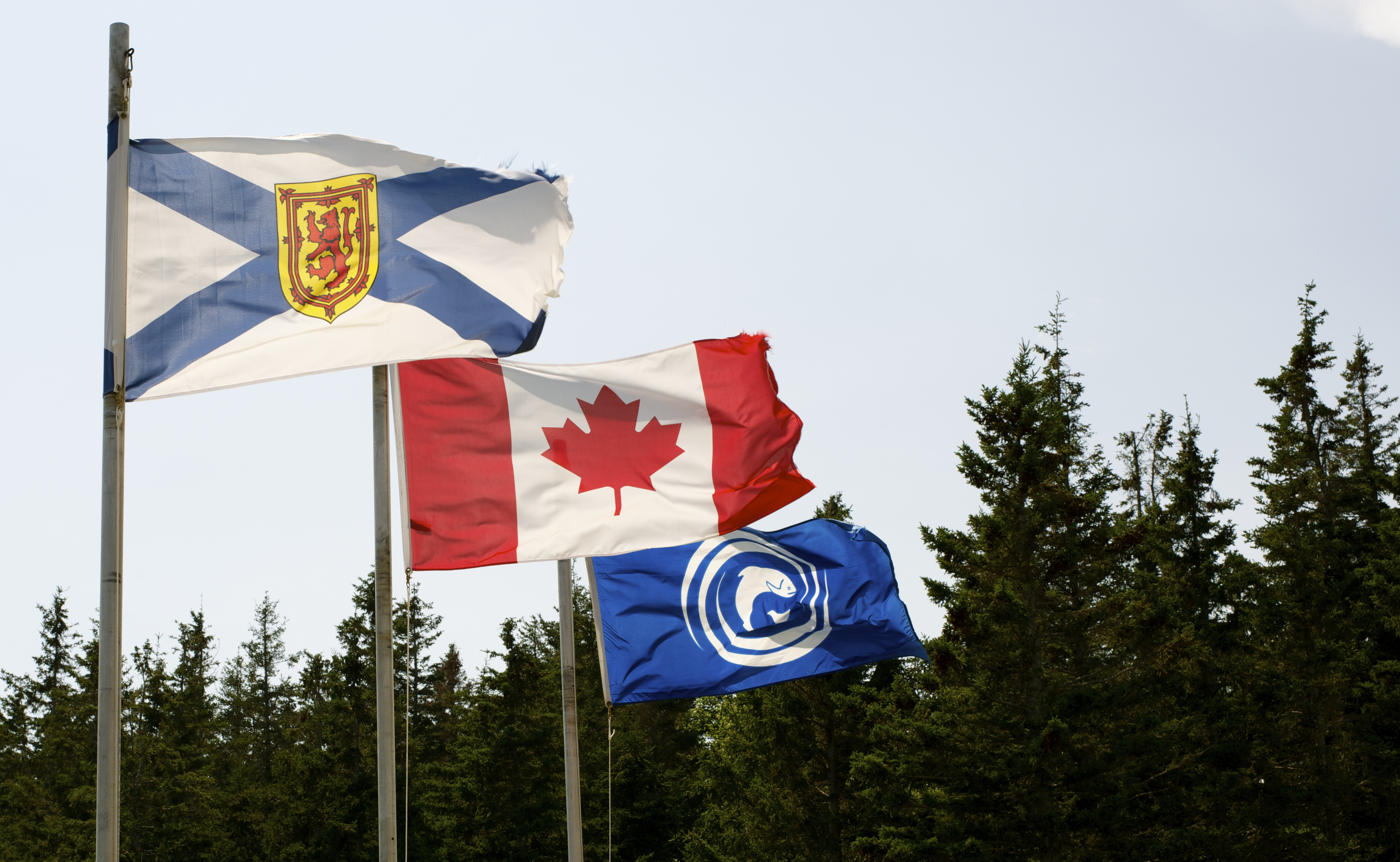
The Nova Scotia Gaelic Flag flying alongside the Flag of Canada and Flag of Nova Scotia

In a major innovation, the 2011 Royal National Mòd, held at Stornoway on the Isle of Lewis, crowned Lewis MacKinnon (Lodaidh MacFhionghain), a poet in Canadian Gaelic from Antigonish County, Nova Scotia, as the winning Bard. It was the first time in the 120-year history of the Mòd that a writer of Gaelic poetry from the Scottish diaspora had won the Bardic Crown (Scottish Gaelic: Crùn na Bàrdachd).

The Gaelic scholar Michael Newton made a half-hour documentary, Singing Against the Silence (2012), about the revival of Nova Scotia Gaelic in that language; he has also published an anthology of Canadian Gaelic literature, Seanchaidh na Coille (2015).

Lewis MacKinnon's 2017 Gaelic poetry collection Ràithean airson Sireadh ("Seasons for Seeking"), includes both his original poetry and his literary translations of the Persian poetry of Sufi mystic Rumi, all of which are themed around the seasons of the year.

== Outlook and development ==
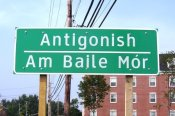
Antigonish, Nova Scotia

Efforts to address the decline specifically of Gaelic language in Nova Scotia began in the late 1980s. Two conferences on the status of Gaelic language and culture held on Cape Breton Island set the stage. Starting in the late 1990s, the Nova Scotia government began studying ways it might enhance Gaelic in the province.

In December 2006 the Office of Gaelic Affairs was established.

In Prince Edward Island, the Colonel Gray High School now offers both an introductory and an advanced course in Gaelic; both language and history are taught in these classes. This is the first recorded time that Gaelic has ever been taught as an official course on Prince Edward Island.

Maxville Public School in Maxville, Glengarry, Ontario, Canada offers Scottish Gaelic lessons weekly. The last "fluent" Gaelic-speaker in Ontario, descended from the original settlers of Glengarry County, died in 2001.

The province of British Columbia is host to the Comunn Gàidhlig Bhancoubhair (The Gaelic Society of Vancouver), the Vancouver Gaelic Choir, the Victoria Gaelic Choir, as well as the annual Gaelic festival Mòd Vancouver. The city of Vancouver's Scottish Cultural Centre also holds seasonal Scottish Gaelic evening classes.

=== Government ===
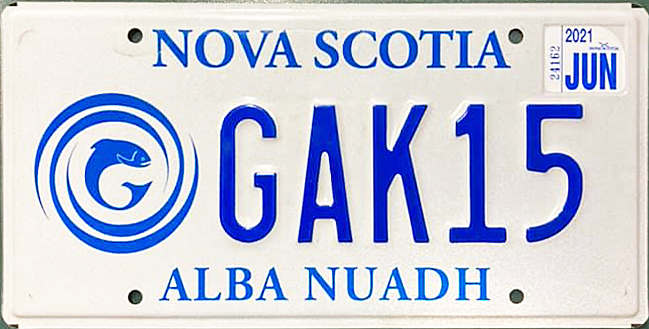
Bilingual (Latin/Gaelic) licence plates were introduced in Nova Scotia in 2018

An economic impact study completed by the Nova Scotia government in 2002 estimates that the survival of Canadian Gaelic in the Province generates over C$23.5 million in tourism revenue every year, with nearly 380,000 people attending approximately 2,070 Gaelic events annually. This study inspired a subsequent report, the Gaelic Preservation Strategy, which polled the community's desire to preserve Gaelic while seeking consensus on adequate reparative measures.

These two documents are watersheds in the timeline of Canadian Gaelic, representing the first concrete steps taken by a provincial government to recognize the language's decline and engage local speakers in reversing this trend. The documents recommend community development, strengthening education, legislating road signs and publications, and building ties between the Gaelic community and other Nova Scotia "heritage language" communities Mi'kmaq, Acadian French and African Nova Scotian.

Increased ties were called for between Nova Scotia and Scotland, and the first such agreement, the Memorandum of Understanding, was signed in 2002.

=== Education ===
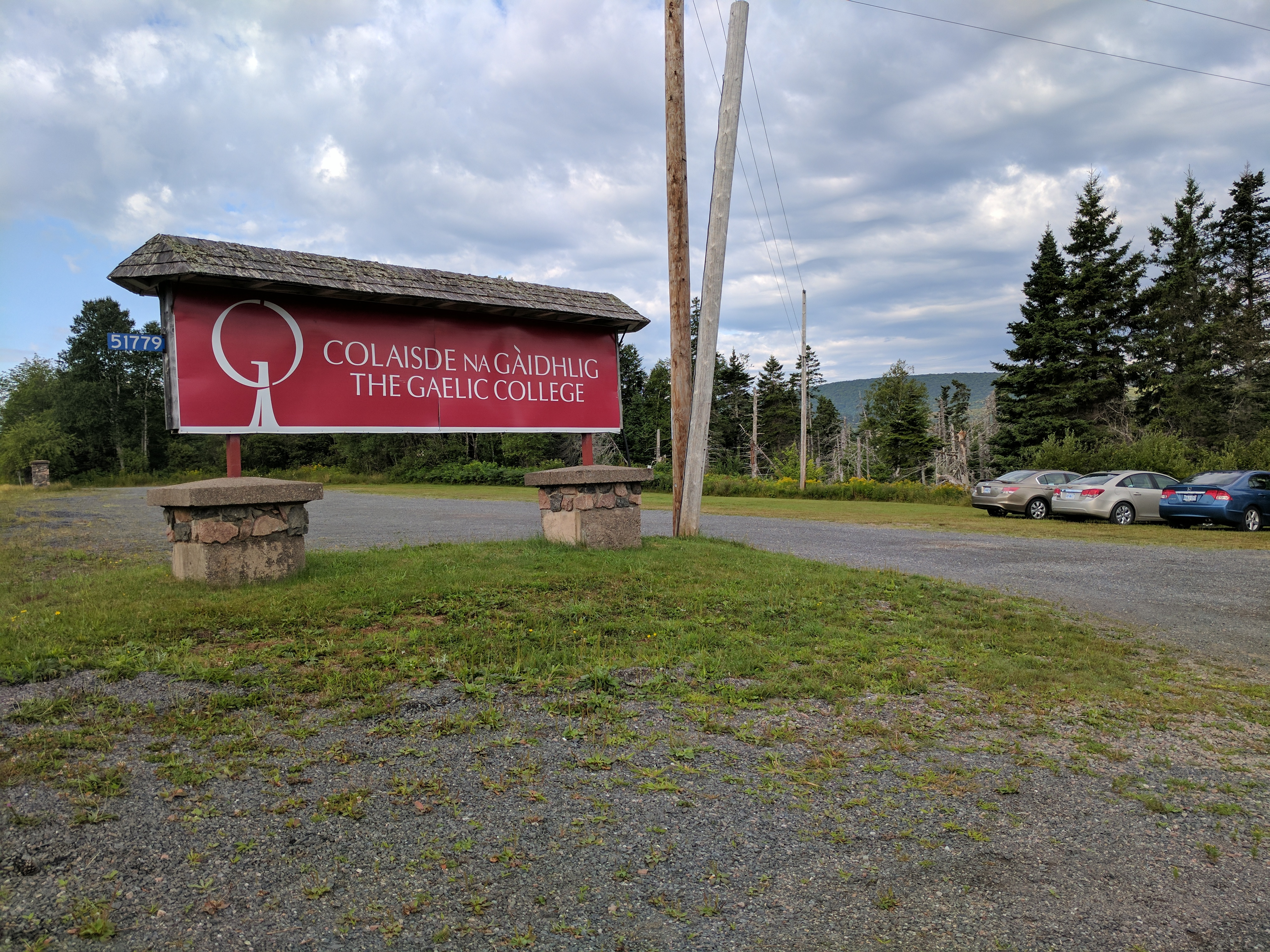
Entrance sign to The Gaelic College

Today over a dozen public institutions offer Gaelic courses, (such as a Canadian History course in Gaelic at North Nova Education Centre, Nova Scotia) in addition to advanced programmes conducted at Cape Breton, St Francis Xavier, and Saint Mary's Universities.

The Nova Scotia Highland Village Museum offers a bilingual interpretation site, presenting Gaelic and English interpretation for visitors and offering programmes for the local community members and the general public.

The Gaelic College in St. Anns offers Gaelic immersion weekends, weeks and summer programs.

Sponsored by local Gaelic organizations and societies, ongoing Gaelic language adult immersion classes involving hundreds of individuals are held in over a dozen communities in the province. These immersion programs focus on learning language through activity, props and repetition. Reading, writing and grammar are introduced after the student has had a minimum amount of exposure to hearing and speaking Gaelic through everyday contextualized activities. The grouping of immersion methodologies and exposure to Gaelic cultural expression in immersion settings is referred to in Nova Scotia as Gàidhlig aig Baile.

In 2021, Taigh Sgoile na Drochaide (lit. 'Bridge Schoolhouse') (fig. Mabou Schoolhouse) in Mabou, Cape Breton, opened as the first Gaelic-medium primary school in North America.

== Linguistic features ==
The phonology of some Canadian Gaelic dialects have diverged in several ways from the standard Gaelic spoken in Scotland, while others have remained the same. According to Antigonish County poet Lewis MacKinnon, "The dialect of Gaelic that I speak... doesn't exist anymore in Scotland."

Gaelic terms unique to Canada exist, though research on the exact number is deficient. The language has also had a considerable effect on Cape Breton English.

=== Phonology ===
- l̪ˠ → w
  - The most common Canadian Gaelic shibboleth, where broad /l̪ˠ/ is pronounced as [w] (as with Ł in Polish). This form was well known in Western Scotland where it was called the glug Eigeach ("Eigg cluck"), for its strong association with speakers from the Isle of Eigg.
- n̪ˠ → m
  - When /n̪ˠ/ occurs after a rounded vowel, speakers tend to pronounce it as [m].
- n̪ˠ → w
  - This form is limited mostly to the plural ending -annan, where the -nn- sequence is pronounced as [w].

=== Vocabulary ===
- lodan noun a velvet offering pouch for church.
- mogan noun a term which refers to a heavy ankle sock sold with a rubberized sole that was worn in Cape Breton for decades. The term also refers to a pull-on leg warmer for use when wearing the kilt in cold climates.
- pàirc-coillidh noun a wooded clearing burnt for planting crops, literally "forest park".
- dreag noun a will-o'-the-wisp.
- sgeatadh verb a Gaelicisation of the English verb "to skate".
- seant (pl. seantaichean) noun a Gaelicisation of the English noun "cent". The term dolair is used in Canada and the U.S. instead of the word not, which refers to a British pound. "Sgillinn" is used both in Canada and Scotland to refer to coins.
- smuglair noun a Gaelicisation of the English word smuggler.
- ponndadh verb a Gaelicisation of the English verb "to pound". That this may have been used in Cape Breton instead of bualadh is evidence of the influence of English.

- trì sgillinn phrasal noun a nickel. (literally "three pence").
- sia sgillinn phrasal noun a dime. (literally "six pence").
- tastan phrasal noun twenty cents. (literally "a shilling").
- dà thastan agus sia sgillinn phrasal noun fifty cents. (literally "two shillings and six pence").
- còig tastan phrasal noun a dollar. (literally "five shillings").
- stòr noun a Gaelicisation of the English noun "store". Although the word stòr does refer to a storage building as well as wealth, the Gaelic term "bùth" is sometimes used amongst Gaelic speakers in Nova Scotia today.
- taigh-obrach noun workhouse (penitentiary).
- bangaid noun a feast.
- Na Machraichean Mòra noun The Canadian Prairies.
- buna-bhuachaille noun common loon.

- poidhle noun collective noun, e.g. "poidhle airgid" ("a lot of money"), or "poidhle de dhaoine" ("a lot of people") A Gaelicisation of the English word "pile", possibly influenced by the Gaelic expression "tòrr" of similar usage and meaning.
- triop or trup noun "trip" or "turn". Same usage and meaning as Gaelic turas. Also used in certain Gaelic dialects in Scotland.
- a' wondradh verbal noun wondering.

=== Gaelic in Nova Scotia English ===
- boomaler noun a boor, oaf, bungler.
- sgudal noun garbage (sgudal). Also used in Gaelic in Scotland.
- skiff noun a deep blanket of snow covering the ground. (from sguabach or sgiobhag).

== List of Scottish Gaelic place names in Canada ==
Names on Cape Breton Island (Eilean Cheap Breatainn)

- Glendale: Bràigh na h-Aibhneadh
- Inverness: Baile Inbhir Nis or An Sithean
- Chimney Corner: Cùil an t-Simileir
- Long Point: An Rubha Fada
- Judique: Siùdaig Mhór
- Mabou: Màbu or An Drochaid
- Southwest Margaree: Bràigh na h-Aibhne
- Whycocomagh: Hogama
- Ainslie Glen: Gleann nam Màgan
- Craigmore: A' Chreag Mhór
- Baddeck: Badaig
- Iona: Sanndraigh
- The North Shore: An Cladach a Tuath
- St Ann's: Baile Anna
- Englishtown: Baile nan Gall
- Christmas Island: Eilean na Nollaig
- Big Beach: An Tràigh Mhòr
- Grand Mira: A' Mhira Mhòr
- Big Pond: Am Pòn Mòr
- Loch Lomond: Loch Laomainn
- Marion Bridge: Drochaid Mhira
- Sydney: Baile Shidni
- Grand River: Abhainn Mhòr
- Port Hastings: Còbh a' Phlàstair
- Port Hawkesbury: Baile a' Chlamhain or An Gut
- Neil's Harbour: Acarsaid Nèill

Names in mainland Nova Scotia (Tìr-mór na h-Albann Nuaidh)

- Antigonish Am Baile Mòr
- Arisaig Àrasaig
- Broad Cove: An Caolas Leathann
- Giant's Lake Loch an Fhamhair
- Halifax Halafacs, or an t-Àrd-Bhaile
- New Glasgow Am Baile Beag or Glaschu Nuadh or Glaschu Ùr
- Pictou Baile Phiogto
- Stellarton Meinnean na h-Albann
- Westville Baile an Iar
- Trenton Baile na Stàilinn

Elsewhere in Canada

- Glengarry County, Ont. Siorrachd Gleanna Garadh
- Bruce County, Ont. Siorramachd Bhruis
- Nova Scotia Alba Nuadh or Alba Ùr
- Sable Island (part of Nova Scotia) Eilean Gainmhich
- Newfoundland Talamh an Èisg or Eilein a' Trosg
- Prince Edward Island: Eilean Eòin or An t-Eilean Dearg; Eilean a' Phrionnsa
- Lewes, Prince Edward Island An Tuirc
- New Brunswick Bronsuic Ùr
- Quebec Cuibèg
- Calgary, Alberta Calgarraidh
- Vancouver Bhancoubhair
- Stornoway, Quebec Steòrnabhagh

== See also ==
- Scottish Gaelic
- Bungi Creole
- List of Scottish place names in Canada

== Sources ==
- Seanchaidh na Coille/Memory-Keeper of the Forest. Anthology of Scottish-Gaelic Literature of Canada in original Gaelic with English translation, with historical and literary commentary. (in Scottish Gaelic) (in English)
- Iomairtean na Gàidhlig. Gaelic Affairs Division, Government of Nova Scotia. (in Scottish Gaelic) (in English)
- Cainnt mo Mhàthar. Digital audio/visual archives of Canadian Gaels speaking Gaelic. (in Scottish Gaelic) (in English)
- Virtual Museum Exhibit on Cape Breton Gaelic Culture
- Work through Time Audio and text archive of Cape Breton histories. (in Scottish Gaelic) (in English, French, and Mi'kmaq)
- Gaelic Economic-impact Study. Nova Scotia government report on Gaelic. (in Scottish Gaelic) (in English)
- Gaelic Preservation Strategy. Nova Scotia government strategy proposal. (in Scottish Gaelic) (in English)
- The Encyclopædia of Canada's Cultures: The Case of Gaelic
- Scottish Gaelic College of Celtic Arts and Crafts
- Gaelic Placenames in Nova Scotia
- Gaelic Map of Nova Scotia (in Scottish Gaelic)
- Gaelic Placenames of Scotland and Canada
- Nova Scotia Gaelic Visual Archives
- Highland Village Museum/An Clachan Gàidhealach, Iona, Nova Scotia
- Gaelic in Prince Edward Island
- Leugh Seo Gaelic Collection of the Cape Breton Library (in Scottish Gaelic) (in English)
- Cape Breton Cèilidh (in French and English)
- St Francis Xavier University Gaelic Resources (in Scottish Gaelic) (in French and English)
- 'Se Ceap Breatainn Tìr Mo Ghràidh. Part One and Part Two. Scottish documentary on Canadian Gaelic-speaking community . (in Scottish Gaelic)
- Aiseirigh nan Gàidheal. Canadian Gaelic radio show. (in Scottish Gaelic) (in English)
- Mac-Talla. Canadian Gaelic newspaper, 540 issues. (in Scottish Gaelic)
- Fiosrachadh 'o'n Luchd-riaghlaidh mo Dheighinn Chanada. 1892. Book describing life in Canada, by Ùghdarras Pàrlamaid Chanada.(in Scottish Gaelic)
- Machraichean Mòra Chanada. 1907. Book describing immigration to the Canadian Prairies.(in Scottish Gaelic)
- White people, Indians, and Highlanders: tribal peoples and colonial encounters in Scotland and North America. Calloway, Colin Gordon.
- Speaking Canadian English: an informal account of the English language in Canada. Orkin, Mark M.
- Canadian History: Beginnings to Confederation. Taylor, Martin Brook & Owram, Doug.
- Language in Canada. Edwards, John R.
- Bilingualism and language death
- Transactions of the Gaelic Society of Inverness. Vol.s III & IV. 1873-4, 1874–5.
- Na h-Albannaich agus Canada (in Scottish Gaelic) (in English)
- 19th century Ontario Gaelic song. (in English)
