= St. Paul's Presbyterian Church =

St. Paul's Presbyterian Church may refer to:

- St Paul's Presbyterian Church, Spring Hill, a heritage-listed Presbyterian church in Brisbane, Queensland, Australia
- St Paul's Uniting Church, Mackay or St Paul's Presbyterian Church, Queensland, Australia
- St. Paul's Presbyterian Church Merigomish, a Presbyterian congregation in Nova Scotia, Canada
- St. Paul's Presbyterian Church, Glace Bay, a Presbyterian congregation in Nova Scotia, Canada
- St. Paul's Presbyterian Church (Hamilton, Ontario), a congregation of the Presbyterian Church in Canada
- St. Paul's Presbyterian Church (Leaskdale), a Presbyterian Church in Canada congregation in Uxbridge Township, Ontario, Canada
- St. Paul's Presbyterian Church (Peterborough, Ontario), a Presbyterian Church in Canada congregation
- Central Presbyterian Church (Saint Paul, Minnesota), US
- St. Paul's German Presbyterian Church and Cemetery, a historic place in Elmont, New York, US
- St. Paul's Presbyterian Church (Somerset, Pennsylvania), US, an NRHP historic district contributing property
- St. Paul Presbyterian Church (Lowland, Tennessee), US
- St. Paul's Presbyterian Church (Charleston, West Virginia), US, an NRHP historic district contributing property

== See also ==
- St. Paul Church (disambiguation)
