= Hope Church =

Hope Church may refer to:

- Hope Church (Belo Horizonte), Reformed church
- Hope Church of All Saints, Kent England, ruined church
- Hope Church (Memphis, Tennessee), Presbyterian church
- Hope Church (Charleston, West Virginia), Anglican church

== See also ==
- Hope City Church
- Hope Lutheran Church
