= Iain mac Ailein =

Canadian poet of Scottish descent

Iain mac Ailein, or John MacLean (8 Jan 1787, Caolas, Tiree – 26 Jan 1848, Addington Forks, Antigonish County, Nova Scotia) was a poet in both Scottish Gaelic literature and in that of Canadian Gaelic. He served as the chief bard to the 15th chief of Clan MacLean of Coll. After emigrating with his family to Nova Scotia in 1819, MacLean remained a prolific poet and composed one of the most famous and most popular Scottish Gaelic emigration poems, Òran do dh' Aimearaga ("A Song to America"), which is also known as, A' Choille Ghruamach ("The Gloomy Forest"). Robert Dunbar has dubbed him, "perhaps the most important of all the poets who emigrated during the main period of Gaelic overseas emigration", which took place between 1730 and 1860.

== Life ==
=== Ancestry ===
MacLean's maternal great-grandfather was Neil Lamont, who had been chief bard to the Chief of Clan Maclean of Coll. On his father's side, MacLean was related to the famous Tiree poet Gilleasbuig Làidir MacGilleain.

=== Early life ===
Iain mac Ailein was born on January 8, 1787, at Caolas, on the island of Tiree, in the Inner Hebrides of Scotland. He was the third son of Allan MacLean and Margaret MacFadyen.

During his early life, MacLean worked as a shoemaker and small scale merchant. His grandson, Presbyterian minister and Canadian Gaelic scholar Rev. Alexander MacLean Sinclair (1840-1924), later wrote that he was also a seanchai and that, "his powerful memory ensured that his stores of information connected with the Highland clans and poets were very great."

MacLean was also very well acquainted with other great works of Scottish Gaelic literature, such as Alasdair Mac Mhaighstir Alasdair's Birlinn Chloinne Raghnaill ("The War Galley of Clanranald") and Duncan Ban MacIntyre's Moladh Beinn Dòrain ("In Praise of Ben Doran"), both of which he knew by heart.

According to his grandson, "Nature gave the poet a mind of great capacity; but evidently it did not intend that he should become a wealthy man. He never attended regularly to his work; his mind was not upon it. Poetry occupied his thoughts when pegging sole-leather in Scotland, and cutting down trees in America; it took complete possession of him. He was a good poet; but a poor shoemaker, and a poor farmer. He was very fond of company. He was clannish, and took pleasure in visiting his friends and acquaintances."

On July 19, 1808, Iain Mac Ailein married Isabella Black in Glasgow.

In 1810, as the Napoleonic Wars were continuing to be fought, Iain mac Ailein was conscripted into the Argyll and Bute Militia. He apparently disliked military life intensely and arranged for a substitute to serve in his place in return for £40. MacLean's discharge papers bear the date of January 17, 1811.

In 1818, Iain mac Ailein published the poetry collection, Orain nuadh Ghaedhlach, le Iain Mac Illeain, ann an Eilean Tirreadh ("New Gaelic Songs Collected by John MacLean on the island of Tiree") at Edinburgh, with a dedication to his employer, Alexander, the 15th Chief of Clan MacLean of Coll. Iain mac Ailein's book consists of 22 poems of his own and 34 by other major Gaelic poets, including poems by Alexander MacKinnon and Mary Macleod that can no longer be found elsewhere.

One of Iain mac Ailein's primary sources, according to Robert Dunbar, was a handwritten manuscript of Gaelic poems which Dr. Hector Maclean of Grulin, Eigg had made between 1738 and 1768. The manuscript was gifted to Iain mac Ailein by the Doctor's daughter and contains an additional 104 pages of material, including fourteen of Iain mac Ailein's own poems. The manuscript is now in the Nova Scotia Archives.

=== New World ===
It is still not known why he chose to emigrate. Iain mac Ailein, as "one of the last professional poets to enjoy any patronage from a chieftain", had a very privileged life compared to other Highland tenant farmers.

It is known that Iain mac Ailein was able, by using his published book as security, to secure passage for himself and his family to the New World. In August 1819, the MacLean family set sail from the port of Tobermory, on the Isle of Mull, aboard the ship Economy and arrived at Pictou, Nova Scotia on about October 1, 1819.

The MacLean family stayed at Pictou only for a week before traveling by boat to Merigomish. They settled first on a homestead at Barney's River, Pictou County. In the summer of 1820, Iain Mac Ailein cleared the land, planted potatoes, and built a small log cabin on the land, which he nicknamed, Baile-Chnoic ("Hill Farm"). While living in this claim Iain Mac Ailein composed his famous protest against the hardship of pioneer life: Òran do dh' Aimearaga ("A Song to America"), better known as A’ Choille Ghruamach ("The Gloomy Forest").

In the poem, according to Marcus Tanner, "MacLean complained about almost everything in Nova Scotia," and, "was intended as a warning to potential emigrants that Nova Scotia was not the land of prosperity they imagined it to be."

According to Effie Rankin, "A' Choille Ghruamach ('The Gloomy Forrest') probably contains the most detailed and vivid account of pioneer life which exists in Gaelic. In this dirge, John MacLean bemoans his fate in the Canadian wilderness, where winter's cold is dreadful, summer's heat is equally oppressive, and always everywhere broods the menacing and invincible forest."

MacLean Sinclair later wrote, "When the poet sent to Tiree his song on America, his friends were greatly distressed about him. They offered to send money to bring him back. MacLean of Coll, his old friend, wrote him a kind letter asking him to return, and offering him a piece of land free of rent. A more truthful poem than his description of America was never penned; yet it is almost a pity that he sent it home. It was no doubt the means of keeping many person's from emigrating."

According to Michael Newton, however, MacLean's A' Choille Ghruamach, which is, "an expression disappointment and regret", ended up becoming, "so well established in the emigrant repertoire that it easily eclipses his later songs taking delight in the Gaelic communities in Nova Scotia and their prosperity."

For example, Iain mac Ailein's 1826 poem Òran a' Bhàil Ghàidhealaich ("The Song of the Gaelic Ball"), was composed for and first performed at a gathering organized by David Murray at Merigomish and to which only Gaelic speakers were invited. The song remains very popular among Gaelic-speakers in both Scotland and Nova Scotia and is often referred to by its first line, Bithibh Aotrom 's Togaibh Fonn ("Be Light-hearted and Raise a Tune").

In 1827, Iain Mac Ailein received a gift of a large and beautiful drinking horn from William Forbes. Iain Mac Ailein celebrated the gift in his poem An Adharc ("The Drinking Horn") and later gave the horn as a gift to his close friend Fr. Colin Grant.

During a weeklong election held at Pictou in September 1830, Iain mac Ailein composed the song, Don Phàrlamaid Ùir ("To the New Parliament") and played a role in mobilizing his fellow Nova Scotia Gaels as voters. According to Michael Newton, "This election played out the tensions between two major provincial bodies, the popularly-elected Colonial Assembly and the Crown-appointed Council. Both of these governmental groups had been dominated by a small elite group consisting of settlers from England and anglophone Loyalists who had relocated to Nova Scotia in the aftermath of the American Revolutionary War. As his grandson... comments in the notes to the song, the ethnic slurs against Gaels that emerged during the campaign galvanized MacGill-Eain into exercising the social role of the poet to call for political and ethnic solidarity."

According to Sinclair, "He took no special role in the election, until he was told that one of the Liberal candidates had made some insulting references to the Highlanders. He then went to work and composed this song. He spent the greater part of the night at it. He sang it [the] next day. Thousands were present. It had a most exciting effect. It's a real brosnachadh-catha" ("incitement to battle").

The MacLean family moved in January 1831 to a new homestead at Glenbard, near Addington Forks, Antigonish County, Nova Scotia.

After he learned of the death of his former patron in 1835, Iain mac Ailein composed the lament, Marbhann do dh'Alastair Mac-Gilleain, Tighearna Chola ("An Elegy for Alexander MacLean, the Laird of Coll").

Also in 1835, Iain mac Ailein published twenty of his works of Christian poetry in Gaelic at Glasgow under the title, Laoidhean Spioradail le Iain MacGilleain ("Spiritual Songs by John MacLean"). Although Sinclair later alleged that the poems in this collection, "were very inaccurately printed", his claim has been disproved by comparisons to a manuscript in Iain mac Ailein's hand that was acquired by the National Library of Scotland in 2011. The manuscript contains all twenty poems as well as six unpublished poems and shows that Iain mac Ailein's Glasgow publisher had actually printed the texts of his poems very accurately.

Following the Disruption of 1843, Iain mac Ailein and his family joined the Nova Scotia branch of the Free Church of Scotland. In this, though, the MacLean family was far from unique. Most Presbyterian Gaels in Nova Scotia, like their co-religionists in the Gàidhealtachd of Scotland, made exactly the same choice.

Despite this fact, Presbyterianism in Nova Scotia was considerably less strict than in an t-Seann Dùthaich ("the Old Country") and, "most of the stern traditions and harsh penalties of the Kirk", were never enforced in the New World. Almost certainly for this reason, Iain mac Ailein felt able to build a very close friendship with Colin P. Grant, the Roman Catholic priest assigned to St. Margaret of Scotland Church in Arisaig. So close was their friendship that Iain mac Ailein composed a work of Canadian Gaelic praise poetry in honor of Grant.

Iain mac Ailein died in Addington Forks, Nova Scotia on January 28, 1848. He became the first person buried in the Glen Bard Cemetery, where his grandson, Sinclair, also lies buried.

In a Canadian Gaelic elegy composed for Iain mac Ailein's death, fellow Antigonish County poet John MacGillivray lamented:

Chaill sinn tuilleadh 's do bhàrdachd,
Ged a tha sinn 'ga h-ionndrainn,
Chaill sinn t' fhiorachadh sàr ghasd.

"We have lost more than your poetry,
Though we certainly miss that,
We have also lost your most excellent knowledge "

== Legacy ==
In the Highlands and Islands of Scotland, MacLean is commonly known as Bàrd Thighearna Chola ("The Bard to the Laird of Coll") or as Iain mac Ailein ("John, son of Allan"). In Nova Scotia, he is known in Canadian Gaelic as, Am Bàrd MacGilleain ("The Bard MacLean") and as, Bàrd Abhainn Bhàrnaidh ("The Bard of Barney's River"), after the location of the MacLean family's original homestead at Barney's River Station, Pictou County, Nova Scotia.

Several of MacLean's songs were very popular during his own lifetime and a significant number have survived to this day among Gaelic singers and tradition-bearers on both sides of the Atlantic Ocean.

Although the Gaels of Tiree have a long history of producing highly gifted songwriters and poets, "MacLean is also considered by some to be the greatest of the Tiree bards."

During his employment as professor of Gaelic Studies at St. Francis Xavier University in Antigonish, American linguist Kenneth E. Nilsen (1941-2012), whose enthusiasm for the language did much to inspire the ongoing revival of Canadian Gaelic, would take his students every year to visit the grave of Iain mac Ailein at Glen Bard, Antigonish County, Nova Scotia.

== Publication and expurgation ==
In 1856, John Boyd, alias Iain Boide, the founder and editor of the bilingual Antigonish newspaper The Casket, published eleven of Iain mac Ailein's poems in the volume Orain Ghaelach Le Iain Mac Illeathain, Bard Thighearn Chola ("Gaelic Songs by John MacLean, Poet to the Laird of Coll"). Boyd's rendering of the text, according to Robert Dunbar, is much closer to Iain mac Alein's manuscripts than in the highly influential poetry collections edited by his grandson, Presbyterian minister Alexander MacLean Sinclair.

The minister's rendering of the texts have been widely distributed, republished, and viewed as the canonical text. According to Robert Dunbar, however, Sinclair, "took considerable liberties", and his versions often, "differ dramatically", from his grandfather's surviving manuscripts. One of the sole exceptions is Am Gàidheal am-measg nan Gall ("The Gael among the Lowlanders"), for which Iain mac Ailein's manuscript version and published text is "essentially the same", as the poem later published by his grandson. Other poems were deliberately left out of print by Sinclair. Although it survives in manuscript form and was published in John Boyd's collection, Iain mac Ailein's piece of praise poetry about Colin Grant of St. Margaret's Roman Catholic Church in Arisaig was excluded by Sinclair from his edition of his grandfather's collected poems, Clarsach na Coille ("The Harp of the Forest"). Sinclair similarly excluded Iain mac Ailein's Òran do Dhòmhnaill MacArthair ("A Song for Donald MacArthur"), a piece of comic poetry about a Gael from Tiree who travels to the Scottish Lowlands to work with the harvest crews, only to get drunk in Glasgow, robbed of all his earnings, and infected with venereal disease by a prostitute.

Sinclair did confine himself to bowdlerizing his grandfather's poetry. When Iain mac Ailein had emigrated to Nova Scotia in 1819, he carried with him an exceptionally rare early and uncensored edition of Alasdair Mac Mhaighstir Alasdair's groundbreaking 1751 poetry collection, Ais-eridh na Sean Chánoin Albannaich ("The Resurrection of the Old Scottish Language"). In 1915, Sinclair, donated his grandfather's copy of the book to St. Francis Xavier University in Antigonish, Nova Scotia. In a letter to the university's rector, Rev. Hugh P. MacPherson, Sinclair apologized for having razored out everything between pages 152 and 161, but explained that the Gaelic poems printed on the missing pages were, "abominably filthy". These pages had contained two of Alasdair mac Mhaighstir Alasdair's most famous works of erotic poetry; Moladh air Deagh Bhod ("In Praise of a Good Penis") and Tineas na h-Urchaid ("The Venereal Disease").

According to Robert Dunbar, Sinclair's expurgated and heavily rewritten versions of his grandfather's poems were long treated as authoritative and have heavily influenced even the versions collected since from the oral tradition. Dunbar writes, however, that this is perfectly understandable, as people without access to the manuscripts or earlier and more accurate collections would have trusted Sinclair due to his familial connection to the poet. Writing in 2020, however, Dunbar announced that his own corrected edition of Iain mac Ailein's 44 surviving secular poems was shortly to be published by the Scottish Gaelic Texts Society.

== In popular culture ==
Scottish-Canadian poet Watson Kirkconnell published a literary translation of Iain mac Ailein's A’ Choille Ghruamach in the 1948-'49 theme issue of Dalhousie Review under the title, "John MacLean’s Gloomy Forest". The same song has been performed and recorded in the original Gaelic by Mary Jane Lamond, Arthur Cormack, James Graham, and Mary Ann Kennedy.
