= Ailean a' Ridse MacDhòmhnaill =

Scottish-Canadian bard and seanchaidh (1794–1868)

Allan The Ridge MacDonald (1794 Allt an t-Srathain, Lochaber, Scotland – 1 April 1868 Antigonish County, Nova Scotia, Canada) was a bard, traditional singer, and seanchaidh who emigrated from the Gàidhealtachd of Scotland to Nova Scotia in 1816. He continued to compose Gaelic poetry on his two separate homesteads in Canada and remains a significant figure in both Scottish Gaelic literature and in that of Canadian Gaelic. He is also, along with John The Bard MacLean, one of only two 19th-century North American Gaelic poets from whom a sizeable repertoire survives.

== Early life ==
Ailean MacDhòmhnaill was born at Allt an t-Srathan in Lochaber, in 1794. His mother, Mairi ni'n Dòmhnall 'ic Iain Duibh, was a member of Clan Campbell from Ach-a Mhadaidh in Glen Roy. Ailean's father, Alasdair Ruadh mac Aonghas 'ic Alasdair Bhàin, was descended from the tacksmen of Bohuntine. After emigrating to Canada, Alasdair Ruadh MacDhòmhnaill would inherit the mantle of being ceann-taigh ("Chief Representative", "Chief of the Kindred") of the MacDonalds of Bohuntine.

Alasdair Ruadh MacDhòmhnaill (d. 17, June 1831) was a cattle drover who resided at Ach nan Comhaichean, on the south banks of the River Spean. According to tradition, Alasdair Ruadh was also a Gaelic poet of merit. None of his poetic compositions are known to survive.

In his youth, Ailean worked as a shepherd for a local kinsman, Iain Bàn Inse ("Fair John MacDonald of Inch"), whom the poet was later to revile in verse as "fear a dhìobair an càirdeas" ("one who renounced the traditions of kinship") in the poem, Duanag le Ailean Dòmhnallacha bha 'n Achadh-nan Comhaichean air dha miothlachd a ghabhail ri Iain Bàn Ìnnse ("A Song by Allan MacDonald of Ach-nan-Comhaichean when he was displeased with Iain Bàn of Inch").

In his later poem Moladh Albainn Nuaidh ("In Praise of Nova Scotia"), Ailean a' Ridse would later deliver a, "bitter indictment of the working man's lot in Scotland", which has since caused his poem to be compared with the anti-landlord poetry composed by Màiri Mhòr nan Òran decades later to advance the agitation of the Highland Land League.

Until the end of the Napoleonic Wars in 1815, demand for beef was very high and Alasdair Ruadh MacDhòmhnaill, as a cattle drover in Glen Spean, would have been fairly well off compared to other Lochaber Gaels. In addition to the constant threat of eviction by the landlord, the economic downturn that followed the Battle of Waterloo, would have been financially devastating to the MacDhòmhnaill family; particularly as large numbers of demobilized soldiers returned to Lochaber and became their competitors for food, land, and employment. These are believed to have been the reasons why Alasdair Ruadh MacDhòmhnaill decided to bring his whole family to Nova Scotia in 1816.

== Nova Scotia ==
Although no documentation survives regarding which ship they sailed for Nova Scotia on, it is known to have been one of the five emigrant ships from Aberdeen that arrived at the port of Pictou in 1816.

At the age of only 22, Ailean a' Ridse versified the story of his family's voyage to Nova Scotia in his poem, Tighinn do dh' America ("Coming to America"), which he set to the tune, Sàil Beinn Mhic Duibhe. Effie Rankin has called the result, "a remarkable song which resonates with the dynamic energy of sailing ships and stormy seas".

According to an account passed down within the family oral tradition and later written down by Mary A. MacDonald (d. 1951) as "Grandfather's Perilous Adventure", the year after their arrival in Pictou, the MacDonald family hired a shallop to sail them across the Northumberland Strait to Port Hood, Cape Breton. It was passing Arisaig, Nova Scotia on 31 October 1817 when a violent snowstorm blew them off course. Every passenger except Ailean was in the hold. Moments before being swept overboard, Ailean grabbed ahold of a loom and, while holding the loom and gripping his plaid between his teeth, he swam to the shore of Cape Breton. When the other passengers and crew also made it to shore, local people took them in and feasted them with potatoes, herring, and tea.

== The Ridge of Mabou ==
As other Roman Catholic Gaels from Lochaber had been doing since at least 1800, the MacDonald family settled on a homestead upon the Southwest Ridge near Mabou, Nova Scotia (Scottish Gaelic: Màbu, An Drochaid). On, an Ridse ("The Ridge"), from whence their descendants continue to take their name, MacDonald lived for more than thirty years and continued to compose Gaelic poetry.

Like the other MacDonalds of the Ridge, Ailean is said at first to have enjoyed composing Òrain magaidh ("Mocking songs"), or satirical poetry.

The first is Òran Dhòmhnaill Mhòr ("Big Donald's Satire"), which Ailean a' Ridse composed to the air Latha Raon Ruairidh, after a local immigrant from Bornish, South Uist, who was notorious for both his cowardice and physical ugliness, was beaten up in a fight and then went on the run from the police after being charged with swindling a local merchant.

With biting sarcasm, Ailean a' Ridse lampooned both Dòmhnaill Mòr and the cliches and excesses of Scottish clan praise poetry. He called down a curse upon those responsible for the flight of Dòmhnaill Mòr from the police and his resulting absence from Cape Breton. He then pretended to praise Dòmhnaill Mòr, whom he called as courageous as the Jacobite Army during the Battle of Culloden. He mockingly added that neither Cuchulain, William Wallace, Robert the Bruce, The Great Montrose, nor even Fionn Mac Cumhail and his Fianna would ever match Dòmhnaill Mòr in a fight. Ailean then described Dòmhnaill Mòr as a man of great physical attractiveness and who was worshipped and adored by the local women, and who was, "equally comely below the rump".

The second satire poem is aimed at the local population of black bears, whom, as guns were scarce, plundered from the local population with impunity and were according both feared and intensely hated by the pioneer families of Mabou. Ailean a' Ridse is believed to have composed the song Aoir a' Mhathain ("The Bear's Satire"), for which no known tune survives, following an incident at the adjacent homestead of his brother, Dòmhnaill a' Ridse.

One evening, Dòmhnaill witnessed a bear making off with one of his sheep. Despite being armed only with an axe and a firebrand, Dòmhnaill immediately gave chase. He hurled the firebrand at the bear's head and buried his axe blade to its handle in the bear's rump. The bear dropped the sheep and fled, but Dòmhnaill's axe, a priceless tool at the time, was considered lost. Only many months later was the rusted axe found in a pile of animal bones in the forest.

In response, Ailean a' Ridse decided to resort to the magical power attributed to satirical poetry to drive the bears away from the Ridge of Mabou. Modeling the poem that followed upon the well-established "rat satire" tradition in Scottish Gaelic literature, which was believed to drive away other kinds of vermin, Ailean called down a curse upon the bears for their thievery and banished them from Mabou to the United States. He urged the bears to steal everything they could possibly get from the Yankees (Scottish Gaelic: Geancaidh) of New England, "and the ritual crossing of water is invoked to ensure success. Although a great number of bear songs exist throughout Nova Scotia, Òran a' Mhathain appears to surpass them all in sheer vituperative vocabulary".

After he composed such a poem, supernatural music was heard from the nearby forest, which was seen as a bad omen and caused both Ailean and the other MacDonalds of The Ridge to cease composing satirical poetry. This is the reason why only two satires by Ailean a' Ridse are known to survive.

== Antigonish County ==
In 1846, following a series of bad harvests caused by the same blight as the Great Irish and Highland potato famines, Ailean was clearing the land and burning brush when the form of a horse, or riochd eich, briefly became visible in the smoke. As seeing a vision of a horse or headless rider is traditionally regarded in Cape Breton as an omen of an imminent death within the family, Ailean and Catriona MacDonald joined an exodus of local Gaels from Mabou to Antigonish County (Scottish Gaelic: Siorramachd Antaiginis). In return for C£250, Ailean sold their farm to his close friend, kinsman, fellow poet, and protege, Aonghas mac Alasdair, by whom the homestead was ever afterwards termed, Baile Bhàird ("The Farm of the Poet").

Despite his devotion to the Catholic faith, Ailean a' Ridse sharply opposed Bishop William Fraser's decision to institute the Total Abstinence Pledge in the Diocese of Arichat in 1841.

According to Effie Rankin, Ailean a' Ridse saw the Catholic temperance movement, "as something that had its genesis in an alien culture and which was now posing a threat to traditional Gaelic values".

Ailean a' Ridse was far from alone in these attitudes, however, as Effie Rankin continues, "The Temperance Movement was thoroughly detested by most contemporary Gaelic poets. In his Òran dhan Uisge Bheatha, Donald McLellan the Broad Cove blacksmith cites Scriptures when he condemns those who would outlaw whiskey, for Christ Himself created quantities of fine wine at the wedding of Cana; Noah was allowed to celebrate his survival from the Flood, free from the censure of angels and prophets. According to MacLellan, temperance is doubly detestable because it is alien to the Gael".

Ailean a' Ridse composed his 1854 poem Òran dhan Deoch, ("A Song to Drink"), which he set to the air Robai Dona Gòrach, after he found that not a drop of whiskey was available to drink upon Christmas Eve. In the poem, Ailean declared himself a believer in, "The creed of Bacchus". Ailean lamented the loss of merriment caused by the Church's ban against Scottish traditional music and alcohol, while also lamenting the damage that he had seen alcoholism cause in his own family and among many other families like them.

Despite his disagreement with Bishop Fraser over alcohol, the Ailean was rendered heartbroken by the bishop's death in 1851. In response, Ailean a' Ridse composed the poem Cumha do' n Easguig Friseal ("Lament for Bishop Fraser"), which he set to the air A' bliadhna leum dar milleadh. In the poem, Ailean a' Ridse adapted the traditional iconography of a Highland clan mourning the death of their chief to local Catholic Gaels mourning for the death of their bishop.

== Personal life ==
Although no documentation currently survives, it is known that Ailean a' Ridse married Catherine MacPherson, the daughter of Muireach MacPherson of Bohuntine, around 1822 or somewhat earlier. They went on to have seven sons and two daughters, four of whom died young. Their oldest son, Alasdair a' Ridse MacDhòmhnaill, was born on the Ridge of Mabou on 27 February 1823 and went on to become a prolific Canadian Gaelic poet, traditional singer, and seanchaidh in his own right.

== Death ==
According to his family's oral tradition, Ailean a' Ridse composed his last song, Òran do dh' Aonghas mac Alasdair, upon his death bed. During his last illness, Ailean a' Ridse awoke from a dream in which he and his close friend, kinsman, fellow poet, and protege were together singing the Gaelic song, An cluinn thu mis' a charaide? ("Do you hear me my friend?"). In response, Ailean a' Ridse composed a new song set to the same air, which he addressed to Aonghas mac Alasdair. Ailean urged his young friend to continue to keep the traditions of a Highland bard and to pass on the same traditions to the young. Ailean also expressed the hope of seeing his friend again, "before Beltane". This, however, was not to be.

Ailean a' Ridse MacDhòmhnaill died of the palsy on 1 April 1868, at the age of 74. It is said that shortly before his death, he briefly rallied and recited a last poem,

"Ged tha mi fàs nam sheann duine
Gun gabhainn dram is òran!"

"Though I am become an old man,
I can still handle a drink and a song!"

== Legacy ==
"Due to exceptional circumstances", John The Bard MacLean and Allan The Ridge MacDonald are the only 19th century North American Gaelic bards from whom, "sizeable repertoires", still exist. Unlike John The Bard MacLean, however, who both wrote his own poetry down and successfully sought publishers for it, Allan The Ridge MacDonald was well known as a poet and Seanchaidh, "but he was not a compiler of manuscripts". The Gaelic verse of Allan The Ridge was shared by its author only as oral literature and we owe its survival primarily to Canadian Gaelic literary scholar and Presbyterian minister Rev. Alexander MacLean Sinclair (1840–1924), who persuaded Allan's son, Alasdair a' Ridse MacDhòmhnaill, to write down everything he had learned from his father. A phrase that was repeated in the letters and manuscripts of Alasdair a' Ridse was, "Sin mar a' chuala mis' aig m' athair e", ("This is how I heard it from my father").

So much of the traditions of Lochaber and the Gaelic poetry of his father were written down by Alasdair a' Ridse that Raasay-born poet Sorley MacLean was later to comment that Rev. Sinclair, "had no need to come or to write to Scotland, as there was in Nova Scotia a great Seanchaidh, Alexander MacDonald of Ridge".

Allan the Ridge's grandson, Angus The Ridge MacDonald (1866–1951), spent his life on his family homestead and also became a legendary Canadian Gaelic traditional singer and tradition bearer. Beginning in 1937, Angus The Ridge MacDonald's repertoire of Gaelic songs, folklore, and oral literature from Lochaber and Nova Scotia was recorded by John Lorne Campbell, Margaret Fay Shaw, Helen Creighton, Laura Bolton, and MacEdward Leach.
