= Hope Lutheran Church =

Hope Lutheran Church may refer to:

- Hope Lutheran Church (Westcliffe, Colorado), listed on the National Register of Historic Places in Custer County, Colorado
- Hope Lutheran Church (Elgin, North Dakota), listed on the National Register of Historic Places in Grant County, North Dakota
