= Merigomish, Nova Scotia =

Community in Nova Scotia, Canada

Coordinates: 45°37′48″N 62°25′28″W

Merigomish in Nova Scotia

Merigomish is a community in the Canadian province of Nova Scotia, located in Pictou County. Its name derives from a Mi'kmaq word.

The Canadian Gaelic poet Iain mac Ailein's 1826 poem Òran a' Bhàil Ghàidhealaich ("The Song of the Gaelic Ball"), was composed for and first performed at a gathering organized by David Murray at Merigomish and to which only Gaelic speakers were invited. The song remains very popular among Gaelic-speakers in both Scotland and Nova Scotia and is often referred to by its first line, "Bithibh Aotrom 's Togaibh Fonn" ("Be Light-hearted and Raise a Tune").

== See also ==
- St. Paul's Presbyterian Church Merigomish
