= Christmas Island, Nova Scotia =

Community in Nova Scotia, Canada

Coordinates: 45°58′20.32″N 60°44′54.00″W

Christmas Island in Nova Scotia

Christmas Island, Nova Scotia (Scottish Gaelic: Eilean na Nollaig) is a Canadian community of the Cape Breton Regional Municipality on Cape Breton Island, Nova Scotia. It has a post office, a firehall and a very small population. It has a beach with access to the Bras d'Or Lake. A small island just off shore, also named Christmas Island, encloses Christmas Island Pond, a pond that runs into the lake.

== History ==
The original inhabitants of the land, the Miꞌkmaq people, called the area Abadakwichéch, which means "the small reserved portion." Christmas Island received its present name from a Mi'kmaw leader, said to have been a chief named "Noel", which translates from the French as "Christmas", who died and was buried on the island opposite the beach.

The first European settlers in the area arrived in 1802–1804. Angus McNeil, a native of Barra, in Scotland’s Outer Hebrides was one of the first. He was soon followed by other MacNeils from Scotland, attracted by reports of the good agricultural farmland that was available, as well as the nearby fish stocks in the Bras d’Or Lake. By June, 1812, Donald, James, Alexander, Roderick, and John MacNeil were living at Goose Pond, and Hector and John MacDougall, and Donald McNeil were at Christmas Island. Other early settlers were John McKenzie, Hugh Gillis, and Archibald McDougall. John McDonald came from South Uist in 1822 and settled at Rear Christmas Island.

A log Roman Catholic Chapel was under construction by 1814, and completed in 1815. A new church was built in 1823–1824. The new St. Barra Roman Catholic church was consecrated on 22 July 1883, and a League of the Cross Hall was completed in October 1908. In 2015 the Bishop of Antigonish ordered the church closed because of a declining congregation. However, a few parishioners continue to hold services in the church. The Diocese considers them to be trespassers. The parishioners maintain that a nineteenth-century deed names the church's trustees as its rightful owner.

A schoolhouse was in place in Christmas Island by 1875, and in 1918–1919 a new school building was completed.

The Post Office was moved from a neighbouring community to Christmas Island for January 1856.

== Postmark ==
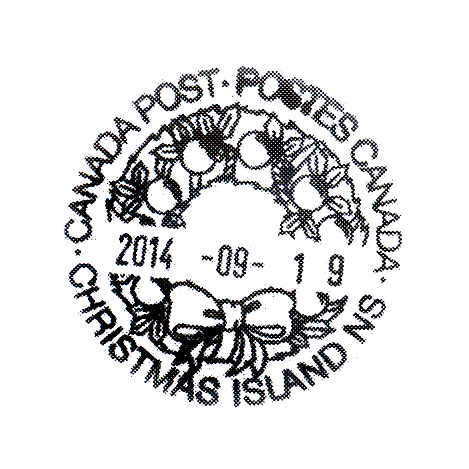
Postmark from Christmas Island

The post office of Christmas Island gets thousands of postcards and packages a day—up to a thousand on the busiest days—during the peak holiday timeframe. These come from around the world during Christmastime so they can be sent on to their destinations with the unique Christmas Island postmark. Greeting cards and packages come from as far as Hong Kong, Seoul, Paris, Mexico City, Sydney, Tahiti and various points across Canada and the United States from collectors and holiday enthusiasts to be franked with the official postmark of Christmas Island. Each year the post office mails out from 12,000 to 14,000 Christmas cards hand-stamped with the special postmark.

The postmark dates back to 1994 when MacKinnon's predecessor, Margaret Rose MacNeil, asked Canada Post to create a postmark named after Christmas Island. Canada Post agreed to the request, creating a postmark with a simple motif with three conifers. It was one of the first pictorial postmarks that Canada Post created.

"Last Christmas and the Christmas before, we had 17,000 Christmas cards," Postmaster Margaret Rose McNeil told (CBC's) King, who noted the rural outlet typically served "a few hundred people."

The current postmark is more ornate, including a wreath laden with decorations and a bow.

To have Christmas Cards or packages stamped with the Christmas Island postmark, address and place the correct postage on the actual greeting card envelope, insert the card or cards into a large envelope and send it to Christmas Island Post Office, 8499 Grand Narrows Highway, Christmas Island, N.S., B1T 1A0.

== Gaelic ==
The Christmas Island fire hall holds the Fèis An Eilein every summer, a Gaelic festival featuring Gaelic music, dancing and culture. It is held in August and includes such things as a milling frolic, square dance, bonfire, bag-piping, step dance, fiddle and piano lessons. As well there is instruction in Gaelic language, folklore and music.

Gaelic is still spoken by a few elderly residents, as many Highland Scots emigrated to Christmas Island during the Highland Clearances.
