= City Hearts =

UK charity

City Hearts is a former charity that housed and helped women with life-controlling issues and victims of human trafficking in the UK. They also ran education programmes in Ghana, Africa. It was an initiative of Hope City Enterprise, a registered charity and the umbrella organisation for the community initiatives of Hope City Church. The head office was located in The Megacentre, Sheffield, with anti-trafficking teams offering support across the UK.

== Ethos and aims ==
The tag line of City Hearts was 'Pursuing Freedom. Restoring Lives'. They aimed to 'relentlessly pursue the freedom and restoration of lives torn apart by Modern Slavery and life controlling issues'.

== History ==
City Hearts was founded by Jenny Gilpin. In 2005 she moved from Brisbane, Australia with her husband Dave Gilpin. In 1991 they had started Hope City Church (previously known as The Hope of Sheffield Christian Church). She aimed to offer support and accommodation for vulnerable women with life-controlling issues, such as eating disorders, alcohol addiction, self-harm, substance misuse, depression and unplanned pregnancy. This was initially a 24/7 Recovery Program. In 2008, the charity began also housing and supporting women who had been rescued from human trafficking.

The first City Hearts Safe House for women was opened in 2010; in 2011, it became part of the UK national provision for helping victims rescued from trafficking. This was followed by a Safe House for men in 2011 and one for families in 2012.

In April 2012, the Recovery Program closed and a smaller, semi-supported unit called 'City Hearts Housing' was opened. This offers accommodation and optional support packages, through the 'Restore Program' to vulnerable women.

In 2013, City Hearts was awarded funding from the Victim Care Fund to pilot a year long Reintegration Support Program (RSP), aimed at supporting ongoing needs of those who have gone through the National Referral Mechanism (NRM).

In 2015, new safe houses were opened across England.

In 2017, it launched a partnership with the British Red Cross to provide emergency support to survivors.

In 2017, the organisation was invited to support victims of child sexual exploitation cases in South Yorkshire. In late 2017, they were invited by South Yorkshire Police to provide victim support for women rescued from suspected 'pop-up brothels' in Sheffield's city centre.

In early 2018, City Hearts presented to a round table meeting at the Houses of Parliament to seek to engage businesses in supporting survivors of modern slavery with an employment opportunity. Also in 2018, The Co-operative Group in partnership with City Hearts, pledged to create and fill 300 jobs for survivors of modern slavery.

As part of the National Referral Mechanism, City Hearts Anti-trafficking operated within a six-week time frame to offer immediate support, medical care, counselling and assistance toward a new future. City Hearts was sub contracted by The Salvation Army, who have the contract from the Ministry of Justice, to manage the support given to victims of trafficking, which covers the region of England, Wales and is for both men and women. They also worked closely with the police, Social Services, the UK Human Trafficking Centre (UKHTC) and other national agencies. In August 2011, City Hearts won the Divisional Commander's Award in recognition of outstanding work in connection with 'Operational Pantin'.

City Hearts 'Restore' Program presented six streams of optional support covering life skills, health and well-being, recovery, personal development, social development and spiritual development. Women also have access to weekly psychotherapy or counselling sessions. City Hearts Housing offered women a furnished single bedroom with support workers available over night. They provided a weekly program of optional events and an emergency on-call facility. A client story of recovery from longterm eating disorder was featured in the Sheffield Start in February 2019.

City Hearts Africa was launched in Accra, Ghana in 2012. This began with running a homework club and educational academy, aimed at giving vulnerable children a safe place to study and the motivation to stay in education.

In February 2019, City Hearts launched in the Netherlands providing practical support and language cafes for vulnerable women.

== Controversy ==
In March, 2018, a Channel 4 News report into City Hearts suggested they were controlling towards vulnerable clients and 'uncovered allegations that untrained staff were left in charge of victims of trafficking and abuse.' It highlighted interviews with 'around 40 people who were cared for or worked for the City Hearts charity in Sheffield' who spoke of 'their concerns and claims of homophobia.' Individuals described on camera being coerced to disclose their abuse history on stage in front of the church congregation to pass the programme, or being told that being gay was the work of the devil, whilst a staff member described being unqualified and untrained, and told to respond to serious incidents including self-harm with suggestions of prayer and scripture. The Home Office and Charity Commission stated that the allegations were "deeply distressing" and were in the process of investigating.

City Hearts split from Hope City Church and became legally independent in March 2020. They then shared no premises, and retained no practical, legal, financial or influential connections with them.

Since 2015, City Hearts has had its own distinct Board of Trustees, externally judged to be independent-thinking professionals with specialist experience relevant to the charity. None of City Heart's Board of Trustees had any links to Hope City Church.
