= Hope Lutheran Church (Westcliffe, Colorado) =

Historic church in Colorado, United States

- U.S. National Register of Historic Places
- Colorado State Register of Historic Properties
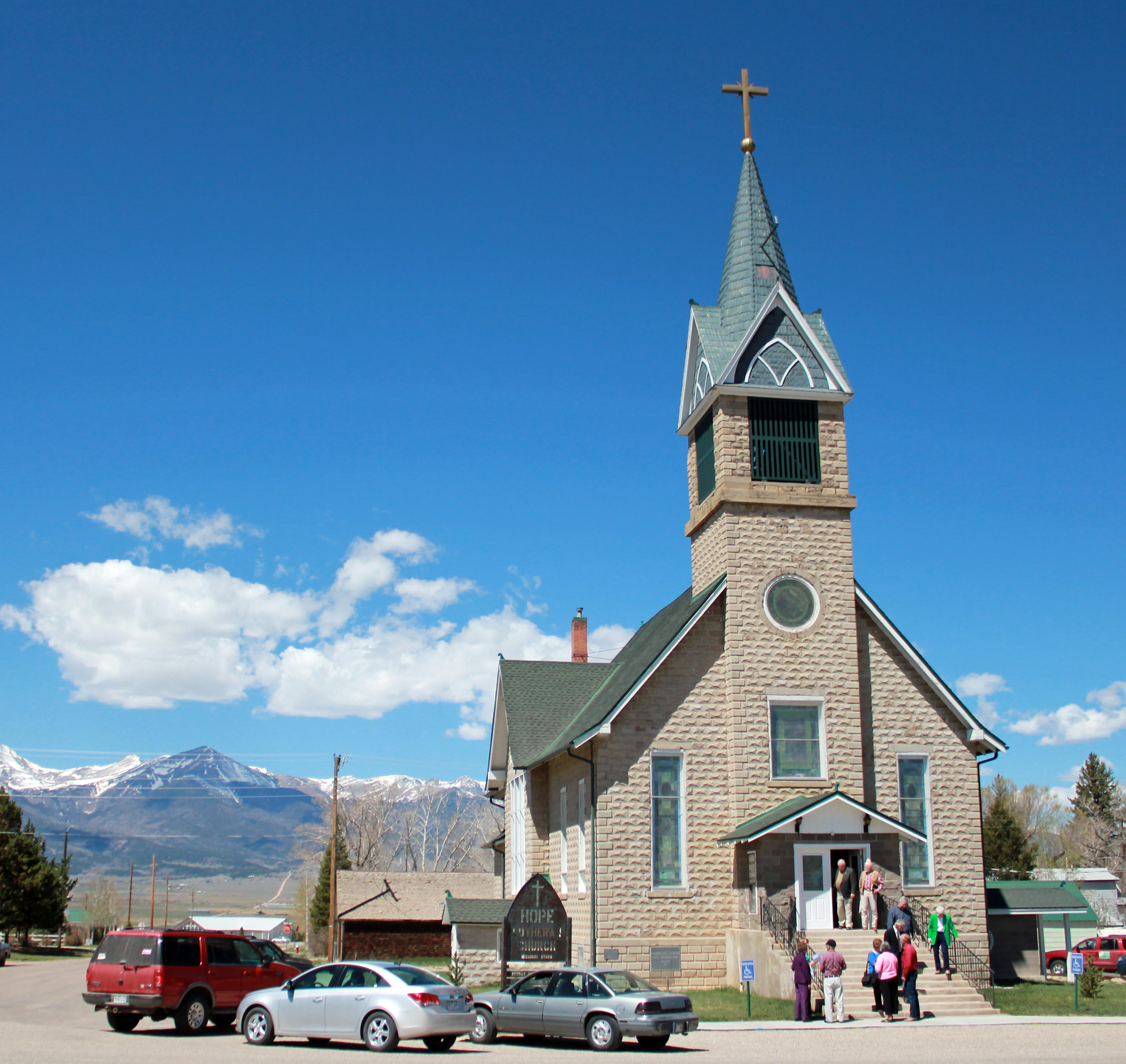

- Location within Colorado Location within the United States
- Location: 310 S. 3rd St., Westcliffe, Colorado
- Coordinates: 38°7′57″N 105°28′2″W
- Area: less than one acre
- Built: 1917
- Architect: Reininga, Rev. John
- NRHP reference No.: 78000838
- CSRHP No.: 5CR.55
- Added to NRHP: January 31, 1978

The Hope Lutheran Church is a historic church at 310 S. 3rd Street in Westcliffe, Colorado. The building was designed and constructed in 1917 by Reverend John Reininga and was listed on the National Register of Historic Places in 1978.

It is a rectangular 35 by 75 feet (11 m × 23 m) church with a 96 feet (29 m) tall tower which is visible for miles. It is built of hand-made concrete blocks, and the only ornamentation is brick quoins on the corners.
