= St. Paul's Presbyterian Church Merigomish =

Presbyterian church Merigomish, Nova Scotia, Canada

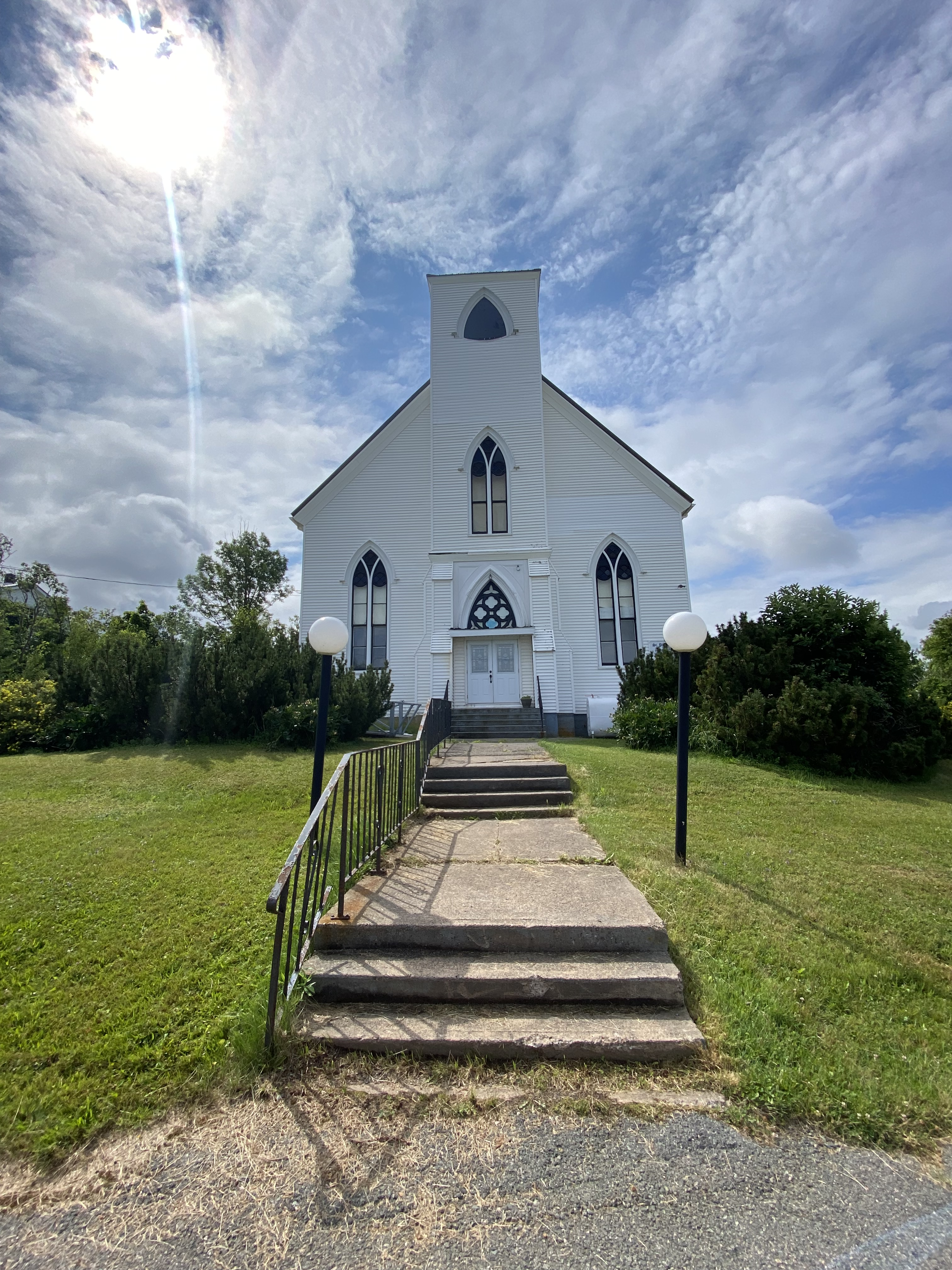
- Location: Merigomish, Nova Scotia
- Country: Canada
- Denomination: Presbyterian

History
- Status: Church
- Founded: December 1789; 236 years ago

Architecture
- Functional status: Active
- Groundbreaking: 1868

St. Paul's Presbyterian Church is a Presbyterian congregation located in the community of Merigomish, Nova Scotia, Canada.

== Early history ==
St. Paul's Presbyterian Church in Merigomish was founded in 1789 by United Empire Loyalists of Highland Scots descent, with many residents arriving on The Hector in 1773, in Pictou, Nova Scotia.

== Growth and expansion ==
At a meeting on February 10th 1868, it was decided by the congregation that a church building be erected on the site and that it be completed by November of the following year. In May 1868, the size and location of the new church were decided. In June 1868, the foundations were laid. Work was completed the following year at a cost of $4608. The dedication of the new building took place on November 20th, 1869. An archival image of St. Paul's shows that the building used to have a steeple, however it has since been removed.

In 1966, it was decided that a new church hall be constructed under the church. Work commenced in July 1968 and was completed the same year. The hall was dedicated on May 25th, 1969.

== Ministers of St. Paul's ==
- 2010–Present Rev. Bonnie Wynn
