= An Solus Iùil =

Gaelic-language Nova Scotian newspaper (1925–1927)

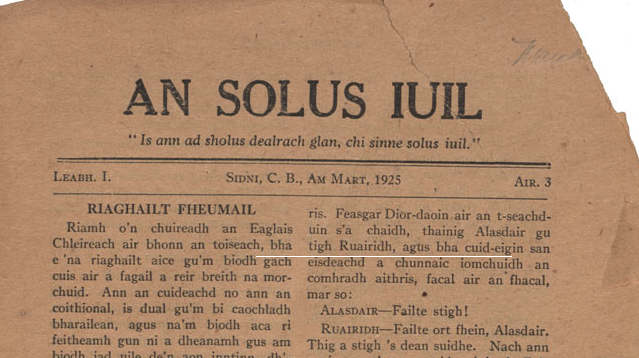
- Type: Monthly
- Founded: 1925
- Ceased publication: 1927
- Language: Scottish Gaelic
- City: Sydney, Nova Scotia, Canada

An Solus Iùil (lit. 'The Guiding Light') was a Scottish Gaelic-language religious newspaper published in the mid-1920s in Sydney, Nova Scotia, on Cape Breton Island. The paper's slogan, "Is ann ad sholus dealrach glan, chì sinne solus iùil", comes from Psalms 36:9 and translates into English as 'In a pure shining light, we will see a guiding light'.

When An Solus Iùil launched in 1925, it intended to publish monthly, but after a few months the paper's publication became less frequent. The final issue was published in 1927. Each issue was just eight-pages long and included no advertising, but was apparently supported by the United Church of Canada. It provided significant coverage of church-related news, including ministerial appointments and church meetings. Details of its ownership and editor were not made clear in the paper; the March 1925 issue indicated it was published by authority of the Church Union Council of the Presbyterian Church in Canada, but later issues lacked any such notice.

Among the content published in An Solus Iùil were several còmhraidhean (lit. 'conversations'), a distinctive 19th-century Gaelic literary device similar to Socratic dialogues. Unlike the còmhraidhean that appeared in other Gaelic-language publications in Nova Scotia, at least two of the An Solus Iùil còmhradhean were clearly written by a Canadian author, not reprints of previous Scottish còmhraidhean, and focused on the creation of the United Church and emigration away from Nova Scotia.
