= Hope Lutheran Church (Elgin, North Dakota) =

Historic church in North Dakota, United States

- U.S. National Register of Historic Places
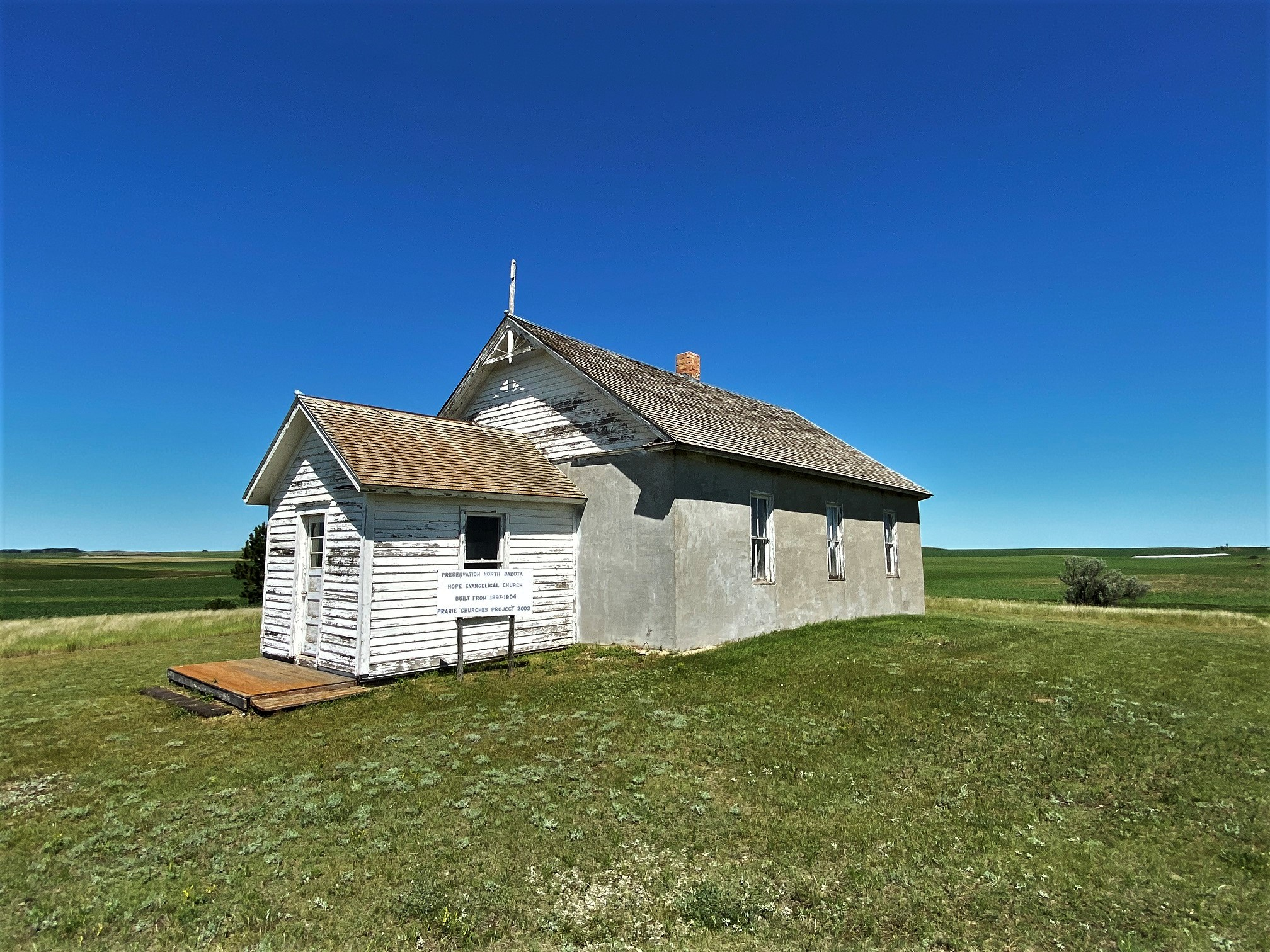

- Location within North Dakota Location within the United States
- Nearest city: Elgin, North Dakota
- Coordinates: 46°30′2″N 101°51′41″W
- Area: 2.5 acres (1.0 ha)
- Built: 1898
- NRHP reference No.: 91001924
- Added to NRHP: January 16, 1992

The Hope Lutheran Church, also known as Old Stone Church, is a historic church built in approximately 1898 and located seven miles north of Elgin, North Dakota. It was listed on the National Register of Historic Places (NRHP) in 1992. The 2.5-acre (1.0 ha) area of the NRHP listing includes a cemetery as an additional contributing site.

The church is located on a hill above the cemetery. The exterior walls were constructed with local sandstone slabs laid in mud mortar. In 1981, the sandstone was covered with a cement material that gives the exterior the appearance of stucco. In a chapter on the prairie churches of North Dakota, the authors of "Frommer's 500 Places to See Before They Disappear" describe Hope Lutheran as an "evocative sight ... standing alone among the wheat fields" with no steeple, and "only a plain white cross tacked onto its cedar-shingled roof."

According to the church's NRHP nomination, "This church is the only known Catholic church in existence that reflects the German Russian architectural heritage of sandstone and plaster wall construction." According to church records, the church was built by 12 families from the Beresan district of South Russia, specifically from Kulm, Leipzig, Petersthal, Tarutino, and Teplitz; these locations are villages in the Bessarabia area of what is now Ukraine. They would have arrived into the area by rail to Menno or Scotland, South Dakota. The parish ceased operation in 1956, and the interior furnishings and entry vestibule were sold and removed at that time.
