= Mac-Talla =

Scottish Gaelic periodical

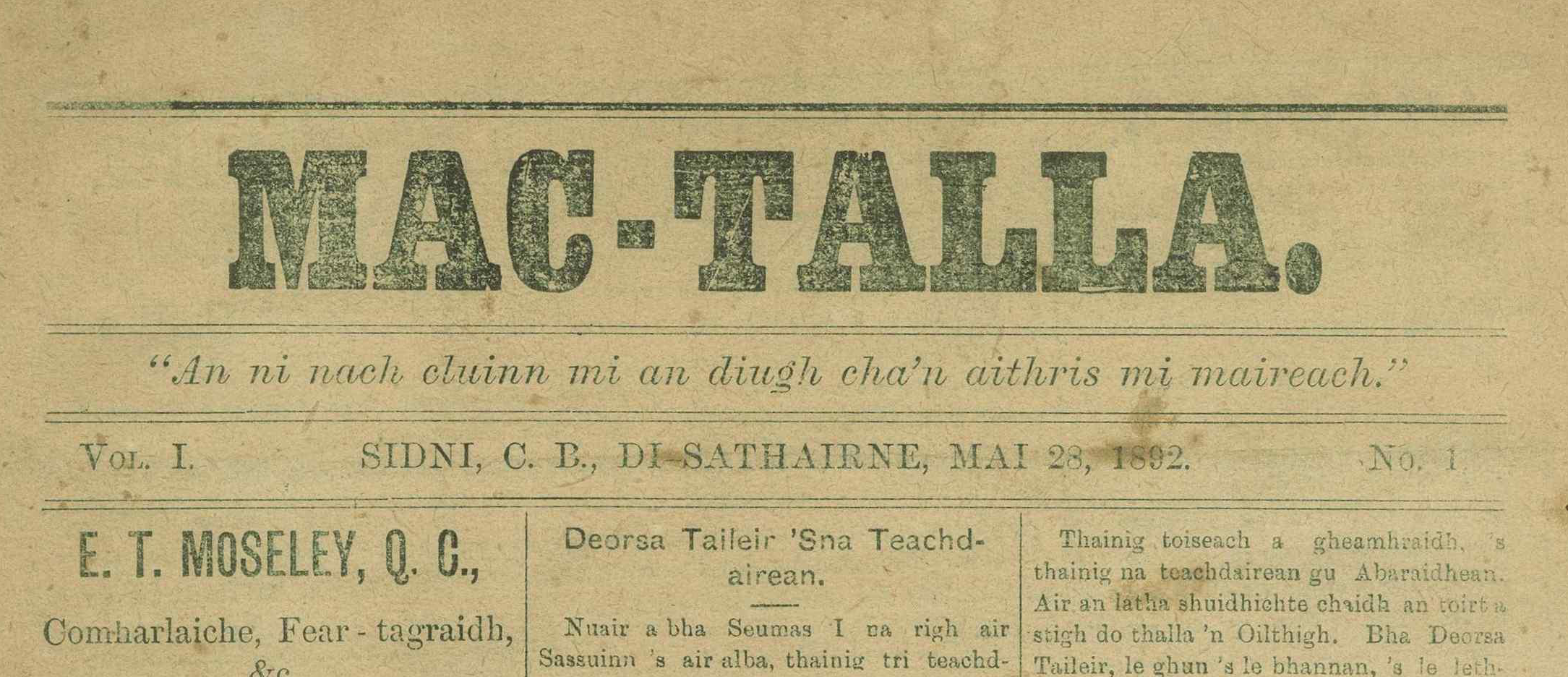
Masthead of the first issue of Mac-Talla, published May 28, 1892

Mac-Talla (The Echo) was a Scottish Gaelic periodical published by Jonathon G. MacKinnon (1869–1944) out of Sydney, Nova Scotia, Canada. It ran 12 volumes between 1892 and 1904. Its first issue was published May 28, 1892 and its final issue was published June 24, 1904. For its first nine years, the paper was published weekly, but in 1901 it shifted to a bi-weekly publishing schedule. Its circulation reached more than 1,500 readers, primarily in Gaelic-speaking communities in Canada, but with subscribers in Australia, New Zealand, and Scotland.

The entire collection of this periodical is available online through the Sabhal Mòr Ostaig website.

The Scotsman has referred to it as "[t]he most successful Gaelic newspaper ever".
