= Hope Church (Belo Horizonte) =

- Classification: Protestant
- Orientation: Continental Reformed church and continuationism
- Governance: Presbyterian
- Region: Brazil
- Founder: Guilherme de Carvalho
- Origin: September 19, 2008; Belo Horizonte
- Official website: igrejaesperanca.org.br

The Hope Church (Portuguese: Igreja Esperança) is a Protestant oriented reformed and continuationism. It was founded on September 19, 2008, by pastor Guilherme de Carvalho.

The denomination is known for the political comments of its founding pastor, Guilherme de Carvalho, who was Director of Promotion and Education in Human Rights, at the Ministry of Women, Family and Human Rights, at the Presidency of Jair Bolsonaro, but promoted criticism of government management in the COVID-19 pandemic. During the COVID-19 pandemic, the pastor championed social distance and closed a church during Christmas 2020.

The church also stands out for its theological uniqueness. It subscribes to the Belgic Confession, traditional confession of the Dutch Continental Reformed church, as well as the Apostles' Creed. Silently defends the doctrine continuationism as far as the charismatic gifts, mainly when at the criterion in contemporary prophecies.
