= Hope City Church =

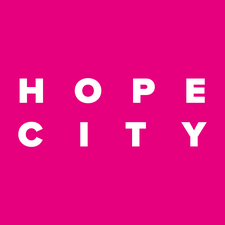
- Location: International
- Denomination: C3 Church; Pentecostalism, Evangelical, Charismatic
- Website: www.hopecity.church

History
- Founded: 1991
- Founder(s): Dave Gilpin and Jenny Gilpin

Hope City Church (formerly a Multisite Church until 2021) is a charity consisting of 6 autonomous UK churches based in the United Kingdom. It was launched in Sheffield in 1991 by Dave and Jenny Gilpin who left Australia after viewing the Hillsborough Disaster in Sheffield.

== History ==
Hope City Church was founded in Sheffield in 1991 by Dave and Jenny Gilpin, who had been a part of an Assemblies of God church in Brisbane, Australia. After seeing the Hillsborough disaster in 1989 on television in Australia Dave and Jenny went to investigate the possibilities of starting churches in the UK. After a three-week speaking tour of small churches across England in December 1990, they returned at Easter 1991 to pioneer the church, which was first called The Hope of Sheffield Christian Church. It has been described as "a church that was born out of tragedy – and a church, which is based around one crucial four-letter word: hope." The Church was once noticed when it undertook a big advertising campaign, which included the use of large billboards and the sides of buses to promote the organisation and assert that it was not a "traditional" church.

Hope City has also planted churches in Liverpool, beginning in historic venues such as the Black-E and Epstein Theatre. It has planted in Leeds, Newcastle, Sunderland, Birmingham, Lancashire and in Accra, Ghana, Frankfurt, Germany, Darmstadt, Germany, Kuala Lumpur, Malaysia, London, and its most recent location York. They now have 3,000 members in 11 locations. The Church has also used venues such as clubs like 'Tiger Tiger' in Newcastle as well as St James' Park.

Hope City has been linked to the movement of evangelical-style churches in Australia, most successful being Hillsong Church.

In 2010, an additional church was established in Accra. In 2012, a new Hope City Church in Frankfurt, Germany was established.

In 2020, the Senior Pastors of the church resigned due to allegations of racism. After which the locations of Hope City Church became autonomous churches under their own local leadership. In a statement sent out to the church in January 2021 the Trustees stated that, "It is our intention that from Easter 2021, Hope City Church, which up until now has been one church in multiple locations within the C3 movement, will become a family of churches within the C3 movement." Each church remains under the governance of the Trustees of Hope City Church.

== Facilities ==
The church bought an old tool factory in 1998 in the United Kingdom and called it The Megacentre. The building contains a play centre, a nursery and conferencing facilities.

In 2009, Hope City Church bought the former Archive building of Leeds central library on York Road which has been converted to contain a 400-seater auditorium and community and conferencing facility for Leeds. In 2018, the Leeds building was sold to a developer who plans to convert the space into 52 apartments. The Leeds congregation have since relocated their services to meeting in a city centre hotel.

== Organisation ==
=== Leadership ===
Founders Dave and Jenny Gilpin were the senior pastors of Hope City Church until their resignation in June 2020. Hope City Church is governed by a board of trustees.

=== Ministries ===
Hope City's ministries included: Whizz Kids, She Is, Hope City Sons, Creative, This New Republic, Whitefields Leadership College, as well as Project 180.

==== Community ====
In 2002, Hope City Church started a Night of Honour in Sheffield, which concluded in 2012. The event celebrated community heroes, children and community service. The church also ran other community projects out of The Megacentre.

==== Young Adults ====
The Church hosted 'Young Adult' nights for their 18-30's age group across their locations, with 'This New Republic' Conference taking place annually.

==== Creative ====
The church produced shows for both the annual Night of Honour and their 20th Anniversary celebration, both at the Sheffield City Hall.

==== Waverley Development ====
In 2018, Hope City Church joined a steering group responsible for designing a brand new country park on the Waverley development in Rotherham. The group is part of the 'Well North' project funded by Public Health England and is part of Hope City Church's plans to relocate to the Waverley area and build a 1500-seater facility. A £10million project that aims to deliver a wide range of benefits for the Sheffield City region. More than 600 houses have been completed at Waverley and about 3,400 are set to be added over the next 15 years. Plans for the development also include a £50 million town centre featuring a town square, bus station, hotel, shops, a gym, health centre, pharmacy, offices and parking for 577 cars. The leisure, business and retail scheme could create 700 jobs. This project is no longer going ahead.

==== City Hearts charity ====
City Hearts is a charity that houses and helps both women with life controlling issues and victims of human trafficking in the UK, and runs education programmes in Ghana, Africa. City Hearts (UK) was set up by Hope City Church but became financially and legally separate in the summer of 2020.

== Criticism and controversy ==
=== Hope City Church and City Hearts ===
In March, 2018, a Channel 4 News report into City Hearts, a charity founded by Hope City Church, 'uncovered allegations that untrained staff were left in charge of victims of trafficking and abuse.' It highlighted interviews with 'around 40 people who were cared for or worked for the City Hearts charity in Sheffield' who spoke of 'their concerns and claims of homophobia.' Individuals described on camera being coerced to disclose their abuse history on stage in front of the church congregation to pass the programme, or being told that being gay was the work of the devil, whilst a staff member described being unqualified and untrained, and told to respond to serious incidents including self-harm with suggestions of prayer and scripture.

Following the report, City Hearts appointed an independent investigator to conduct a review of the allegations which was submitted to the Charity Commission who opened a regulatory compliance case to assess governance and safeguarding at the charity. In November 2019, the Charity Commission issued a statement to conclude that "the allegations raised, whilst significant and concerning, were historic dating to 2011-2012 and there were no live risks; and the charity had acted appropriately in relation to the allegations by instructing a thorough independent investigation, reviewing their systems and putting in place their own action plan to address outstanding recommendations of the investigation." A full version of the report is available online to read as well as the response by City Hearts CEO.

City Hearts (UK) became financially and legally separate in the summer of 2020.

Hope City Church has been criticised for promoting the prosperity gospel; suggesting members should make sizable and recurrent offerings in addition to the tithe in return for financial breakthrough and blessings.

=== Racism Allegations ===
In June 2020, Dave and Jenny Gilpin resigned from their roles as senior leaders after Dave Glipin posted an apology to a black member of the church on Instagram admitting he tried to appeal to white people, saying "I have always had a vision of creating a diverse, multicultural church," he said. "Because we were getting, for a period of time, fewer white people attending in Sheffield I tried to make the church more appealing to what I thought white people wanted. I realised in the past week that this is completely racist, that I have contributed and added to generations and centuries of racism over the earth and I've hurt many people - both in the past and in the present and I am deeply sorry.". The incident was reported on BBC news and the Sunday Times, which stated that "Hope City tries hard to attract young people, broadcasting its music-led services on YouTube, promoting slick social media pages and hosting frequent networking events. But, whistleblowers said the image hid a "toxic" culture and accused the Gilpins of pursuing an "evil agenda"."

=== Negative Leadership Culture ===
The report assembled following the lead pastors' resignation also delved into the wider problems in the church's leadership culture. It pointed to, amongst other things, a lack of oversight, the lead pastor's overbearing style, a clique culture amongst those in the various churches' core teams, selective raising of younger leaders that would comply with authority without questioning it, the discouragement of raising concerns, which lead in part to the incidents of a racial nature listed above. Attention was also raised to the ongoing pressure placed on members to give to offerings, alongside a "lack of transparency" in finances, which "led to an "erosion of trust" among some members."
