= The Casket =

Canadian newspaper in Nova Scotia

- Type: Weekly newspaper
- Format: Tabloid
- Owner: SaltWire Network
- Founded: 1852
- Language: English
- Headquarters: Antigonish, Nova Scotia
- Circulation: 4101
- Website: thecaskket.ca

The Casket is a weekly newspaper published in Antigonish, Nova Scotia, Canada, by SaltWire Network.

== History ==
First published on June 24, 1852, by John Boyd, the paper was eventually acquired by Casket Printing and Publishing Company. A descendant and local lawyer, Christopher Boyd, has written on legal issues for the paper.

Brace Publishing Limited, a division of the Halifax newspaper The Chronicle Herald, acquired the newspaper in 2012 before being subsumed into the Chronicle Herald's expanded SaltWire Network in 2017.

Staff have included the noted cartoonist Bruce MacKinnon, who worked for the paper as a youth.
