= Aois-dàna =

Scottish Gaelic or Old Irish "people of the arts" until the late 17th century

The aois-dàna (Scottish Gaelic, literally 'people of the arts', often translated as 'bards') served as advisers to nobles and chiefs of clans throughout the Scottish Gàidhealtachd until the late 17th century. Many of them specialised in preserving the genealogy of families and recited family trees at the succession of chieftains.

The aois-dàna were held in high esteem throughout the Scottish Highlands. As late as the end of the 17th century, they sat in the sreath or circle among the nobles and chiefs of families. They took the preference of the ollamh or doctor in medicine. After the extinction of the druids, they were brought in to preserve the genealogy of families, and to repeat genealogical traditions at the succession of every chieftain. They had great influence over all the powerful men of the time. Their persons, their houses, their villages, were sacred. Whatever they asked was given them — not always, however, out of respect, but from fear of their satire, which frequently followed a denial of their requests. They lost by degrees, through their own insolence and importunity, all the respect their order had so long enjoyed, and consequently all their wonted profits and privileges. The Lord Lyon of Scotland may well have his roots in something parallel.

Martin Martin says of them:

They shut their doors and windows for a day’s time, and lay in the dark with a stone upon their belly, and their plaids about their heads and eyes, and thus they pumped their brains for rhetorical encomiums.

Among the ancient Brythons there were, according to Jones, an order of bard called the Arwyddwardd, i.e. the ensign bard or herald at arms, who employed himself in genealogy, and in blazoning the arms of princes and nobles, as well as altering them according to their dignity or deserts.

== Irish ==
The equivalent Irish terms are áes dána (Old Irish) and aos dána (modern). Aosdána is currently used in Ireland as the name of an exclusive organisation of artists and writers founded in the late 20th century.

== See also ==
- Bard
- Seanchaí, Irish storyteller
