= Victoria Junction, Nova Scotia =

Community in Nova Scotia, Canada

Coordinates: 46°9′56″N 60°7′12″W

Victoria Junction in Nova Scotia

Victoria Junction is a community in the Canadian province of Nova Scotia, located in the Cape Breton Regional Municipality.

It is located approximately 3 km (1.9 mi) east of Sydney on the east side of Grand Lake.

== Railway history ==
The community developed as a result of a railway junction established in the 1870s by two different coal mining companies. The Victoria Company built a railway from its coal mines on the exposed coastline at New Victoria north of Grand Lake to a wharf on the more sheltered waters of Sydney Harbour at what was named Victoria Pier. The International Company built a railway from its coal mines in the Bridgeport district of Glace Bay east of Grand Lake to a wharf on Sydney Harbour adjacent to the Victoria Company's Victoria Pier; the International Company's wharf was called the International Pier and its rail line paralleled the Victoria Company's rail line between Grand Lake and Sydney Harbour.

On 1 February 1893 all of the various independent coal companies on the south side of Sydney Harbour were merged to form the Dominion Coal Company (DOMCO). In 1894 DOMCO began rationalizing duplicate trackage amongst its rail lines, beginning with the former Victoria and International companies' tracks between Grand Lake and Sydney Harbour. DOMCO rail lines were eventually organized into what became known as the Sydney and Louisburg Railway (S&L) and Victoria Junction continued to exist as a railway junction between the branch line to New Victoria and New Waterford from the S&L's mainline between Sydney and Glace Bay and Louisbourg.

In 1968 the coal and railway assets of the S&L's parent company Dominion Steel and Coal Corporation (DOSCO) were nationalized by the Government of Canada and were placed in the control of a federal Crown corporation called Cape Breton Development Corporation (DEVCO). The newly formed Devco Railway continued similar operations on the former S&L rail lines. In the 1970s new coal mines and the Lingan Generating Station were opened east of New Waterford in Lingan resulting in a dramatic increase in rail traffic on the New Waterford branch. At the same time DEVCO also constructed a large coal preparation plant at Victoria Junction where coal was transported by trains from various DEVCO mines in the Glace Bay and New Waterford areas, then graded and mixed and stored before being transported to electrical generating stations. Railway operations east of Glace Bay to Louisbourg were abandoned by the 1980s. DEVCO constructed an integrated railway locomotive shop and rail car repair complex at Victoria Junction which opened on 10 June 1983; the facility was called the Devco Transportation Centre. The opening of the Victoria Junction shops resulted in the closure and demolition of the former S & L shops in downtown Glace Bay; this site is now an undeveloped brownfield site bordered by Official Row and Union Street.

In November 2001 DEVCO ceased coal mining and the following month sold the Devco Railway's assets to a subsidiary of Emera, the holding company for Nova Scotia Power; Emera has contracted operation of the rail assets to the Sydney Coal Railway (SCR) which operates trains from the International Piers to the Lingan Generating Station. The former main line east of Victoria Junction to Glace Bay has been abandoned since the early 2000s, thus Victoria Junction is no longer a true railway junction and is instead the midpoint of the SCR's line between Sydney Harbour and Lingan.
