= Industrial Cape Breton =

Geographic region in Nova Scotia, Canada

Industrial Cape Breton is a geographic region in the Canadian province of Nova Scotia. It refers to the eastern portion of Cape Breton County fronting the Atlantic Ocean on the southeastern part of Cape Breton Island.

== Geography ==
The area comprising Industrial Cape Breton includes the following communities within the Cape Breton Regional Municipality and earned its name from the various industrial activities relating to steelmaking, heavy water production, coal mining, and spin-off industries.

=== Northside ===
Referring to the north side of Sydney Harbour.

- northeastern tip of Boularderie Island at Point Aconi
- Bras d'Or
- Florence
- Sydney Mines
- North Sydney

=== Southside ===
- Sydney
- New Victoria
- South Bar
- New Waterford
- Lingan
- Dominion
- Glace Bay
- Reserve Mines
- Donkin
- Louisbourg
- Port Morien
- Broughton

== History ==
=== Early mining ===
The southeastern part of Cape Breton Island is home to the Sydney Coal Field, an extensive underground coal seam extending at an angle from the shore beneath the seafloor of the Cabot Strait. This large deposit of high-sulphur coal was first extracted by French soldiers from Fortress of Louisbourg in 1720 at nearby Port Morien. A major coal industry developed during the 19th century, becoming the largest energy project in British North America at its height of production. The largest integrated steel mill in the British Commonwealth was constructed on Sydney Harbor in 1901.

The coal and steel industries went into decline following World War II and never fully recovered. They were nationalized by the federal and provincial governments during the late 1960s with the intention of closing them by the 1980s, however production increased in the 1970s as a result of rising world oil and steel prices. By the 1990s, environmental degradation (see Sydney Tar Ponds) and economic ruin were facing the industrial Cape Breton region. The steel mill and last coal mine were closed in 2001 and the area has been struggling to adapt.

While the urban area of eastern Cape Breton County influenced by the coal and steel industries came to be referred to as "Industrial Cape Breton", many rural communities in the rest of Cape Breton Island have been relatively stable economically, largely due to the mix of fishing, forestry, small-scale agriculture, and a growing tourism industry as a result of the spectacular scenery found throughout the island.

=== General Mining Association ===
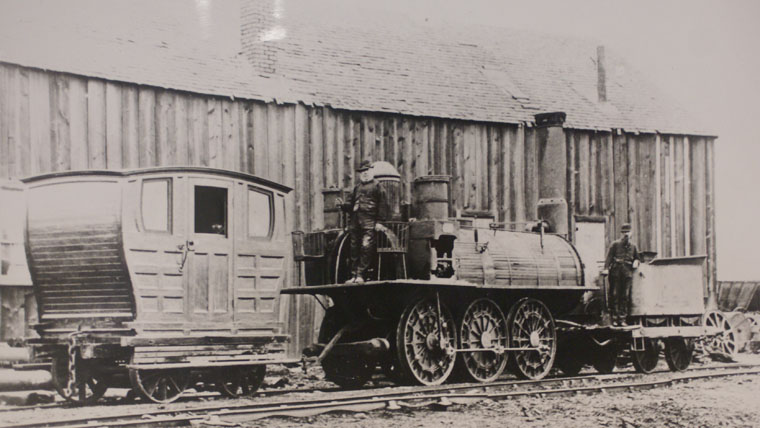
General Mining Association's steam locomotive 'Samson' at Albion Mines, Pictou County. The locomotive was built by Timothy Hackworth of Shildon, County Durham, UK and went into service on the first part of the new railway in 1839.

In 1826 all mining rights in Nova Scotia were transferred from the Duke of York to a monopoly named the General Mining Association. The GMA developed some mines in the Eastern Cape Breton but mostly concentrated on the mainland part of Nova Scotia. In 1858, the GMA's monopoly was broken and many American-financed mining companies were developed in the area, particularly in Glace Bay, New Waterford, Sydney Mines and surrounding areas.

=== SCOTIA and DOMCO ===
In the 1890s, two large conglomerates were formed; the Dominion Coal Company (DOMCO) merged all the mines on the south side of Sydney Harbour and built the Sydney & Louisburg Railway with its headquarters in Glace Bay, to transport coal from the mines to the ports at Sydney and Louisbourg. At its high point, the Dominion Coal Company operated eleven mines in the town of Glace Bay which were responsible for forty percent of Canada's coal production. The GMA was transformed into Nova Scotia Steel and Coal Company (SCOTIA) and developed mines on the north side of Sydney Harbour. In 1899, DOMCO financed the construction of a large integrated steel mill in Sydney's Whitney Pier neighbourhood, which was named Dominion Iron and Steel Company (DISCO); the DISCO mill smelted iron ore mined in Bell Island, Newfoundland. SCOTIA also built a steel mill in Sydney Mines. The booming economy in the Industrial area experienced immigration from Newfoundland and Eastern Europe to fuel the labour demand.

=== BESCO ===
In 1914 the SCOTIA steel mill was closed and in 1920 both DOMCO/DISCO and SCOTIA were merged into a new company named British Empire Steel and Coal Company (BESCO).

The copyright of this section might be in question and is likely from UMWA material.

IN MARCH OF 1925, Cape Breton coal miners were receiving $3.65 in daily wages and had been working part-time for more than three years. They burned company coal to heat company houses illuminated by company electricity. Their families drank company water, were indebted to the company "Pluck Me" store and were financially destitute as evidenced by the company "Bob Tailed Sheet". Local clergy spoke of children clothed in flour sacks and dying of starvation from the infamous "four cent meal". The miners had fought continuously since 1909 for decent working conditions, an eight hour day and a living wage.

The British Empire Steel Corporation (BESCO) was controlled by President Roy M. Wolvin and Vice-President J.E. McClurg who defended these conditions by frankly stating,

coal must be produced cheaper in Cape Breton, poor market conditions and increasing competition male this an absolute necessity. If the miners require more work, then the United Mine Workers of America district 26 Executive must recommend wage reduction

The stage had been set for a sequence of events which would lead to the tragic death of a union brother and father of 10 children, William Davis.

In the early days of March 1925, J.E. McClurg added insult to injury by eliminating credit for miners at the company "Pluck Me" store and further reducing days of work at the collieries. On March 6, 1925, U.M.W.A. strategist, J. B. McLachlan, left with few options, called for the removal of all maintenance men from the collieries; a 100% strike was necessary to do battle with BESCO. If the company would not negotiate an end to this deprivation and hunger the mines would slowly fill with floodwater and die. The company response from Vice President J.E. McLurg (Besco) was brief and derogatory:

We hold all the cards ... they (the miners) will have to come to us ... they can't stand the gaff.

This became a catch phrase for the miners and made the workers even more determined than ever to prove to McLurg and others that they could indeed, "stand the gaff."

The next two cold winter months were filled with grief and hardship; BESCO cut off the sale of coal to miners houses and mounted a vigorous, public relations campaign to blame the miners for their own predicament. Hard pressed merchants continued to give credit, fishermen contributed their catch, the British Canadian Co-operatives donated 500 dollars. In Boston expatriate Maritimers formed a Cape Breton Relief Committee. This time, sympathy and support seemed to be on the side of the miners and their families. The Company and their government friends would soon see the result of this support.

The U.M.W.A. lobbied for intervention from the Liberal Provincial and Federal Governments to no avail; this prompted the unions most difficult decision to date. On June 3, 1925, the U.M.W.A. withdrew the last maintenance men from BESCO's power plant at Waterford Lake. In retaliation, the company cut off electricity and water to the town of New Waterford which included the town hospital filled with extremely sick children. For more than a week the town mayor, P.G. Muise, literally begged company officials to restore electricity and water to his townspeople—BESCO ignored his requests. On June 11, 1925 drunken company police terrorized the people of New Waterford by charging down Plummer Avenue on horseback beating all who stood in their path. They rode through the school yards, knocking down innocent children while joking that the miners were at home hiding under their beds. It was the last straw.

At 10:00 a.m. in New Waterford, the U.M.W.A. was organizing an army of angry miners. They were determined to restore electricity and water to their homes and families; On June 11 approximately 3,000 infuriated men and boys gathered at New Waterford and made their way towards the power plant. They marched on Waterford Lake power plant and were met by a wall of more than 100 armed company thugs and police on horseback, and the battle of Waterford Lake took place. Police were hauled off horseback and beaten, while others jumped in New Waterford Lake and swam to the other side. Before the miners could state their demands, the riders charged the front line firing wildly into the crowd. Michael O'Handley was wounded and trampled by horses. Gilbert Watson was shot in the stomach; he carried the bullet until the day he died in 1958. William Davis, an active member of the U.M.W.A. had been fatally shot through the heart by a British Empire Steel Company thug. The miners reaction was swift and decisive. They swarmed the power plant, overpowered the company police and marched them off to the town jail, later they were taken to Sydney for their own safety.

For several nights afterward, the coal towns were under a state of siege by the miners. They raided the company stores to feed their starving families and then burned the stores to the ground to eliminate the last symbol of corporate greed and servitude in the Cape Breton coal fields. The company stores never re-opened after the coal wars of 1925.

The miners promised that no man would ever again work the black seam on Davis Day. They have kept their promise to this day. In local coal mining communities, many store owners still close their doors in respect for deceased coal miners and our children take time from their studies to reflect with their families.

The men were driven to this action because on top of already deplorable conditions their supply of water and power to their homes, schools, and hospitals was cut off. Cape Breton was seen as one of the few examples of a Feudal system in North America. Soon after, however, the affair was pushed aside and forgotten.

A provincial election that year saw the defeat of Armstrong's Liberal government. The Conservatives under E.N. Rhodes met with Besco President, Roy Wolvin and J.E. McLurg on July 16. The police force was subsequently withdrawn, the wage scale was reduced to the 1922 level (a reduction of between 6% and 8%), the Corporation received a rebate of 1/5 of the coal royalties paid to the province for a 6 month period. On August 5 the miners voted 3,913 to 2,780 to accept the Rhodes Proposal.

The strike had lasted for 155 days and J.B. McLachlan rationalized the suffering this way:

Under capitalism the working class has but two courses to follow: crawl - or fight.

The history of the mine workers is filled with memories of class struggle and of brotherhood. It is summed up in the words of District 26 President, Stephen J. Drake—

There is no finer person on this planet than the working man who carries his lunch can deep into the bowels of the earth. Far beneath the ocean he works the black seam; an endless ribbon of steel his only link to the fresh air and blue skies. The steel rails symbolize a miners life, half buried underground, half reaching toward his final reward. William Davis epitomized a miner's life, it was filled with simple pleasures, family, friends, and sunshine. He will always be one of us, he will never be forgotten

=== DOSCO ===
BESCO was reorganized in 1930 as Dominion Steel and Coal Corporation (DOSCO). At one point, DOSCO was the largest private employer (in terms of the number of employees) in the nation. While employment in coal and steel peaked in 1913 in the industrial Cape Breton area, production increased until the early 1940s as a result of mechanization and increased consumption during World War II. Following the war, coal production went into a decline as newer and cheaper open-pit mines were opened in western North America, railways switched to diesel fuel for locomotives, and nuclear energy and hydroelectricity gained increased acceptance.

In the mid-1960s, DOSCO fell into financial difficulty as coal and steel usage continued to decline. DOSCO announced that its mines had 15 years of production left and that its steel mill was uneconomic to operate without significant modernization. In 1965–1966, a federal Royal Commission of Inquiry called the "Donald Commission" recommended that the federal government create a Crown corporation to take over operation of DOSCO mines with the aim being to gradually wean the industrial area economy off natural resources and into a more diversified service-oriented economy.

=== DEVCO and SYSCO ===
On July 7, 1967, the Cape Breton Development Corporation (DEVCO) was created and on March 30, 1968, all DOSCO mines were expropriated for $12 million by DEVCO. At the same time, the provincial government formed the Sydney Steel Corporation (SYSCO) and took over DOSCO's steel mill, with the aim being to gradually control the shut down of this industry.

DEVCO brought in new tourism initiatives throughout Cape Breton Island and funded various community economic development programs, however politics and other factors such as the 1973 oil crisis brought about by the OPEC embargo following the Yom Kippur War saw demand for coal increase dramatically, particularly for electrical generation. The federal government reversed course and chose to expand, rather than retract, the production of coal and opened new mines and modernized its DOSCO-inherited properties to serve new electrical generating stations. It is significant to note that until 1992, Nova Scotia Power was a crown corporation, and as such treated locally produced coal with preference. During the 1980s the provincial government also modernized the steel mill, however both coal and steel encountered production and financial difficulties in the 1990s and DEVCO and SYSCO both decommissioned their operations by the turn of the century or shortly thereafter. The last underground coal mine on Cape Breton Island closed in November 2001.

=== Post-industrial phase ===
Industrial Cape Breton's economy faces significant challenges with unemployment and out-migration, as well as ongoing efforts to clean up the Sydney Tar Ponds; a legacy of DOSCO, and later DEVCO, producing coke to fuel the blast furnaces at the steel mill. The Muggah Creek estuary opening onto Sydney Harbour near the coke ovens site is contaminated with a variety of coal-based wastes. After extensive public consultation and technical study, a CDN$400-million cleanup plan, jointly funded by the federal and provincial governments awaits further environmental assessment.

In the early 2000s, it was feared that in a classic case of adjustment from an industrial to post-industrial economy, the region would undergo a rapid depopulation as workers with limited skills and financial means would migrate to Alberta energy projects or Ontario and U.S. urban centres. It was projected that the Cape Breton Regional Municipality would depopulate from 100,000 residents in 2006 to approximately 75,000 by 2020, but in fact the population in 2021 was 93,694.

Currently there are no coal mining operations on Cape Breton Island, aside from numerous bootleg mines. Record world energy prices during 2004-2005 resulted in plans to reopen an abandoned colliery at Donkin. Xstrata Coal, a subsidiary of Switzerland's Xstrata Plc Group, was awarded the right to develop the Donkin colliery by the provincial government, and re-opened the mine in 2017, however due to several Cave-ins the mine closed in 2020. The Donkin project had been estimated by promoters that it would create hundreds of jobs for Industrial Cape Breton. It is also envisioned that the Donkin project would help improve the fortunes of the Cape Breton and Central Nova Scotia Railway, whose railway line from Port Hawkesbury to Sydney has been unprofitable since the closure of the coal mines and steel plant. However, the Donkin Mine, operating under Kameron Coal, faced heavy scrutiny for its preference for American workers through the company's abuse of the temporary foreign worker program which gave American employees higher salaries, bonuses, and benefits. The mine reopened in September 2022 but was once again shut down by the Nova Scotia Department of Labour, Skills, and Immigration in January 2023. The mine was under a stop-work order due to outstanding fines and further investigation into unsafe labour practices, however, it has reopened as of May 2023.
