= Cape Breton and Central Nova Scotia Railway =

Canadian railway line

Coordinates: 45°39′2.98″N 61°26′40.1″W

Overview
- Headquarters: Stellarton, Nova Scotia
- Reporting mark: CBNS
- Locale: Nova Scotia, Canada
- Dates of operation: 1993–Present

Technical
- Track gauge: 4 ft 8 1/2 in (1,435 mm) standard gauge
- Length: 159 mi (256 km)

Other
- Website: https://www.gwrr.com/cbns/

The Cape Breton and Central Nova Scotia Railway (reporting mark CBNS) is a short line railway that operates in the Canadian province of Nova Scotia. CBNS operates 256 kilometres (159 miles) of main line and associated spurs between Truro in the central part of the province to Point Tupper on Cape Breton Island. The line used to operate another 157 kilometres (98 miles) from Point Tupper to Sydney, but service on this portion of the line ceased in 2015.

The Intercolonial Railway, later absorbed into the Canadian National Railway (CN), built the line to Sydney in 1890. RailTex, a holding company, purchased the rail line from CN in October 1993 and the CBNS began operations in 1994. The purchase and operation of this route made CBNS one of the first short line railways to operate a route previously owned by a Canadian Class I railroad. On February 4, 2000, RailTex and all of its assets, including CBNS, were sold to the holding company RailAmerica. On December 12, 2012, RailAmerica and all of its assets, including CBNS, were sold to the holding company Genesee & Wyoming. In 2023, CN purchased a stake in the line in order to integrate the active portion of the line into the CN network.

== Route ==
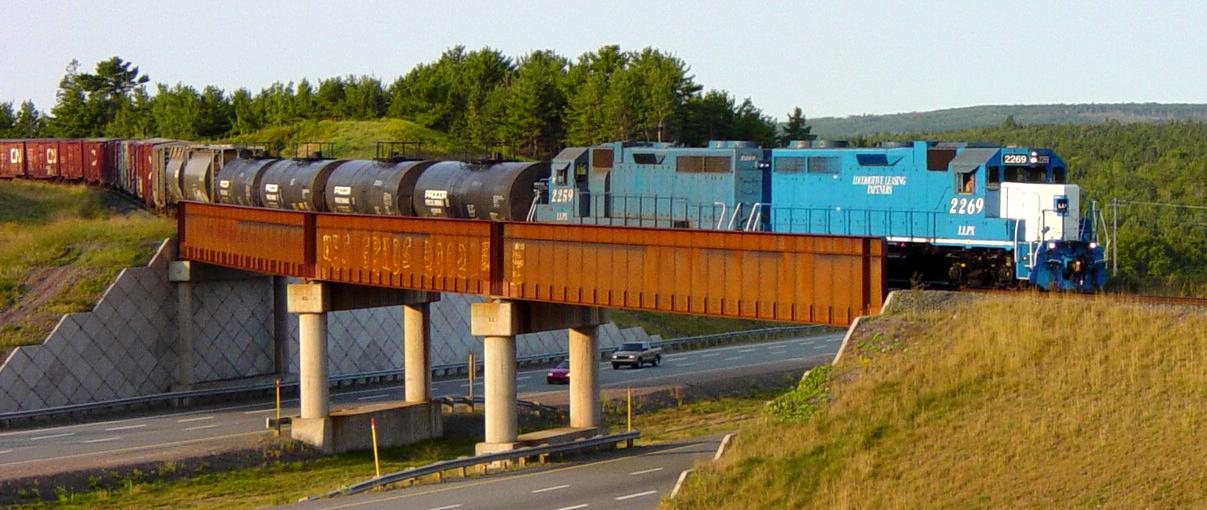
CB&CNSR freight train northbound on the Abercrombie spur, 12 Sep. 2003.

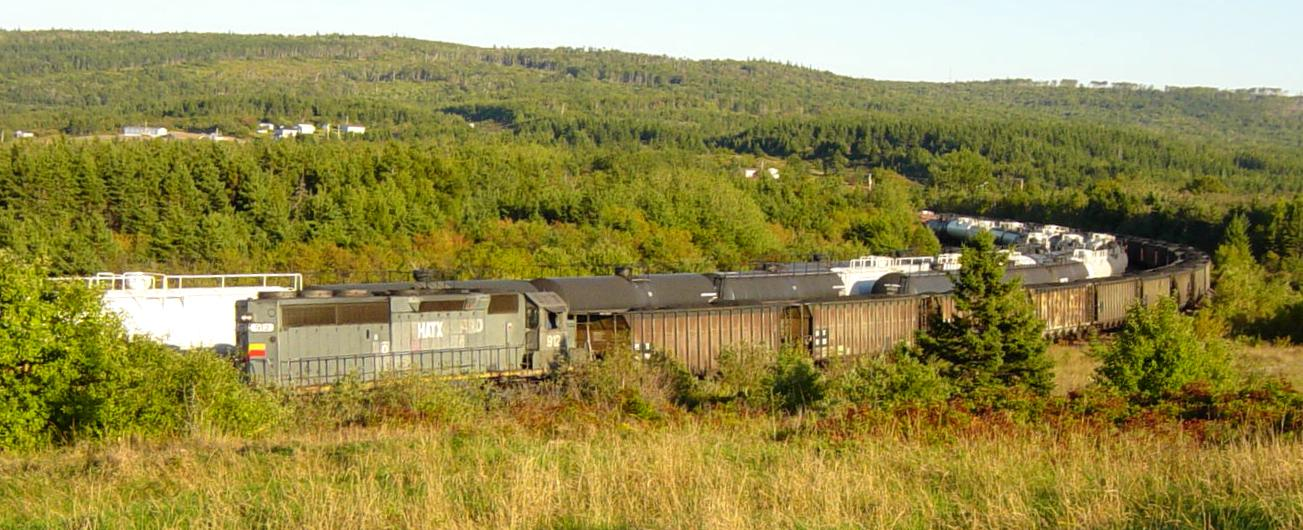
CB&CNSR coal train westbound at Havre Boucher, 18 Sep. 2003.

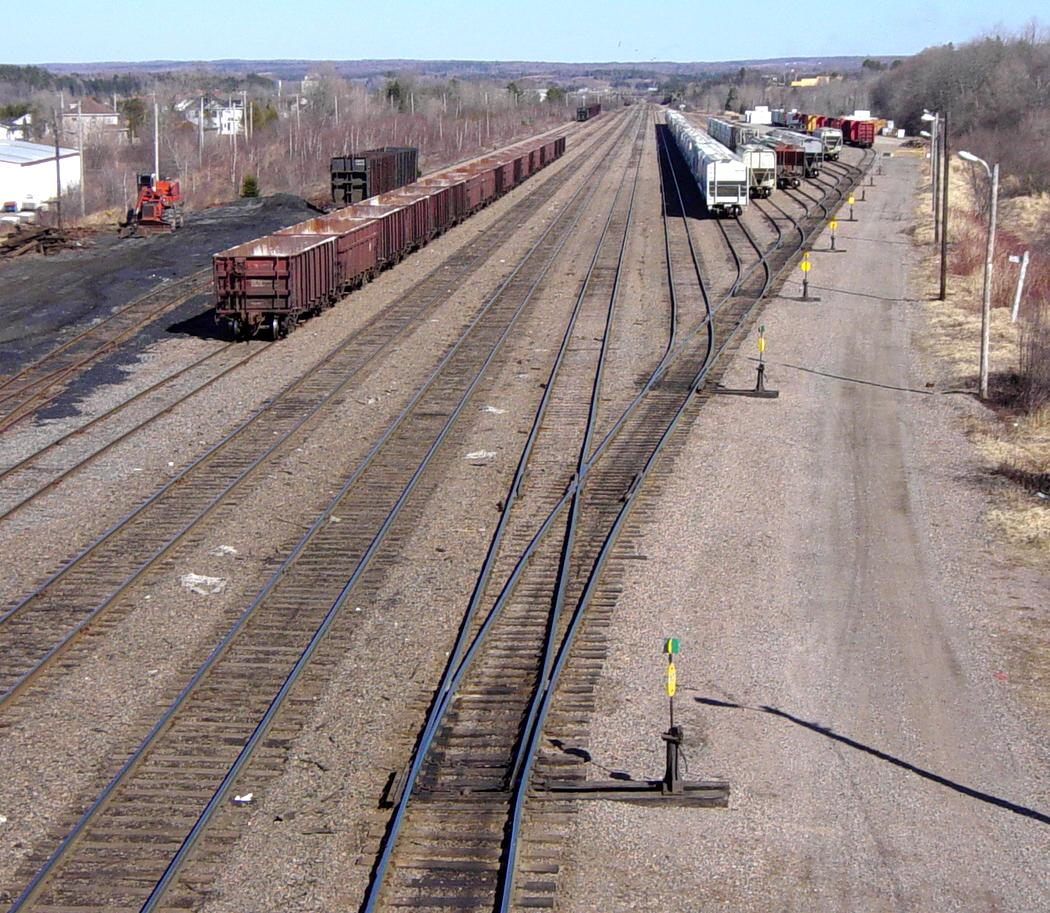
Truro interchange yard between CB&CNSR and CN, 2006.

The CBNS main line crosses varied scenery in central and eastern Nova Scotia including mixed farmland, river valleys, forests, and the Pictou-Antigonish Highlands (considered geologically part of the Appalachian Mountains). The main line skirts various inlets of the Gulf of Saint Lawrence and crosses the Strait of Canso to Cape Breton Island using the Canso Causeway. On Cape Breton Island the main line crosses the North Bras d'Or Uplands (North Mountain - also known as River Denys Mountain) before skirting the shores of Bras d'Or Lake along the Boisdale Hills to Sydney.

CBNS maintains the same two subdivisions over this line as did its previous owner Canadian National Railway (CN):

- Hopewell Subdivision (116.2 miles or 187.0 kilometres) running from Truro in the west to Havre Boucher in the east. Spurs at Stellarton to Abercrombie (10 miles or 16 kilometres) and New Glasgow to Trenton (3 miles or 4.8 kilometres).
- Sydney Subdivision (113.9 miles or 183.3 kilometres) running from Havre Boucher in the west to Sydney in the east. Spurs at Port Hawkesbury to Point Tupper (1.2 miles or 1.9 kilometres) and Jefferson to Edwardsville (2.7 miles or 4.3 kilometres). Since 2015, all rail east of Point Tupper has been out of service.

== Interchanges ==
The line used to interchange with the Sydney Coal Railway (SCR), formerly the Devco Railway, at Sydney, and currently interchanges with CN at Truro. There are railway yards in Sydney, North Sydney, Point Tupper, Havre Boucher, Stellarton, and Truro.

The railroad's business was primarily transporting coal, metal products, paper products, chemicals, drywall products and limestone. CBNS transported approximately 22,000 car loads in 2008.

== Decline of the Sydney Subdivision ==
During the two world wars, the Sydney Subdivision was operating at near capacity handling steel and coal shipments. In the 1950s, up to 180 carloads per day were being hauled. By the 1970s, automobiles and road transport had cut traffic by 50 percent.

The section of the Sydney Subdivision from Port Hawkesbury to Sydney has undergone a significant decline in traffic since CN had sold the entire route to RailTex in 1993.

The first decline occurred in 1997, when CN stopped routing Terra Transport container traffic bound for Newfoundland via the Marine Atlantic ferry service at North Sydney. From 1978 to 1997, Terra Transport containers were hauled by rail to the North Sydney railway yard where they would be transferred onto truck chassis and placed on board a ferry destined for Newfoundland. Until the abandonment of CN's rail services in Newfoundland in 1988, they would be transferred onto CN's narrow gauge trains at the ferry terminal in Newfoundland and delivered to destinations across that province. Following railway abandonment in 1988, the containers remained on the truck chassis for delivery by truck. A combination of changes to Marine Atlantic's ferry service, coupled with a desire by CN Rail to increase traffic at the Port of Halifax, saw these containers re-routed to Halifax where they were hauled to Newfoundland by the shipping company OceanEx.

The second decline occurred in late 2001 when a large steel mill and several coal mines were closed by Sydney Steel Corporation and Cape Breton Development Corporation respectively in the Sydney area. This change resulted in the loss of thousands of car loads per year and threatened the financial viability of the line. The railway retains several small industrial customers and wholesalers that create a combined 1,500 car loads per year east of Port Hawkesbury.

At the same time as this major loss in traffic occurred on the Sydney Subdivision, Via Rail Canada was experimenting with operating a once-weekly return trip seasonal tourist train from Halifax to Sydney called the Bras d'Or. The financial uncertainty of the Sydney Subdivision saw CBNS apply in 2004 to the Nova Scotia Utility and Review Board (NSUARB) for permission to abandon the section east of St. Peters Junction (several miles east of Port Hawkesbury) in 2005. This resulted in Via's decision to permanently cancel the Bras d'Or at the end of the 2004 operating season.

The section of the line east of St. Peters Junction (near Port Hawkesbury) to Sydney has the highest maintenance requirements per mile on the entire railway as it includes the longest railway bridge in the province, the Grand Narrows Bridge, as well as two large trestles at Ottawa Brook. In 2010, CBNS stated that at least 10,000 car loads per year are required to generate enough revenue to maintain the Sydney Subdivision's tracks and bridges in operating condition.

In September 2005, the Government of Nova Scotia announced that it had reached an agreement with the CBNS whereby the government would provide the railway with a $10 million subsidy to keep the rail line from Port Hawkesbury to Sydney open for the next five years, expiring in March 2010. In return, CBNS withdrew its application to the NSUARB for permission to abandon this section of its main line. A one-year extension of this subsidy was approved by the government in September 2010 that was retroactive to April 2010. On 3 October 2011, it was announced that the government had agreed to continue the subsidy for three more years, allowing RailAmerica access to $2 million over the timespan of the deal.

Freight service for this section of the main line was provided by a small twice-weekly freight train that operated as a round trip between Sydney and Port Hawkesbury. Freight service west of Port Hawkesbury to the CN interchange at Truro is operated six times per week by larger freight trains.

In 2008, the holding company RailAmerica which was the corporate owner of CBNS at the time, encountered significant financial pressure from its corporate owner Fortress Investment Group. This saw CBNS dramatically increase the rates it charged to individuals and companies accessing railway property (e.g. driveways, storage, utility lines and pipes, etc.). The resulting backlash saw the provincial government under Premier Rodney MacDonald and his successor Darrell Dexter attempt to negotiate a means to regulate such rates.

In June 2014, the holding company Genesee & Wyoming Inc announced that it would not be seeking a renewal of the provincial government's maintenance subsidy granted since 2005 in exchange for keeping the Sydney Subdivision operating. The company has announced its intention to seek approval to abandon the line in fall 2014 from its regulator, the Nova Scotia Utility and Review Board.

As of 2019, the railway is still operated by Genesee & Wyoming, and the province continues to provide over $400,000 a year in subsidies to the company for its operations. This subsidy will be reviewed in 2020.

Some municipal officials have criticized the standard of maintenance of the line in the Port Hawkesbury area.

Genesee & Wyoming has ended 135 years of rail service to Sydney. The last 301 (westbound) left Sydney December 30, 2014. Under new provincial legislation the railway can't apply to abandon the line (remove the tracks) until six months after the Utility and Review Boards decision of the length of the discontinuance period on which the railway has to offer service to its customers. The boards decision was handed down January 15, 2015 and states that the railway must offer service (which can be trucks) until October 1, 2015. The earliest the railway can apply to abandon the line is April 1, 2016. When freight service stopped north of Port Hawkesbury, the line was carrying 300 carloads per year when 10,000 carloads were required to break even. As of 2026, the tracks between Port Hawkesbury and Sydney are still in place, but vegetation has taken over the line, and the portions of the line have been damaged due to washouts.

== Proposals ==
=== Port of Sydney proposal ===
By 2026, business people in Cape Breton were advocating for the return of freight service between Port Hawkesbury and Sydney. A local 2023 study showed that local businesses would generate a few hundred carloads fewer than required to break even. Promoters were hoping that a restored rail line would allow better use of the Port of Sydney, the closest Canadian port to Europe. However, this would face competition from established ports in Halifax, Saint John NB and Montreal. Using the port for bulk goods such as local minerals, Alberta oil and Saskatchewan potash was suggested as Halifax lacked facilities or space to handle bulk. The estimated cost to restore the line to operation was estimated to be $120 million, which the provincial Public Works Minister felt was an underestimate.

=== Sydney light-rail proposal ===
The Nova Scotia government commissioned Cape Breton University (CBU) to study using a portion of the abandoned, yet largely intact CBNS railway line in the greater Sydney area as a light-rail line. In 2025, CBU released its report for the Cape Breton Regional Municipality (CBRM) Light Rail Transit Study, in which it said the first phase of the line could be built for $143 million, and be completed within 3 years. Experts from AECOM Engineering estimated it would cost about $35 million to fix the right-of-way and lay new track. CBRM buses could bring passengers to stations along the light-rail line. The light-rail line could relieve some of the need for CBRM to buy new electric buses. It would also allow expansion of public transit to other communities. A hurdle to the project would be the need to secure federal funding.

The first phase of the line, as proposed in the study, would run 13.6 kilometres (8.5 mi) from Walmart in Sydney River via downtown Sidney and the Walmart along Grand Lake Road to the university. Later phases could extend the line to New Waterford, the JA Douglas McCurdy Sydney Airport in Reserve Mines, Glace Bay and North Sydney.

== Accidents ==
The CBNS has experienced two significant derailments since taking over operation of the Truro - Sydney railway line from CN in 1993:

- On April 18, 2004, westbound freight train 301-18 derailed ten cars at mile 51.7 of the Hopewell Subdivision near Linacy at approximately 23h35 ADT. Nine of the ten derailed cars were loaded with liquified petroleum gas (propane). No individuals were injured, however, two schools and two residences were forced to evacuate for nine days while cleanup operations took place. The Transportation Safety Board of Canada investigated and determined that the train had been operated safely and that no mechanical defects existed in the locomotives or consist. The investigation determined that the derailment occurred as a result of a track issue; the slower freight train had been operating along a curve that was super-elevated. This type of track configuration dated to the high speed requirements of the Via Rail Canada "Dayliner" passenger trains which were canceled on January 15, 1990. The heavy weight of the slower freight train forced the lower track on the inside of the curve to collapse.
- On June 13, 2010, a westbound freight train derailed sixteen cars on the Hopewell Subdivision in Avondale Station. Six of the sixteen derailed cars were loaded with liquified petroleum gas (propane). No individuals were injured, however, several residences were forced to evacuate for multiple days while cleanup operations took place. The Transportation Safety Board of Canada is currently investigating. A CBNS official was quoted in local media as stating that a preliminary finding had determined that a defect in a non-CBNS freight car was thought to have caused the derailment."Derailment cleanup keeps families from homes". CBC News. June 14, 2010. A subsequent minor derailment in Stellarton the following week where two freight cars left the tracks during a yard switching operation created a minor media sensation. The derailment coincided with a public debate in Nova Scotia about whether the provincial government would extend the five-year subsidy agreement that was tied to maintaining the Sydney Subdivision (eastern section of the railway) where traffic had declined below sustainable levels. A site visit to view track conditions on the Hopewell Subdivision in Pictou County by Nova Scotia's Minister of Transportation and Infrastructure Renewal Bill Estabrooks in September 2010 revealed several track defects. Estabrooks stated that such defects could cause the railroad to lose its operating licence from the provincial government; however, RailAmerica argued the defects were minor and the railroad was safe.
