= Sydney Coal Railway =

Canadian railway line in Cape Breton, Nova Scotia

Overview
- Headquarters: Victoria Junction, Nova Scotia
- Reporting mark: SCR
- Locale: Cape Breton Island, Nova Scotia Canada
- Dates of operation: 2003–
- Predecessor: Sydney and Louisburg Railway, Devco Railway

Technical
- Track gauge: 4 ft 8 1/2 in (1,435 mm) standard gauge

The Sydney Coal Railway (reporting mark SCR) is a Canadian short-line railway operating in the eastern part of Cape Breton County, Nova Scotia.

SCR operates from the international coaling piers on Sydney Harbour in Sydney to the Lingan Generating Station, a coal-fired electrical generating station near New Waterford. The railway's trackage, the piers, and the generating station are owned by Nova Scotia Power, a subsidiary of Emera Inc.

== History ==
The railway line was completed in 1895 by the Dominion Coal Company (DOMCO) between Sydney and Louisbourg. The trackage was organized as the Sydney and Louisburg Railway (S&L) in 1910.

The S&L, along with other assets of the corporate successor to DOMCO, Dominion Steel and Coal Corporation (DOSCO), were expropriated by the Cape Breton Development Corporation (DEVCO) on March 30, 1968. DEVCO operated the railway as an unincorporated department of its Coal Division, however it was informally known as the Devco Railway. DEVCO built a coal preparation and coal wash plant and storage facility, along with new locomotive shops at Victoria Junction, a location midway between Sydney and the Lingan Generating Station near New Waterford.

On November 23, 2001, DEVCO closed its last underground coal mine, the Prince colliery, after the company failed to entice any private sector investors to purchase the mine. DEVCO was out of the coal mining business, however for a period of approximately 1 month, it was in the coal importation business, with trains operating from the international coaling piers to the storage facility and on to the Lingan Generating Station.

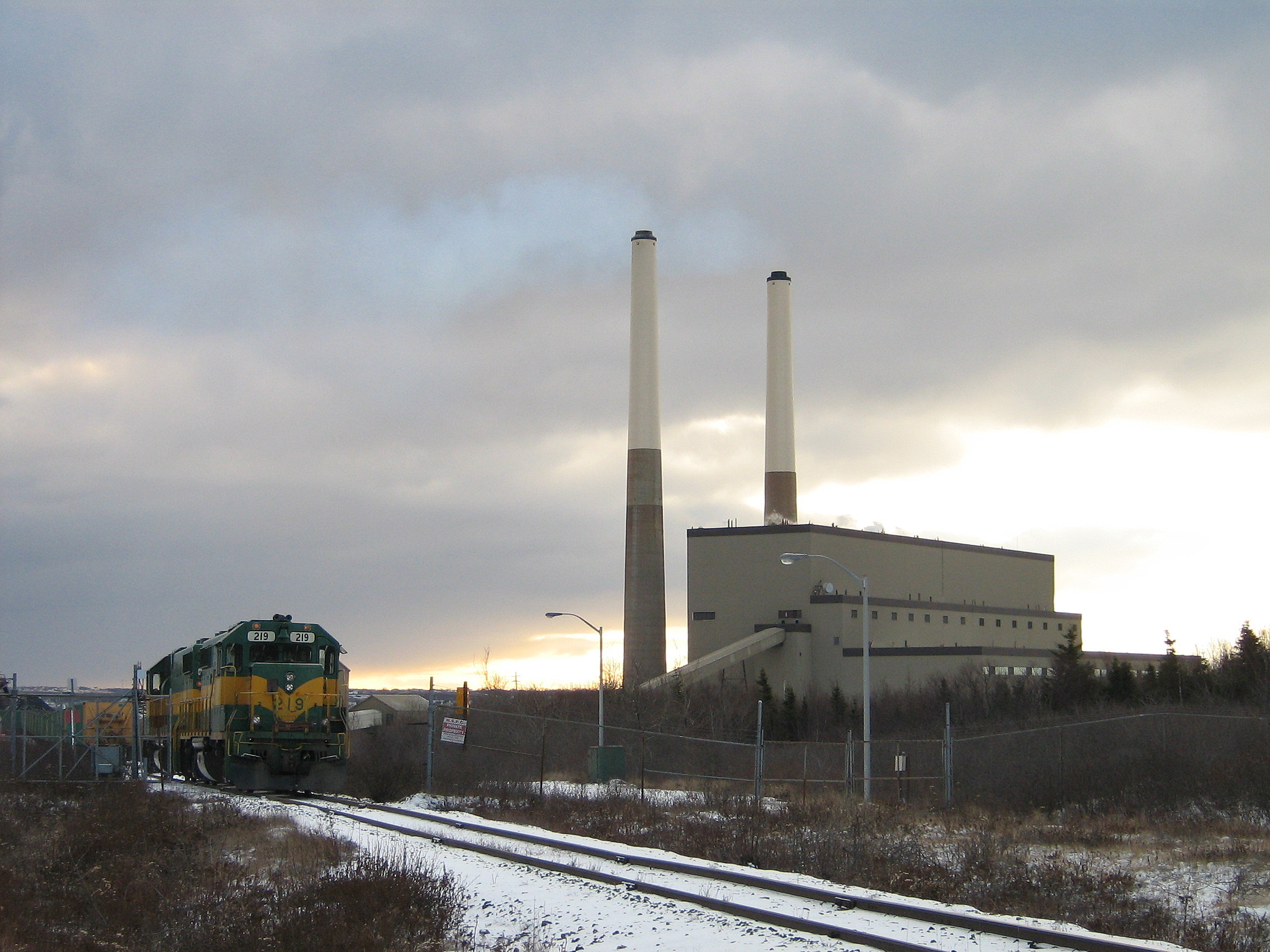
SCR Coal Train leaving the Lingan Generating Station

The federal government moved swiftly to sell off assets, transferring the mine properties and mineral rights back to the provincial Department of Natural Resources. DEVCO subsequently decommissioned the Victoria Junction coal wash plant and began to immediately prepare remediation of the mine sites.

On December 18, 2001 DEVCO sold all surface assets, including the international shipping piers, railway track, railway rights-of-way, locomotives and rolling stock, and a coal storage facility and locomotive shops at Victoria Junction to 510845 New Brunswick Incorporated, a wholly owned subsidiary of Emera, the holding company which owns Nova Scotia Power and operator of the Lingan Generating Station.

Emera subsequently contracted the operation of its newly acquired DEVCO surface assets to Logistec Corporation. Logistec sub-contracted operation of the railway to the Société des chemins de fer du Québec (Quebec Railway Corporation), a Quebec-based railway holding company and short-line operating company. The new railway was called Sydney Coal Railway, although ownership of the track and other assets remains with Emera's subsidiary, 510845 New Brunswick Inc.

Despite SCR having been created by SCFQ as an operating company in December 2001, the railway itself was actually legally chartered to 510845 N.B. Inc. until January 1, 2003, when the Sydney Coal Railway was formally recognized by the federal government.

On November 3, 2008 Logistec announced that it was purchasing the SCR from Quebec Railway Corporation. Logistec ceased to operate the SCR effective July 28, 2018 as it admitted to the Canadian Transportation Agency that it lacked the insurance needed to operate the line. Logistec's operating and maintenance contract with Nova Scotia Power also expired on that date.

== Current operations ==
Current SCR operations consist of running coal imports which arrive at the international coaling piers on Sydney Harbour by bulk carrier from the United States and South America. Coal is unloaded from ships and stored at the pier, and is then loaded onto trains and delivered directly to the Lingan Generating Station. Typical trains consist of a pair of ex-DEVCO GMD GP38-2 locomotives and 21 ex-DEVCO Ortner 5 bay rapid discharge hopper cars. The shop facility at Victoria Junction is still in use, but the wash plant and storage facilities are no longer used.

SCR maintained an interchange connection with the North American railway network at Sydney via a connection to the Cape Breton and Central Nova Scotia Railway (CBNS), with the latter operator possessing a connection with Canadian National at Truro. However, in 2015, the CBNS discontinued service on the line from Sydney to St. Peter's Junction (near Port Hawkesbury). As of 2026, the tracks north of Port Hawkesbury were largely in place but abandoned and unusable.
