= SYSCO =

SYSCO may refer to:

- Sydney Steel Corporation, the Canadian Crown Corporation
- Sysco, the American food distributor
