= Lionel Avard Forsyth =

Canadian businessman (1890–1957)

Lionel Avard Forsyth QC
- Born: 1 August 1890; Mount Denson, Nova Scotia, Canada
- Died: 1 January 1957; Montreal, Quebec, Canada
- Education: University of King's College (BA '09, MA '15)
- Spouse: Elsie Maie Dimock (m. 1915)

Lionel Avard Forsyth QC (1 August 1890 – 1 January 1957) was a Canadian businessperson. He served as President of the Dominion Steel and Coal Corporation beginning in 1950.

Forsyth graduated from University of King's College and Harvard University. He then was employed by the Bank of Nova Scotia in 1913. He became a professor at King's College and later passed the Nova Scotia bar.
