= Devco Railway =

Defunct Canadian railway line in Cape Breton, Nova Scotia

Overview
- Headquarters: Glace Bay, Nova Scotia
- Reporting mark: DVR
- Locale: Cape Breton Island, Nova Scotia Canada
- Dates of operation: 1968–2001
- Predecessor: Sydney and Louisburg Railway
- Successor: Sydney Coal Railway

Technical
- Track gauge: 4 ft 8 1/2 in (1,435 mm) standard gauge

The Devco Railway (reporting mark DVR) was a Canadian railway. Devco Railway operated as an unincorporated department within the Coal Division of the Cape Breton Development Corporation, also known as DEVCO; as such there is no formally incorporated entity named "Devco Railway". Devco Railway took over the operations of the Sydney and Louisburg Railway on March 30, 1968 when DEVCO expropriated the S&L as part of the assets of the Dominion Steel and Coal Corporation, or DOSCO.

== Creation of DEVCO ==
In 1966, DOSCO (then a subsidiary of the Hawker Siddeley Group) announced that its mines had only 18 years of production left and concluded that expense of opening new underground mines in the Sydney Coal Field would be too expensive. The company made its intentions clear that it would be exiting the coal mining business within months.

In response to a vast public outcry in industrial Cape Breton County, the Minority government of Prime Minister Lester Pearson announced J.R. Donald would head a Royal Commission of Inquiry into the Cape Breton coal industry, with hearings held in 1965 and 1966. The Donald Commission recommended that a federal Crown corporation be established to acquire and manage DOSCO's coal operations, with the aim being to slowly wean the Sydney area economy off the coal industry.

"Future planning should be based on the assumption that the Sydney mines will not operate beyond 1981."

On July 7, 1967 the Cape Breton Development Corporation, or DEVCO, was established to operate the mines in the interim, while phasing them out throughout the 1970s and, at the same time, develop new economic opportunities for the surrounding communities. On March 30, 1968 DEVCO expropriated DOSCO's coal mines and the S&L, settling for a payment of $12 million. At the same time, the Government of Nova Scotia took over the operation of DOSCO's integrated steel mill in Sydney, renaming the operation Sydney Steel Corporation, or SYSCO.

The S&L was reorganized as the Devco Railway.

== Devco Railway ==
Initially, the Devco Railway continued to operate much as its predecessor, using former S&L locomotives, cars, trackage, and locomotive shops. Indeed, for several years it continued to operate under its old name of the Sydney & Louisburg Division of the Cumberland Railway. In 1972, with H.S. Haslam as general manager, the road operated 39 miles (63 km) of route with offices at Sydney. At that date the company owned 15 diesel locomotives and 1,100 freight cars.

As DEVCO had been created to shut down the Cape Breton coal industry, the Devco Railway did not have expansion in mind at the outset. Initial operations consisted of serving the old mines, hauling coal to the international shipping piers on Sydney Harbour (Louisbourg's piers were abandoned during the 1960s).

The line east of Glace Bay to Louisbourg fell into disuse as older mines were closed. As part of a regional economic development initiative, DEVCO created a tourist railway named the Cape Breton Steam Railway, to operate between Glace Bay and Louisbourg. In 1973, the Sydney and Louisburg Railway Historical Society was created by retired employees of that company to assist with the tourist railway and to preserve the Louisbourg station. The tourist railway used former S&L equipment and stations, however by the late 1970s it was proving uneconomic to operate and was closed. The track east of Glace Bay was abandoned at this time.

The October 1973 Yom Kippur War and the ensuing 1973 oil crisis led the federal government of Prime Minister Pierre Trudeau to re-examine all Canadian energy production, including the potential nationalization of Alberta's oil, as well as an expansion of DEVCO coal production, reversing the recommendation of the 1966 Donald Commission to phase out production and diversify the Sydney area economy. The Trudeau government sought to use its ownership of DEVCO to reverse Nova Scotia's reliance on the importation of foreign oil for generating electricity; approximately 70% of the province's electricity was generated by foreign oil by the late 1970s.

New mines were built and opened near New Waterford (Phalen and Lingan collieries) and on Boularderie Island (Prince colliery) starting in 1972. Devco Railway built a spur to serve the adjacent Phalen and Lingan mines, extending the line to serve Nova Scotia Power Incorporated's Lingan Generating Station which opened November 1, 1979.

During the early 1980s, DEVCO built new locomotive shops at Victoria Junction, between Sydney and Glace Bay, and shut down the Glace Bay roundhouse and shops. DEVCO also built a large coal preparation and wash plant at Victoria Junction, as well as new international shipping piers on Sydney Harbour, replacing the antiquated export piers inherited from DOSCO. With federal government financing, DEVCO was in expansion mode and with the high international prices for coal, sought to produce more Cape Breton coal for export than ever before.

The Devco Railway modernized its locomotive fleet by retiring the S&L's diesels purchased second-hand during the early 1960s and purchasing General Motors Diesel Limited GP38-2s; a unique design feature of these locomotives was their ability to be used as emergency power generators for various DEVCO mines. Likewise, the coal hopper fleets were modernized, with many being purchased from the Eastern Car Company in New Glasgow.

By the late 1980s, production problems at DEVCO saw the last of the older mines inherited from DOSCO shut down, with production concentrated at Lingan, Phalen and Prince; the latter not receiving any rail service. The Point Aconi Generating Station was built by Nova Scotia Power Incorporated to receive coal from the Prince colliery directly by conveyor belt, however the Lingan and Phalen mines still hauled coal to the Victoria Junction preparation plant and then to the Lingan Generating Station.

The SYSCO steel mill stopped using DEVCO coal to produce coke as a fuel for its blast furnaces in the mid-1980s. By the late 1980s, SYSCO had modernized by changing to an electric-arc process, smelting recycled metal.

Problems with flooding and roof-falls at the Lingan mine saw production cease in 1992, just months short of the colliery's 20-year design limit. The Phalen mine continued to be the only source of online traffic for the Devco Railway, however subsequent flooding and roof-falls at Phalen caused ever increasing production costs at a time of fiscal restraint by the federal government. Faced with rising subsidies, the federal government announced it was getting out of the coal industry in January 1999 by mining out the rest of Phalen by the end of the year and attempting to sell the Prince colliery.

In September 1999, Phalen colliery closed for good, with 400 employees laid off and the only on-line traffic source for the Devco Railway severed. The Prince colliery continued with production, however coal was trucked from the mine to the Victoria Junction preparation plant, from which it was then taken by rail to the Lingan Generating Station. Devco Railway also began to be used for importing some coal from locations in the United States and South America, with the international shipping piers beginning to be used in the reverse of their intended design.

On November 23, 2001, Prince colliery closed for good, after the federal government failed to entice any private sector investors to purchase the mine. DEVCO was out of the coal mining business, however for a period of approximately 1 month, it was in the coal importation business. The federal government moved swiftly to sell off assets, transferring the mine properties and mineral rights back to the provincial Department of Natural Resources. DEVCO subsequently decommissioned the Victoria Junction coal wash plant and began to immediately prepare remediation of the mine sites.

== Creation of Sydney Coal Railway ==
On December 18, 2001 DEVCO sold all surface assets, including the international shipping piers, railway track, railway rights-of-way, locomotives and rolling stock, and a coal storage facility and locomotive shops at Victoria Junction to 510845 New Brunswick Incorporated, a wholly owned subsidiary of Emera Inc., the holding company which owns Nova Scotia Power Incorporated (Nova Scotia Power Corporation having been privatized in 1992).

Emera subsequently contracted the operation of its newly acquired DEVCO surface assets to Logistec Corporation. Logistec sub-contracted operation of the railway to the Société des chemins de fer du Québec, a Quebec-based railway holding company and short-line operating company. The new railway was called Sydney Coal Railway, although ownership of the track and other assets remains with Emera's subsidiary, 510845 New Brunswick Inc.

== See also ==
- List of defunct Canadian railways
