= Dominion, Nova Scotia =

Community in Nova Scotia, Canada

Dominion
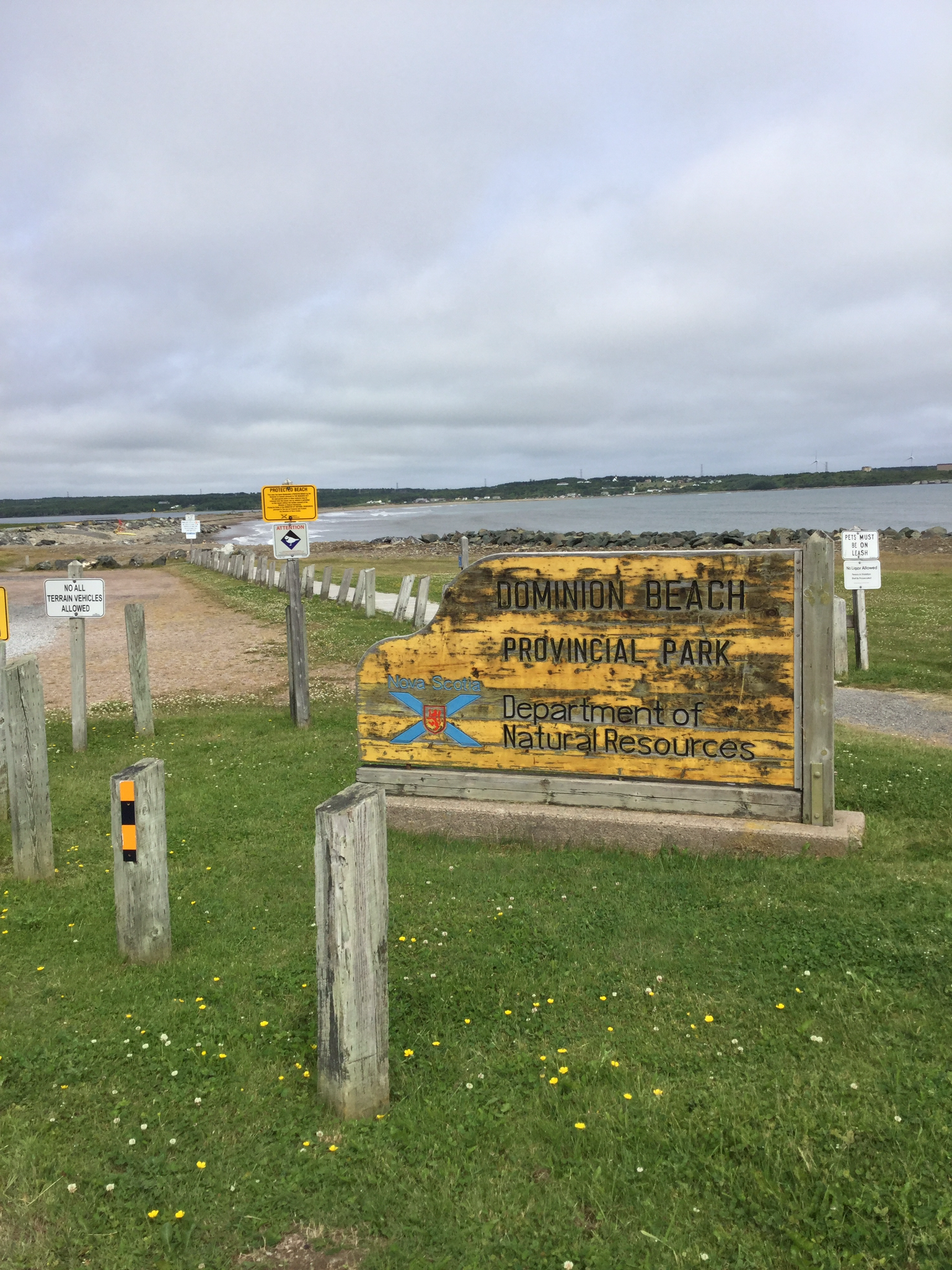
- Dominion Beach in Dominion, Nova Scotia

- Location of Dominion, Nova Scotia
- Coordinates: 46°12′37″N 60°01′30″W
- Country: Canada
- Provinces of Canada: Nova Scotia
- Regional Municipality: Cape Breton Regional Municipality
- Incorporated Town: 1906
- Amalgamated: August 1, 1995

Population (2011)
  - Total: 1,953
  - Change (2006-11): ▼8.5%
- Time zone: UTC-4 (AST)
  - Summer (DST): UTC-3 (ADT)
- Canadian Postal code: B1G
- Area code: 902
- Telephone Exchange: 849, 842

Dominion is an unincorporated community in Nova Scotia's Cape Breton Regional Municipality. It is located immediately west of the larger centre of Glace Bay.

Founded in 1906, Dominion got its name from the local Dominion Coal Company and owed its birth to the coal mining industry as did many of the local communities. Coal was king, and remnants of many old mine workings still run under the town. The local school, MacDonald High sank slightly into one of these mine workings and subsequently had to be torn down.

== History ==
Historical population
Year	Pop.	±%
1901	1,546	—
1911	2,589	+67.5%
1921	2,390	−7.7%
1931	2,846	+19.1%
1941	3,279	+15.2%
1951	3,143	−4.1%
1956	2,964	−5.7%
1961	2,999	+1.2%
1981	2,856	−4.8%
1986	2,754	−3.6%
1991	2,516	−8.6%
1996	2,463	−2.1%
2001	2,135	−13.3%
2006	2,022	−5.3%
2011	1,953	−3.4%

In the eighteenth century, Dominion was part of a larger area called L’Indienne (Anglicized to "Lingan"). The area was inhabited by fishermen and farmers from Acadia and the Basque Country of France and Spain. During the New England and British occupation of Louisbourg in the late 1740s, Baie de L’Indienne (Indian Bay) harboured small boats called shallops which carried coal from the mine at Table Head (part of modern-day Glace Bay) to waiting coal vessels to supply the garrison at Louisbourg.

In May 1748, 120 French and Indians surprised and took the schooner Glover, sloop Ellinwood, seven shallops that were employed in loading coal vessels, and "seven soldiers that happened to be there upon Some Business of their own & without arms." The following day, the raiding party unsuccessfully advanced on the blockhouse fort (Fort William) under construction at Table Head that was to protect the colliery. After this incident, the government at Louisbourg kept an armed vessel moored constantly in Indian Bay for the protection of the coal vessels until the construction of the blockhouse fort was completed.

Besides the capture of the coal vessels and English soldiers at L’Indienne in 1748, the same year the community at L’Indienne was destroyed when several of the presumably French inhabitants took the British Oath of Allegiance against the wishes of their neighbours.

In the nineteenth century, the community on the south side of Indian Bay became known as "Bridgeport," named after a descendant of one of the owners of Rundell, Bridge and Rundell, the English jewellery firm that formed the General Mining Association (G.M.A.) in 1827. When the Town of Dominion was incorporated in 1906, the area became known officially as Dominion and unofficially as Old Bridgeport; Bridgeport was reduced to a small border section between the towns of Dominion and Glace Bay.

In 1830, the General Mining Association opened a colliery at Dominion. It began as a drift mine in the cliff below the present St. Eugene's Parish Cemetery in Dominion and two shafts were sunk at quarter-mile intervals in a southerly direction, the second being what became the Old Bridgeport Mine on Upper Mitchell Avenue in Dominion, which was abandoned in 1842. The original mine was closed in 1849.

Henry Mitchell, an experienced miner and mine manager, reopened the GMA shaft on Upper Mitchell Avenue in 1884. When Mitchell leased the mine from the GMA in 1884, "every vestige of what once had been a thriving mining community had disappeared. He had to build a small camp for himself to live in." All the houses had been removed to Lingan and Victoria years before. The mine employed an average of 60 men and boys. Houses were built for the miners and the coal was shipped on a railroad built by Mitchell that connected to the International Coal Company's railroad which carried it to the shipping piers in Sydney. Mitchell sold the operation to the International Coal Company in 1893, which in turn sold it to the Dominion Coal Company. It operated as the Old Bridgeport Mine until it was closed in 1894.

The Dominion Coal Company operated Dominion No 1 Colliery from 1893 until it closed in 1927.

By 1883, there was daily stage coach service between the Inter-Colonial Railway station at Sydney and the communities of Bridgeport (now Dominion), Little Glace Bay, Cow Bay, Lingan and Louisburg. In 1886, two years after Henry Mitchell reopened the old GMA mine, his son and later first mayor of the Town of Dominion, became the first post master at Bridgeport Mines. Like the community, the post office had a number of names over the years, some of which did not correspond to the name of the community. Bridgeport Mines post office was renamed Old Bridgeport Mines in 1887. When the town was incorporated in 1906, a petition to change the name of the post office to reflect the name of the new town was denied by the Post Office Department, which agreed only to drop the word ‘Mines’ from the name. It was not until 1940 that the post office was finally named ‘Dominion.’

Due to an Italian-Canadian presence, there is an Italian Community Hall.

== Parks ==
- Dominion Beach Provincial Park

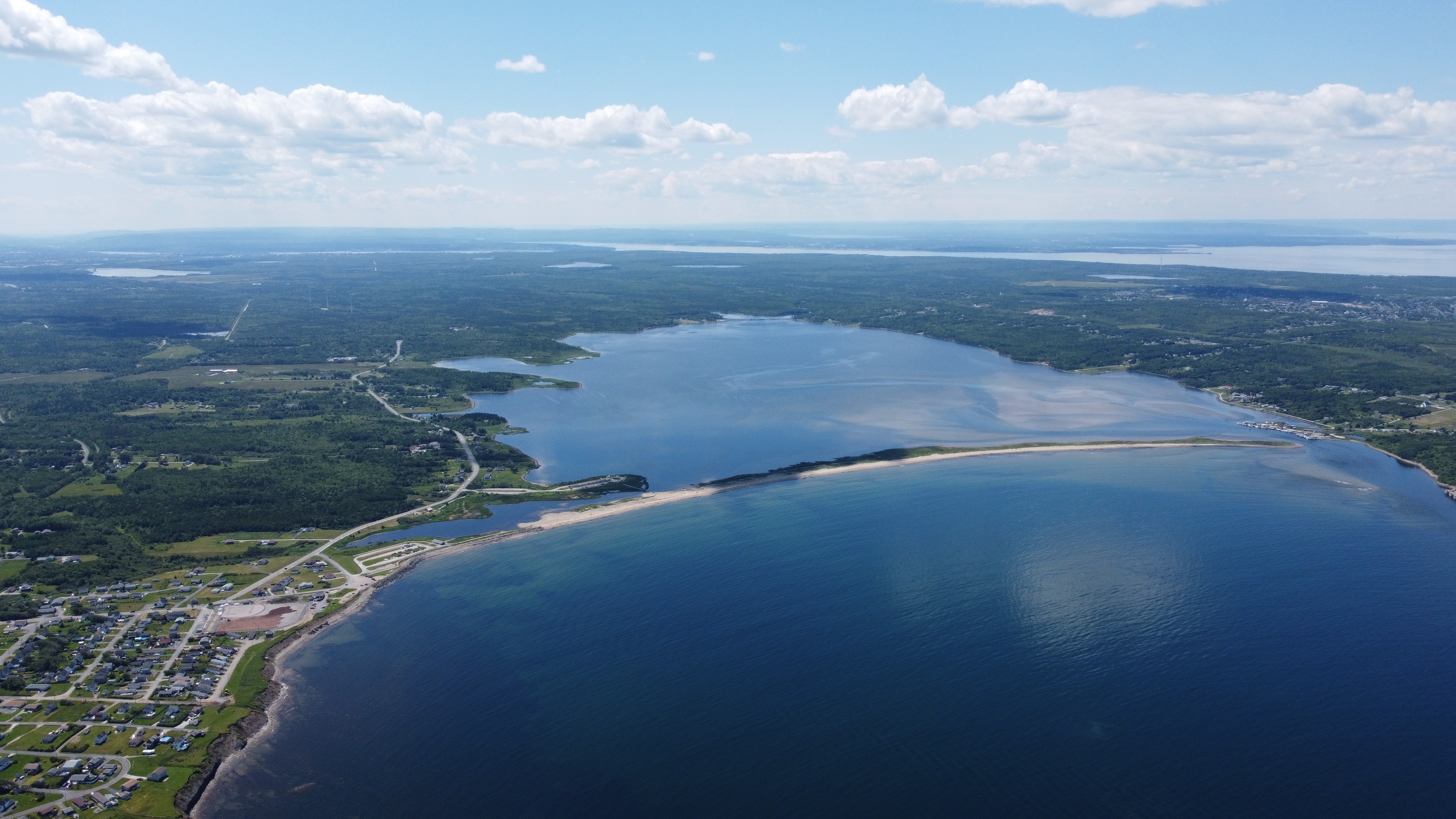
