= Enterprise Cape Breton Corporation =

Defunct Canadian crown corporation

Enterprise Cape Breton Corporation (ECBC) was a Canadian federal Crown corporation which promoted and coordinated economic development throughout Cape Breton Island and adjacent areas in the eastern Nova Scotia town of Mulgrave.

ECBC was established in 1987 to provide a specific geographic focus for the federal government's regional economic development initiatives in the economically depressed region which was undergoing an adjustment from a resource-based economy centred on the coal and steel industries. The town of Mulgrave, on peninsular Nova Scotia was added, since the town had undergone dramatic decline following its bypass as a ferry port and railway hub with the 1955 opening of the Canso Causeway. On 31 December 2009, the Cape Breton Development Corporation (DEVCO) ceased to exist with its remaining assets and staff turned over to ECBC.

Based in Sydney, in the Cape Breton Regional Municipality, ECBC was administered by the Atlantic Canada Opportunities Agency (ACOA) and was the responsibility of Industry Canada.

== Transfer to Atlantic Canada Opportunities Agency and Public Work and Government Services Canada ==
On March 19, 2014, the Government of Canada announced that the operations of ECBC would be absorbed into the Atlantic Canada Opportunities Agency. Existing ECBC staff would be transferred to ACOA, while other functions, such as Real Property, Environmental Monitoring of Mines, and other Human Resource functions would be transferred to Public Works and Government Services Canada.
