= Lingan, Nova Scotia =

Community in Canada

Coordinates: 46°14′1.7″N 60°2′38.3″W

Lingan in Nova Scotia

Lingan (Note: (from the French word "l'indienne") (Mi'kmawi'simk: Milesk, meaning "place of many resources")) is a community in the Canadian province of Nova Scotia, located in Cape Breton Regional Municipality. Its population in 2021 was 229.

Lingan is located on the shore of the Cabot Strait, northeast from Sydney, east of New Waterford and northwest of Glace Bay.

The community occupies a headland which forms the north side of Lingan Bay, to the south, and forms the western shore of Indian Bay, to the east.

Lingan was an active coal mining area from the early 19th century until 1999 when the last coal mines in the community operated by the Cape Breton Development Corporation, or DEVCO, were closed. The most recent mines in Lingan operated by DEVCO included the Lingan Colliery and the adjacent Phalen Colliery. They were served by the Devco Railway, formerly the Sydney & Louisburg Railway.

In the late 1970s, the Nova Scotia Power Corporation constructed the Lingan Generating Station to generate electricity from coal. This plant is still in operation and currently uses coal imported from the United States and South America which is shipped to Sydney and hauled by the Sydney Coal Railway. Lingan has a long history of Irish heritage with some of the most prominent names being Burke, Handrigan, Hall, Hanrahan/ Handrahan, Kelly, Laffin, Miller, and Rockett many of these families have roots going back 7 generations and they continue to live in the community.

During the mid-first decade of the 21st century nine large wind turbines were erected in Lingan along the cliffs on the Northern Head. During World War II, the US army had an observation post here to be on the outlook for German U-boats who were confirmed to have been in the immediate vicinity stalking merchant marine convoys out of Sydney Harbour.

== Demographics ==
In the 2021 Census of Population conducted by Statistics Canada, Lingan had a population of 229 living in 101 of its 106 total private dwellings, a change of −12.3% from its 2016 population of 261. With a land area of 3.99 km^{2} (1.54 sq mi), it had a population density of 57.4/km^{2} (148.6/sq mi) in 2021.

== See also ==
- List of communities in Nova Scotia
