= Matthew Joseph Butler =

Matthew Joseph Butler, CMG (November 1856 – 22 June 1933) was a Canadian civil engineer, businessman, civil servant, and author.

== Life ==
Butler was born in Mill Point, Canada West in November 1856. He studied at University of Toronto.

Early in his career he worked for John Dunlop Evans and Thomas Oliver Bolger.

Butler was Deputy Minister and Chief Engineer of the Department of Railways and Canals from 1905 to 1910.

He moved on from government to become general manager of DISCO from 1910 to 1916.

He died in Sydney, Nova Scotia, on 22 June 1933.
