= Sydney and Louisburg Railway =

Historic Canadian railway

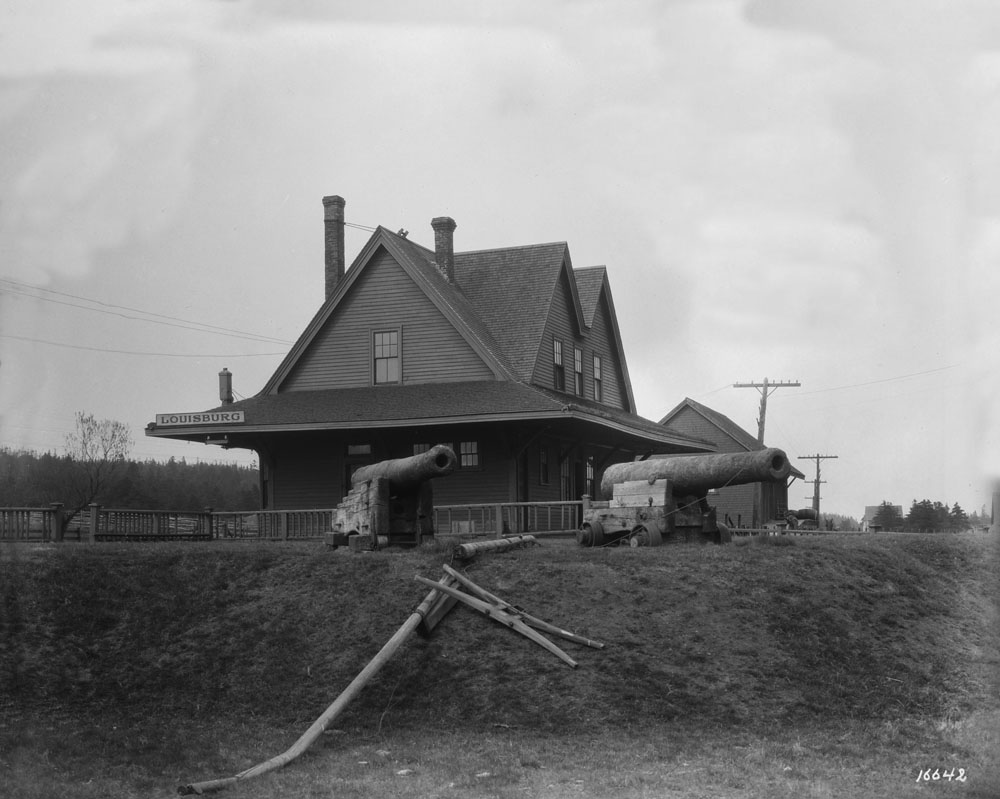

Overview
- Headquarters: Glace Bay, Nova Scotia
- Locale: Cape Breton Island, Nova Scotia Canada
- Dates of operation: 1910–1968
- Successor: Devco Railway, Sydney Coal Railway

Technical
- Track gauge: 4 ft 8 1/2 in (1,435 mm) standard gauge
- Previous gauge: several disconnected 3 ft 6 in (1,067 mm) narrow gauge systems converted to standard gauge 1910-11
- Length: 63 kilometres (39 mi)
- Track length: 187 kilometres (116 mi)

The Sydney and Louisburg Railway (S&L) was a Canadian railway. Built to transport coal from various mines to the ports of Sydney and Louisbourg, the S&L operated in the eastern part of Cape Breton County, Nova Scotia. The railway uses a slightly different spelling for the town of "Louisbourg".

== 1720–1763, early efforts ==
Mining of the Sydney Coal Field can be traced as far back as 1720 when French soldiers from Fortress of Louisbourg pried coal from exposed seams along the coast near Port Morien. Following the Seven Years' War, France ceded its remaining territories in Acadia and New France to Britain under the Treaty of Paris. Upon taking control of Ile Royale, Britain renamed it to Cape Breton Island and merged the territory into the Colony of Nova Scotia.

== 1763–1857, mining monopoly ==
In 1784, Britain split the Colony of Nova Scotia, creating the colonies of New Brunswick and Cape Breton Island, reducing Nova Scotia to just its peninsular territory. In 1788, King George III authorized his son, Prince Frederick, the Duke of York, to be granted the mineral rights to Nova Scotia (then only the peninsular portion), however events such as the Napoleonic Wars put the application on hold until the end of conflict in 1815. At that time, the Duke was in financial difficulty and had an agent apply for the mineral rights which the King had authorized, however the paperwork was misplaced. In 1820, King George III died and the Duke faced financial ruin from debts; the same year saw the Colony of Cape Breton Island merged again into the Colony of Nova Scotia. In 1825 the unfinished application was discovered and approved (for all of Nova Scotia, including Cape Breton Island), whereby the Duke signed over the rights to the General Mining Association, a wholly owned subsidiary of one of the Duke's creditors: the London jewelry firm of Rundell, Bridge and Rundell.

== 1858–1890, organizing and merging ==
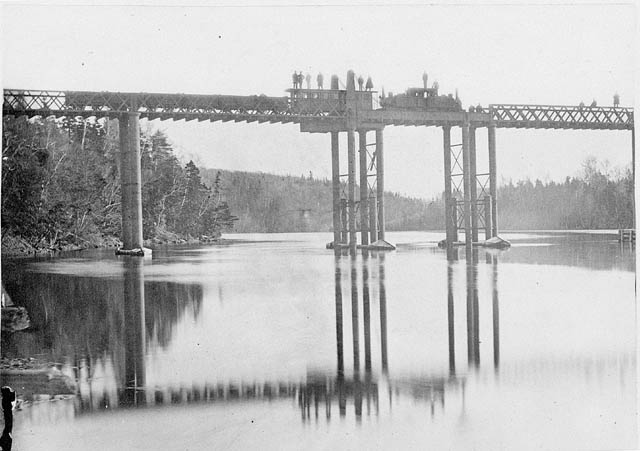
1876 -Mira River Railroad Bridge. Span of 300 feet (91.4 m).

The GMA maintained a monopoly on mineral rights throughout the colony until 1857-1858 when it relinquished these to the colonial government except for certain areas it had developed surrounding the Sydney, Pictou and Cumberland coal fields. Between 1858 and 1870, the GMA opened 19 underground mines in the Sydney Coal Field, with most production destined for export to the northeastern United States. In addition to the GMA, many independently owned collieries opened in the Sydney Coal Field after 1858, including several US-financed operations at New Victoria, Bridgeport, and Reserve Mines.

Several small railways (such as the Glasgow and Cape Breton Coal and Railway Company, and the Cape Breton Railway) were built by mining companies during this time. Geographic obstacles to shipping coal were evident during this age of industrialization with the only suitable harbours being Sydney or Louisbourg; efforts to build harbours on the exposed coast near Glace Bay were rendered ineffective by the weather. Although Sydney had a much more suitable harbour than Louisbourg, the former was frequently choked by heavy sea ice during the important coal-shipment season throughout the winter months. Louisbourg Harbour, which had been selected by the French military for its year-round ice-free waters when building Fortress Louisbourg during the early to mid-18th century, again became a valuable port when a railway line was built from the mines at Reserve to Louisbourg in 1877. This line was poorly built and was soon lost to a forest fire.

== 1890s–1910, creation of conglomerates ==
Large-scale industrialization came to the Sydney Coal Field when two large conglomerates were formed in the 1890s: the Dominion Coal Company, or DOMCO (in 1893), and the Nova Scotia Steel and Coal Company, or SCOTIA (in 1900). The latter was a successor to the GMA and focused its activities on the north side of Sydney Harbour, near Sydney Mines, whereas the former was a merger of various independent companies on the south side of the harbour.

On February 1, 1893, DOMCO was incorporated and it acquired or purchased all coal mines and railway lines between Sydney and Louisbourg on the south side of Sydney Harbour. The conglomerate came to own a variety of both standard and narrow gauge lines, as well as various harbour facilities and coal mines. DOMCO immediately set about to standardize its operations.

DOMCO's railway lines were operated as a department of the company and were rationalized beginning the following year in 1894 when the International Railway was extended to Glace Bay and Caledonia, permitting the abandonment of a roughly parallel narrow gauge line. In 1895 DOMCO extended its railway system south to Louisbourg, following a route further east than the previous 1877 attempt. In 1899, DOMCO financed the Dominion Iron and Steel Company Limited, or DISCO, which constructed a steel mill on the south side of Sydney Harbour in Sydney's Whitney Pier neighbourhood, opening in 1901; this was in direct competition to a rival steel mill that was built by SCOTIA at the same time on the north side of the harbour at Sydney Mines. In 1908 DOMCO built a spur to New Waterford and further spurs were built in the Port Morien, Birch Grove, Donkin and Broughton areas in the 1910s. During the early part of the 20th century, DOMCO's railway lines were considered to be among the most modern in Canada.

== 1910–1968, S&L through boom and bust ==
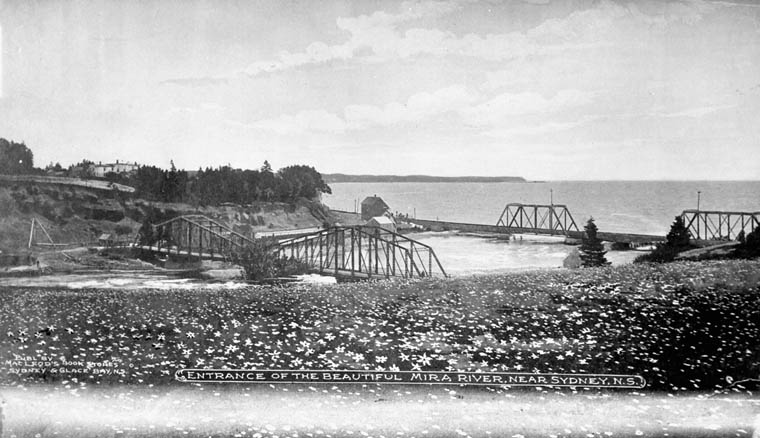
ca. 1900-1925 A view of the road (nearer) and Sydney and Louisburg Railway (further) bridges at the mouth of the Mira River at Mira Gut. Both bridges had swing spans to allow vessels to travel up the Mira River. After the railway shut down the nearer bridge was demolished and the further bridge was converted to carry the road.

In 1910, the Sydney and Louisburg Railway was incorporated to operate all DOMCO railway lines. Note that the spelling of the name "Louisburg" is different from the spelling of the harbour and town of "Louisbourg", which follows the French naming found in Fortress Louisbourg.

In 1914, the steel mill built by SCOTIA at Sydney Mines was closed, however the integrated mill at Sydney continued to expand, using Bell Island iron ore and locally produced coal as a fuel. In 1920, SCOTIA and DOMCO/DISCO merged to form British Empire Steel Corporation, or BESCO, which was reorganized as Dominion Steel and Coal Corporation, or DOSCO, in 1930; SCOTIA and DOMCO remained separate BESCO/DOSCO subsidiaries, with SCOTIA being reorganized as Old Sydney Collieries.

S&L generally served the DOMCO area to the south of the harbour, while the Old Sydney Collieries had its own small industrial railway which interchanged to the Intercolonial Railway line that ran around the west side of Sydney Harbour; the federal government-owned Intercolonial Railway (ICR) having built into the area in the 1890s. Following DOMCO's construction of the railway link between Sydney and Louisbourg in the mid-1890s, freight volumes rose sharply.

Mining employment reached a peak on Cape Breton Island immediately prior to World War I and the dawn of increased mechanization of the underground collieries. The S&L was operating over 116 miles (187 km) of track, 39 miles (63 km) of which was main line, and hauling in excess of 4 million tons of freight, mostly coal; this gave the S&L the distinction of having the most freight per mile of any railway in Canada. In addition to freight, the S&L also hauled passenger trains, mainly employees going to work in the mines or coming home; passenger traffic reached a peak of 176,000 revenue passengers hauled in 1913.

Coal production peaked during World War II in the early 1940s and began to drop dramatically with the advent of internal combustion engines and other sources of heat. Due to the proximity and availability of the fuel, the S&L was one of the last railways in North America to keep its fleet of coal-powered steam locomotives, with 31 on the roster during the 1950s and over 400 employees; the S&L began to dieselize in 1960 however, the last steam locomotive wasn't retired until 1966. In 1961 DOSCO had its subsidiary the Cumberland Railway assume the operations of the Sydney and Louisburg Railway on Cape Breton Island. The reason for this change was that the S&L had been formed under a provincial charter in 1910, which made it ineligible for federal railway subsidies, while the Cumberland Railway, which had a federal charter, qualified for federal railway subsidies. The road did business as the Sydney & Louisburg Division of the Cumberland Railway.

With coal and steel fortunes flagging, DOSCO was purchased in 1957 as a wholly owned subsidiary of Avro Canada, whose assets were transferred to Hawker Siddeley Canada in 1962. Hawker-Siddley's DOSCO subsidiary announced in 1965 that its mines had only 15 years of production left and concluded that expense of opening new underground mines in the Sydney Coal Field would be too expensive. The company made its intentions clear that it would be exiting the coal mining business within months.

In response to a vast public outcry in industrial Cape Breton County, the Minority government of Prime Minister Lester Pearson announced J.R. Donald would head a Royal Commission of Inquiry into the Cape Breton coal industry, with hearings held in 1965 and 1966. The Donald Commission recommended that a federal Crown corporation be established to acquire and manage DOSCO's coal operations, with the aim being to slowly wean the Sydney area economy off the coal industry.

"Future planning should be based on the assumption that the Sydney mines will not operate beyond 1981."

On July 7, 1967, the Cape Breton Development Corporation, or DEVCO, was established to operate the mines in the interim, while phasing them out throughout the 1970s and, at the same time, develop new economic opportunities for the surrounding communities. On March 30, 1968, DEVCO expropriated DOSCO's coal mines and the S&L, settling with Hawker-Siddeley for a payment of $12 million.

== 1968 to today ==
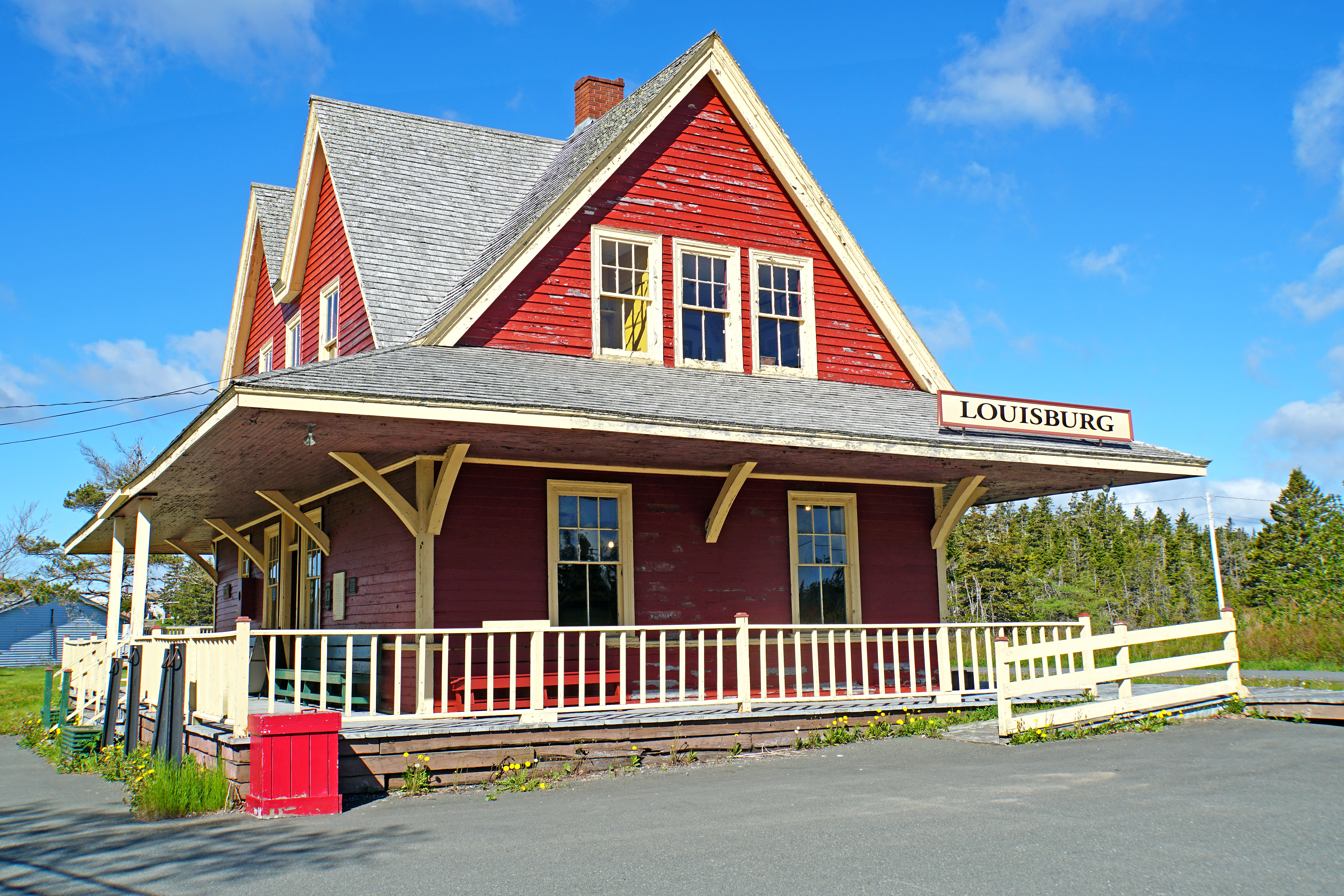
Sydney & Louisbourg Railway Museum

The S&L was reorganized as the Devco Railway, though for several years it continued to do business under its old name. With H.S. Haslam as general manager, the company operated 39 miles (63 km) of route with offices at Sydney; at that date it owned 15 diesel shunters and 1,100 freight cars.

Although the old S&L was essentially shut down in 1972, DEVCO then revised its plans to try and exploit the remaining deposits to the best of its ability. Thus DEVCO continued to operate modest rail services and add new spurs and other facilities where needed. The line east of Glace Bay to Louisbourg fell into disuse as older mines were closed.

As part of a regional economic development initiative, DEVCO created a tourist railway named the Cape Breton Steam Railway, to operate between Glace Bay and Louisbourg. In 1973, the Sydney and Louisburg Railway Historical Society was created by retired employees of that company to assist with the tourist railway and to preserve the Louisbourg station. The tourist railway used former S&L equipment and stations, however by the late 1970s it was proving uneconomic to operate and was closed. The track east of Glace Bay was abandoned at this time.

DEVCO continued operation of the railway until 2001, when it closed the Prince colliery, its last underground coal mine. The railway's assets, which included railway track, railway rights-of-way, locomotives and rolling stock, and a coal storage facility and locomotive shops at Victoria Junction were sold to 510845 New Brunswick Incorporated, a wholly owned subsidiary of Emera, a Canadian multinational energy holding company based in Halifax, Nova Scotia. By 2003, the remaining railway was operating as the Sydney Coal Railway (SCR) which continues to operate a 22.5 km (14 mi) short line transporting coal from the international coaling piers on Sydney Harbour to the coal-fired Lingan Generating Station, owned by Emera.

== See also ==
- Narrow-gauge railways in Nova Scotia
