= Cape Breton Development Corporation =

Defunct Canadian crown corporation

DEVCO logo used until 2008

DEVCO logo used between 2008 and 2009

The Cape Breton Development Corporation, or DEVCO, was a Government of Canada Crown corporation. It ceased operation on December 31, 2009, after being amalgamated with Enterprise Cape Breton Corporation (ECBC).

DEVCO was organized primarily into two divisions: a community economic development organization, and the coal division.

From March 30, 1968, until November 23, 2001, DEVCO's coal division operated Canada's largest underground coal mines, located in eastern Cape Breton County, Nova Scotia. Following decommissioning of its mines, DEVCO sold all non-mining surface assets to the private sector on December 18, 2001, including the Devco Railway and is now remediating its mine sites.

== Creation of DEVCO ==
In 1965, the Dominion Steel and Coal Corporation, or DOSCO (then a subsidiary of the Hawker Siddeley Group) announced that its mines had only 15 years of production left and concluded that the expense of opening new underground mines in the Sydney Coal Field would be too expensive. The company made its intentions clear that it would be exiting the coal mining business within months.

In response to a vast public outcry in industrial Cape Breton County, the minority government of Prime Minister Lester Pearson announced J.R. Donald would head a Royal Commission of Inquiry into the Cape Breton coal industry, with hearings held in 1965 and 1966. The Donald Commission recommended that a federal Crown corporation be established to acquire and manage DOSCO's coal operations, with the aim being to slowly wean the Sydney area economy off the coal industry.

"Future planning should be based on the assumption that the Sydney mines will not operate beyond 1981."

On July 7, 1967, the Cape Breton Development Corporation, or DEVCO, was established to operate the mines in the interim, while phasing them out throughout the 1970s and, at the same time, develop new economic opportunities for the surrounding communities. On March 30, 1968, DEVCO expropriated DOSCO's coal mines and the Sydney and Louisburg Railway, settling for a payment of $12 million. At the same time, the Government of Nova Scotia took over the operation of DOSCO's integrated steel mill in Sydney, renaming the operation Sydney Steel Corporation, or SYSCO.

== Early operation, planning for retraction ==
DEVCO had several operating divisions, including its Coal Division, as well as economic development divisions, intended to help the Industrial Cape Breton area diversify its economy from an over-reliance on the coal and steel industries.

Initially, DEVCO focused on operating the coal mines throughout the Sydney Coal Field that it had inherited from DOSCO, while attempting to invest in other initiatives such as establishing a post-secondary education institution in the area (what would become the University College of Cape Breton, now Cape Breton University), tourism developments, industrial parks for non-coal/steel related manufacturing industries, and investing in small area businesses and community infrastructure projects to help unemployed coal miners and steel workers who had been laid off during the 1960s drawdown in production.

One of DEVCO's first tourism-related developments in the early 1970s was the Cape Breton Steam Railway, a joint project with the Sydney and Louisburg Railway Historical Society, which saw unused Devco Railway tracks between Glace Bay and Port Morien used for operating a tourist railway, with coal-powered steam locomotives. The project ran until it proved to be uneconomic to operate by the late 1970s.

Overall, until 1973, DEVCO was more-or-less focused on continuing the operation of its former-DOSCO mines and railway, while providing new economic growth for the region.

== Expansion of coal mining ==
The October 1973 Yom Kippur War and the ensuing 1973 oil crisis led the federal government of Prime Minister Pierre Trudeau to re-examine all Canadian energy production, including the nationalization of Alberta oil, as well as an expansion of DEVCO coal production, reversing the recommendation of the 1966 Donald Commission to phase out coal production and diversify the economy of Industrial Cape Breton. The Trudeau government sought to use its ownership of DEVCO to reverse Nova Scotia's reliance on the importation of foreign oil for generating electricity; approximately 70% of the province's electricity was generated by foreign oil by the late 1970s.

New mines were built and opened near New Waterford (Phalen and Lingan collieries) and at the northeastern tip of Boularderie Island (Prince colliery) between 1972-1975. Devco Railway built a spur to serve the adjacent Phalen and Lingan mines, extending the line to serve Nova Scotia Power Incorporated's Lingan Generating Station which opened November 1, 1979.

During the early 1980s, the Devco Railway retired its diesel locomotives inherited from the Sydney and Louisburg Railway, which had purchased them second-hand during the early 1960s, and purchased a fleet of new diesel locomotives and coal hoppers, as well as building new locomotive shops at Victoria Junction, between Sydney and Glace Bay, and shut down the Glace Bay roundhouse and machine shops. It also built the tunnels and some surface support infrastructure for a new mine at Donkin in the early 1980s, however, this mine never went into production and the surface and sub-surface assets were mothballed.

DEVCO also shut down a coal wash plant at Sydney Mines and built a large coal preparation/mixing and wash plant at Victoria Junction in its place. DEVCO continued to open the new mines at Phalen, Lingan and Prince while shutting older DOSCO-era mines in Glace Bay and New Waterford; particularly after a fatal explosion on February 24, 1979, at the antiquated No. 26 Colliery which killed 12 miners.

Finally, DEVCO, built a new international shipping pier facility on Sydney Harbour near Whitney Pier, replacing the antiquated export piers inherited from DOSCO. With federal government financing, DEVCO was in expansion mode and with the high international prices for coal, sought to produce more Cape Breton coal for export than ever before.

== Production problems and mine closures ==
By the late 1980s, production problems at DEVCO saw the last of the older mines inherited from DOSCO shut down, with production concentrated at Lingan, Phalen and Prince; the latter not receiving any rail service. The Point Aconi Generating Station was built by Nova Scotia Power Incorporated to receive coal from the Prince colliery directly by conveyor belt, however the Lingan and Phalen mines still hauled coal to the Victoria Junction preparation plant and then to the Lingan Generating Station.

The SYSCO steel mill stopped using DEVCO coal to produce coke as a fuel for its blast furnaces in the mid-1980s. By the late 1980s, SYSCO had modernized by changing to an electric-arc process, smelting recycled metal.

Problems with flooding and roof-falls at the Lingan mine saw production cease in 1992, just months short of the colliery's 20-year design limit. The Phalen mine continued to be the only source of online traffic for the Devco Railway, however subsequent flooding and roof-falls at Phalen caused ever increasing production costs at a time of fiscal restraint by the federal government.

In mid-2008 DEVCO sponsored the new Industrial Research Chair in Mine Water Remediation & Management at Cape Breton University in order to assist in the mine closure and to research in new environmentally friendly after uses of the mining legacy.

== Layoffs and selling of assets ==
Faced with rising subsidies for DEVCO, the federal government announced it was getting out of the coal industry in January 1999 by mining out the rest of Phalen by the end of the year and attempting to sell the Prince colliery.

In September 1999, Phalen colliery closed for good, with 400 employees laid off and the only on-line traffic source for the Devco Railway severed. The Prince colliery continued with production, however coal was trucked from the mine to the Victoria Junction preparation plant, from which it was then taken by rail to the Lingan Generating Station. Devco Railway also began to be used for importing some coal from locations in the United States and South America, with the international shipping piers beginning to be used in the reverse of their intended design.

On November 23, 2001, Prince colliery closed for good, after the federal government failed to entice any private sector investors to purchase the mine. DEVCO was out of the coal mining business, however for a period of approximately 1 month, it was in the coal importation business. The federal government moved swiftly to sell off assets, transferring the mine properties and mineral rights back to the provincial Department of Natural Resources. DEVCO subsequently decommissioned the Victoria Junction coal wash plant and began to immediately prepare remediation of the mine sites.

On December 18, 2001 DEVCO sold all surface assets, including the international shipping piers, railway track, railway rights-of-way, locomotives and rolling stock, and a coal storage facility and locomotive shops at Victoria Junction to 510845 New Brunswick Incorporated, a wholly owned subsidiary of Emera Inc., the holding company which owns Nova Scotia Power Incorporated (Nova Scotia Power Corporation having been privatized in 1992).

Emera subsequently contracted the operation of its newly acquired DEVCO surface assets to Logistec Corporation. Logistec sub-contracted operation of the railway to the Société des chemins de fer du Québec, a Quebec-based railway holding company and short-line operating company. The new railway was called Sydney Coal Railway, although ownership of the track and other assets remains with Emera's subsidiary, 510845 New Brunswick Inc. Logistec operates the international piers, which handles coal imports from the United States and South America, while Sydney Coal Railway hauls the coal to the storage facility at Victoria Junction before transporting it to NSP's Lingan Generating Station.

Since 2018 CANAC a subsidiary of SAVAGE Services, a global logistics company has run the International Coal Pier importing and delivering coal to both Lingan and Point Aconi Power Plants via rail and highway trucks.

== Cessation of DEVCO ==
On December 31, 2009, DEVCO was amalgamated with Enterprise Cape Breton Corporation (ECBC). The cessation of DEVCO was a death blow to Cape Breton’s already fragile economy. With the closure of the remaining coal mines and the withdrawal of federal support, thousands of jobs vanished almost overnight, gutting the island’s industrial backbone. No serious efforts were made to replace the lost industry with sustainable alternatives, leaving a vacuum that has yet to be meaningfully filled. In many ways, DEVCO’s end marked the final unraveling of Cape Breton’s industrial identity.
