= Lingan Generating Station =

Power station in Nova Scotia, Canada

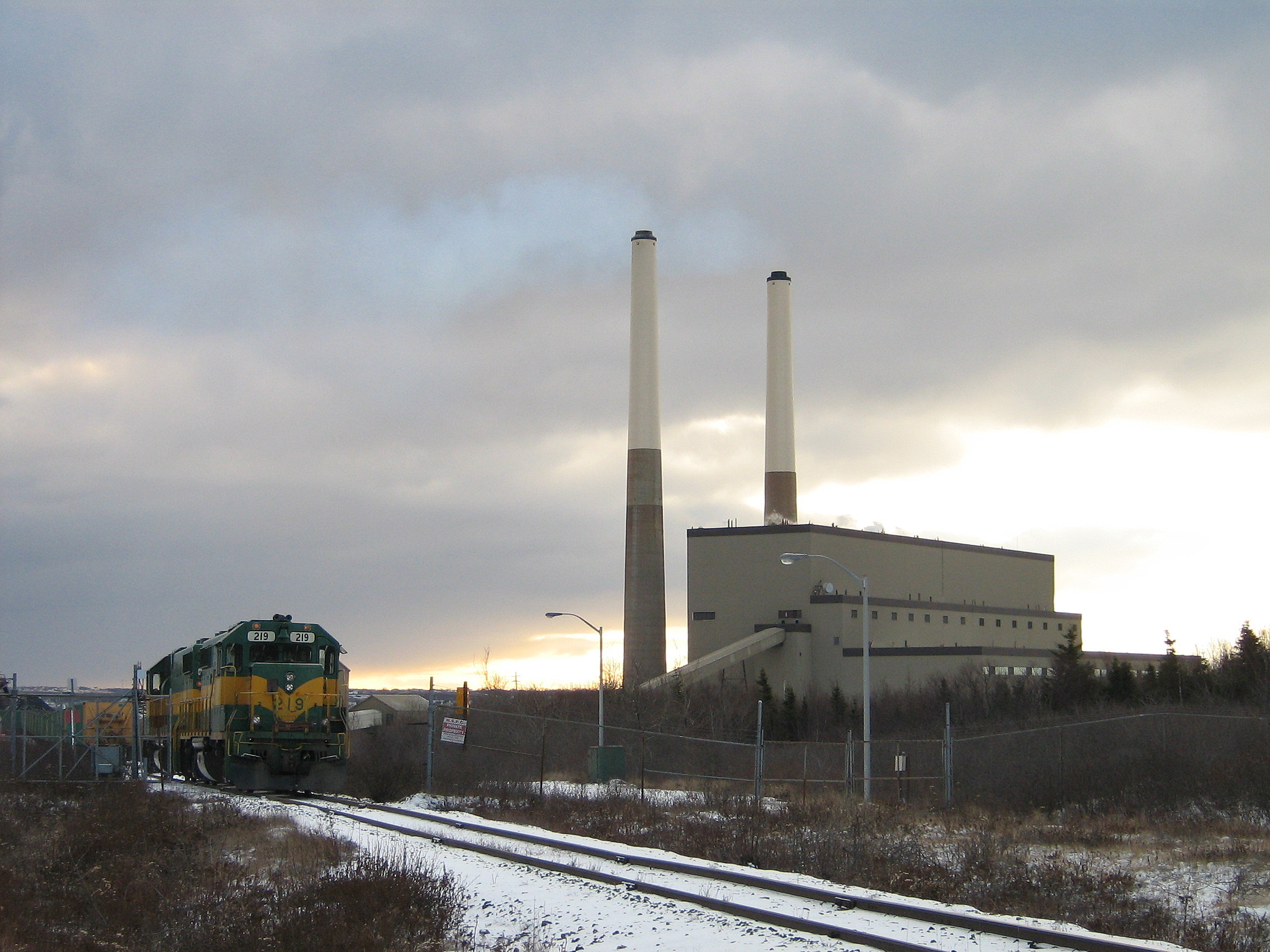
- The Lingan Generating Station viewed from the north
- Lingan Generating Station, Nova Scotia
- Country: Canada
- Location: Lingan, Nova Scotia
- Coordinates: 46.235541°N 60.039270°W
- Status: Operational
- Construction began: 1977
- Commission date: 1 November 1979
- Construction cost: $400,000,000
- Owner: Nova Scotia Power
- Employees: 120

Thermal power station
- Primary fuel: Coal
- Secondary fuel: Number 6 fuel oil

Power generation
- Units operational: 4
- Nameplate capacity: 620 MW
- Annual net output: 2,288 GWh (2014)

External links
- Website: https://www.nspower.ca
- Commons: Related media on Commons

The Lingan Generating Station is a 620 MW Canadian coal-fired electrical generating station located in the community of Lingan in Nova Scotia's Cape Breton Regional Municipality. Lingan is operated by Nova Scotia Power Inc. and is their largest generating station.

Lingan Generating Station rests on the shores of the Cabot Strait, open to Indian Bay, approximately 1.6 km (0.99 mi) south-west of the headland named North Head and 0.7 km (0.43 mi) north of the headland named Little Head. Its civic address is 2599 Hinchey Avenue, Lingan, NS.

A thermal generating station, Lingan was opened by then-provincial Crown corporation Nova Scotia Power Corporation on November 1, 1979 at the height of the 1970s oil crisis. It was designed to burn bituminous coal mined by the Cape Breton Development Corporation (DEVCO) at the nearby Lingan Colliery and the adjacent Phalen Colliery as a means of reducing Nova Scotia's reliance of foreign oil for electrical generation.

== History ==
In the years following World War II, Nova Scotia, in common with many other areas of the world, turned to oil to fire its generating stations to such an extent that 70% of its electricity was then generated from oil. Formation of the OPEC cartel in 1973 brought an end to low-priced oil and the price of electricity produced from burning oil increased dramatically. Nova Scotia's solution to the international oil crisis was to exploit a provincial natural resource, coal.

== Technical characteristics ==
The Lingan Generating Station consists of four 150 MW units commissioned between 1979 and 1984. The station burns bituminous coal and small amounts of petroleum coke in a variety of blends at each unit. The turbines and electric generators were manufactured by Toshiba Energy Systems & Solutions Corporation. Unit 1 was commissioned in 1979, Unit 2 in 1980, Unit 3 in 1983, and Unit 4 in 1984. The capacities of the individual units average at 153 MW each, and range between 148 MW at Lingan 2 to 157 MW at Lingan 4. All units have over-fire air to control NO_{x} and cold-side electrostatic precipitators to remove fly ash from the exhaust. As of 2010 there was no SO_{2}, control. Fly ash is handled dry and bottom ash is handled wet. There are two 152 m (499 ft) chimneys for exhaust gas. These chimneys are tied with those at Tufts Cove Generating Station and Trenton Generating Station as the tallest structures in Nova Scotia, and tied as the 27th tallest in Canada. The plant uses sea water for cooling, from the adjacent Indian Bay.

The plant consumes 1.5 million tonnes of coal per year and currently generates approximately twenty-five percent of the province's electricity, while producing roughly fifty percent of the province's air pollution, including hydrochloric acid, sulphuric acid, hexachlorobenzene and mercury. Emissions in the form of particulates are a frequent source of pollution complaints in the neighbourhood and region.

=== 2001 shut down of local coal mines ===
Until the 2001 shut down of coal production by DEVCO, Lingan was supplied almost exclusively with locally mined coal from the Sydney Coal Field. Following closure of its mines, Nova Scotia Power purchased the federal Crown corporation's surface assets, including shipping piers on Sydney Harbour and the Devco Railway which was used to haul coal to the Lingan Generating Station. Nova Scotia Power subcontracted with the Quebec Railway Corporation to operate this rail line as the Sydney Coal Railway. In order to meet emissions standards, the company now imports coal containing fewer pollutants from the United States and South America, which is hauled from the Port of Sydney by the SCR to the generating station.

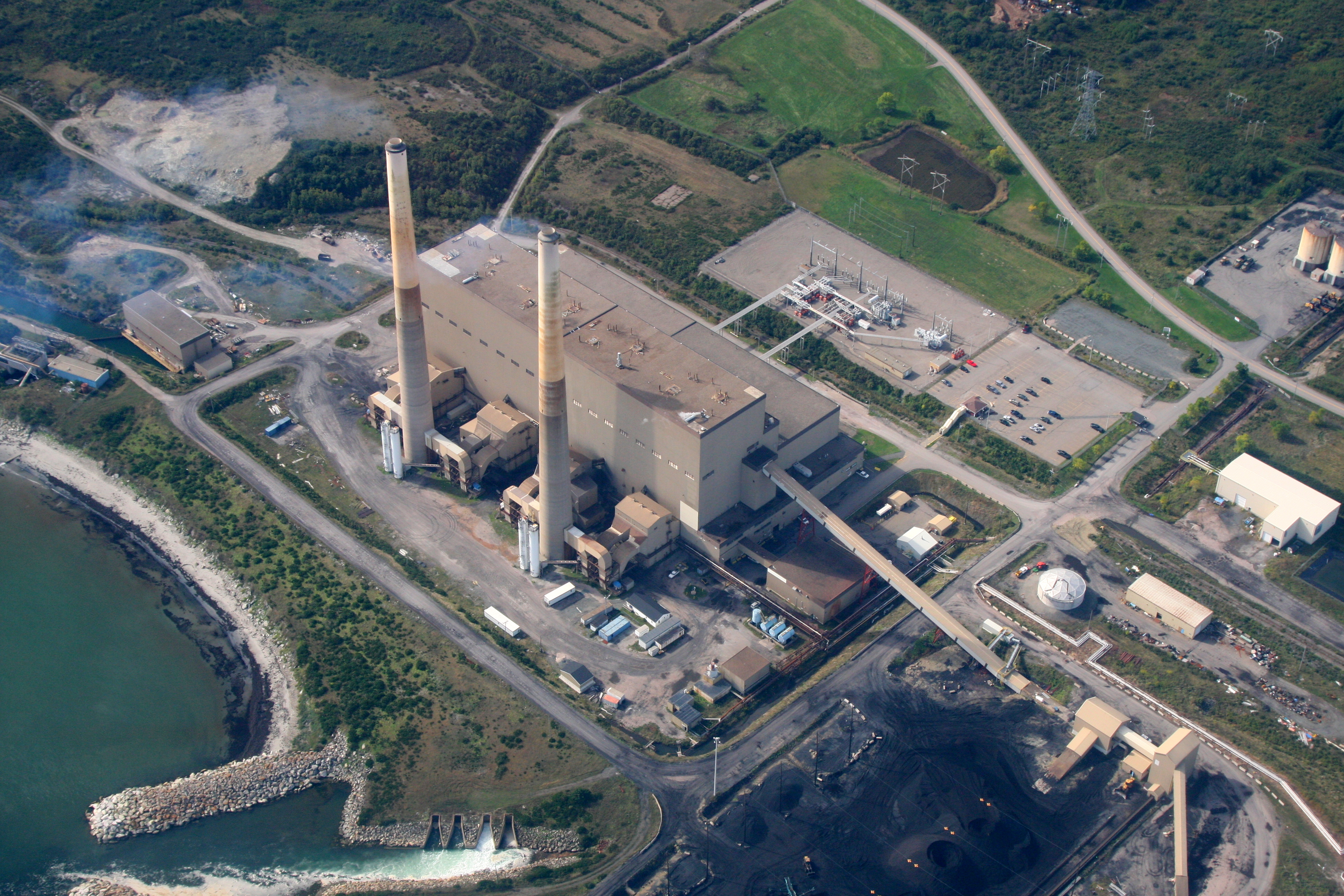
Lingan Generating Station

=== 2005 Upgrade and Scrubbers ===
In 2005, Nova Scotia Power announced a $100 million upgrade for the Lingan Generating Station, including the installation of a scrubber for flue gas desulphurization (FGD) and low nitrogen oxide burners. The ‘Low-NOx’ combustion systems help prevent the creation of nitrogen oxides with a resulting reduction in NOx emissions of about 40 per cent. The scrubbers were installed from 2006 to 2008 on all four units. At the same time, activated carbon injection was added to all the units to remove mercury from flue gas.

=== 2015 renovations ===
In 2015 Nova Scotia Power spent $15 million to give one of its four coal fired generators a major overhaul. The work involved completely tearing apart the turbine and the generator and then refurbishing and replacing numerous components as part of regular maintenance. Regularly about 120 people work at the Lingan power plant. About 130 additional workers were hired to help with the upgrades, with about 50 of those workers outside contractors.

== 1994 Near collision ==
On April 14, 1994, a courier flight originating from Moncton and destined for Sydney Airport had a near collision event with the power plant. Witnesses reported that the plane had nearly struck the building on its approach to the airport. An investigation into the incidence later confirmed that the plane had dropped to 140 feet agl and came within 50 feet of the structure while traveling at over 300 mph.

The Transportation Safety Board of Canada (TSB) determined that the crew did not properly plan and fly their approach to the Sydney Airport, which resulted in a near collision with the Lingan power generating plant. Contributing factors to this occurrence were the flight crew's complacent attitude, their loss of situational awareness, their decision to continue an unstabilized approach, and the controller's lack of compliance with the radar vectoring procedures outlined in the Air Traffic Control (ATC) Manual of Operations (MANOPS).

== 2012 Reduced operation and conversion ==
Since 2012, the utility has been shutting down two of Lingan's generators during the summer months, due to lower residential and industrial demand, increased renewable energy use and to meet environmental requirements. Nova Scotia Power is also looking at converting the generating station to use heavy fuel oil after the current generators are closed in 2030.

== See also ==
- List of power stations in Canada
- List of tallest smokestacks in Canada
