= Sydney Steel Corporation =

Canadian steelmaker

- Type: Crown corporation
- Industry: Steel
- Founded: 1 December 1967
- Defunct: 2001
- Headquarters: Sydney, Nova Scotia
- Website: sysco.ns.ca

Sydney Steel Corporation (SYSCO) was a Crown corporation in the province of Nova Scotia, Canada. It owned and operated a steel mill in Sydney.

== Early history of steelmaking in Sydney ==
An integrated steel mill was established on the southeast side of Sydney Harbour in the Whitney Pier neighbourhood of Sydney, Nova Scotia in 1901 by American investors. This entity was named Dominion Iron and Steel Company Limited (DISCO). Coal from the Dominion Coal Company Limited (DOMCO) was used to create coke to fuel the blast furnaces for smelting iron ore which arrived from Bell Island, Newfoundland.

In 1920, DISCO, the Nova Scotia Steel and Coal Company (SCOTIA) in Sydney Mines, and the Wabana ore mine on Bell Island were acquired by the British Empire Steel Corporation (BESCO). In 1930, BESCO reorganized as Dominion Steel and Coal Corporation (DOSCO). Hawker Siddeley Canada purchased DOSCO in 1957.

== Donald Commission ==
Hawker Siddeley sought to eliminate money losing operations and in 1965, DOSCO announced that its mines had only 15 years of production left and concluded that the cost of opening new underground mines in the Sydney Coal Field would be too expensive. The company made its intentions clear that it would be exiting the coal mining business within months. DOSCO's continued operation of its steel mill, lacking modernization and far removed from the steel markets of the midwest and central Canada, was uncertain at best.

In response to a vast public outcry in industrial Cape Breton County, the Minority government of Prime Minister Lester Pearson announced J.R. Donald would head a Royal Commission of Inquiry into the Cape Breton coal industry, with hearings held in 1965 and 1966. The Donald Commission recommended that a federal Crown corporation be established to acquire and manage DOSCO's coal operations, with the aim being to slowly wean the Sydney area economy off the coal industry.

Future planning should be based on the assumption that the Sydney mines will not operate beyond 1981.

On July 7, 1967 the Cape Breton Development Corporation, or DEVCO, was established to operate the mines in the interim, while phasing them out throughout the 1970s and, at the same time, develop new economic opportunities for the surrounding communities.

== Nationalization ==
On December 1, 1967, the provincial government established Sydney Steel Corporation (SYSCO) under an act of the provincial legislature. to operate DOSCO's steel mill for a period of 12 months until the steel mill could be resold to another private operator.

On March 30, 1968 DEVCO expropriated DOSCO's coal mines and the Sydney and Louisburg Railway, settling for a payment of $12 million. The federal government's plans to gradually shut down coal operations during the 1970s were derailed by rising world energy prices and changes in political priorities. Similarly, the provincial government's 1-year temporary commitment to transitioning ownership of the steel mill from DOSCO turned into a 33-year commitment, adding over $1 billion to the cash-strapped province's debt.

SYSCO became a political football for economically depressed Industrial Cape Breton and no provincial government dared to shut it down, opting instead to use heavily subsidized federally produced DEVCO coal for coking fuel to continue running the antiquated mill. Over time, the provincial government gave limited capital investments to SYSCO from the late 1970s into the early 1980s. In the mid-1980s the provincial government of premier John Buchanan decided to modernize the steel mill prior to selling it to the private sector. This modernization changed the steel making process from a fully integrated oxygen blast plant using iron ore into an electric arc mini mill using scrap steel. The blast process fuelled by coke was mothballed in favour of using electricity to smelt the scrap recycled metal brought in by rail.

== Closure ==
With no purchasers from the private sector and tumultuous steel markets during the 1990s, the provincial government began to seek ways to rid itself of SYSCO. Numerous proposals for sale to foreign and domestic companies came and went, raising and lowering the hopes of Sydney and its surrounding area each time announcements were made and then promises broken.

Finally, the Progressive Conservative government of John Hamm opted to sever provincial funding for the company entirely upon being elected in 1999. Sydney Steel Corporation's board of directors was disbanded on 25 January 2001. The liquidation of the corporation began soon after. In July 2001, it was announced that SYSCO's mini mill was being sold to an Indian company named Zoom Developers who planned to dismantle it and ship it overseas.

Despite worker protests, SYSCO's steel production was shut down that year with the site remediation talking taking place over the next two decades. The area is now an industrial and sports park.

== Environmental legacy ==
Until the mid-1980s, SYSCO along with its predecessors, Hawker Siddeley, DOSCO, BESCO, and DOMCO/DISCO, was a user of coke as a fuel for the mill's blast furnaces. Coke is produced by slowly baking coal, evaporating or leaching out various liquids in the process.

The coke ovens used in Sydney were located across Victoria Road from the steel mill and since 1967 were operated by the federal Crown corporation DEVCO, which also operated the mines that produced the coal supply. The associated run-off from these coke ovens over a period of 85 years ended up in the Muggah Creek tidal estuary downhill from the coke ovens and adjacent to the steel mill, creating the Sydney Tar Ponds.

Site remediation was carried out by Nova Scotia Lands Incorporated and Harbourside Commercial Park Inc., a Crown corporation formed to redevelop the site as a commercial and industrial estate. The cleanup was completed in 2013 with the opening of Harbourside Commercial Park and Open Hearth Park, which are situated on the site of the former Sydney Steel Corporation. Open Hearth Park features a playground and soccer field, and has hosted events such as a concert by international recording stars Aerosmith in September 2014.

In 2006, Carole Lee Boutilier, founder of the Sydney Steel Plant Museum, contributed a sample of steel rail to the Six String Nation project. Part of that material was inlaid as a fret marker into the 17th fret of Voyageur, the guitar at the heart of the project.
