= Bridgeport, Nova Scotia =

Community in Nova Scotia, Canada

Coordinates: 46°12′42.46″N 60°0′7.83″W

Bridgeport in Nova Scotia

Bridgeport is a neighbourhood that is part of the former town of Glace Bay, Nova Scotia in the Canadian province of Nova Scotia, located in the Cape Breton Regional Municipality on Cape Breton Island.
