= Louisbourg =

Community in Nova Scotia, Canada

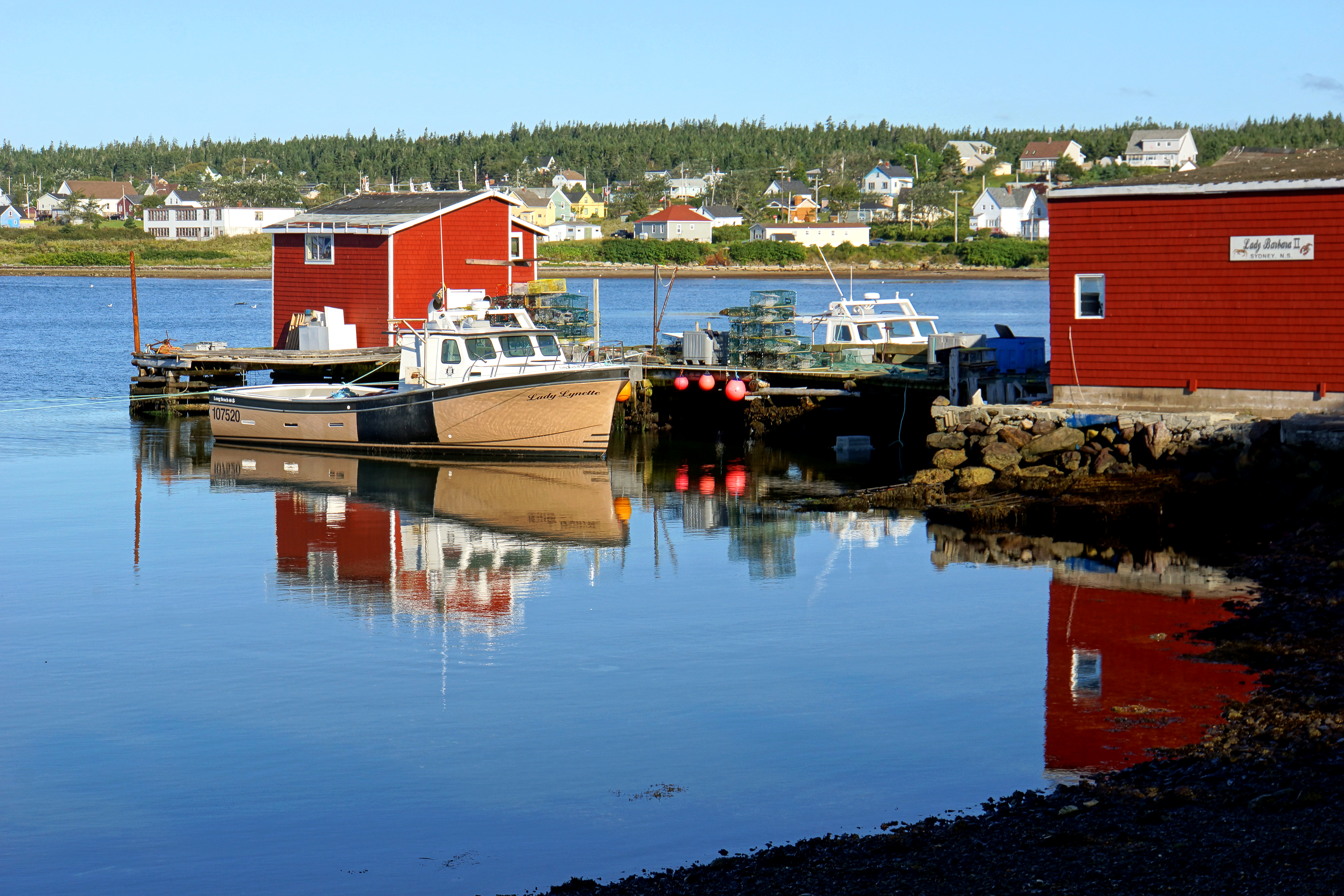
- Louisbourg Harbour

- Location of Louisbourg, Nova Scotia
- Coordinates: 45°55′N 59°59′W
- Country: Canada
- Province: Nova Scotia
- Municipality: Cape Breton Regional Municipality
- English settlement: 1769
- Incorporated Town: 1901
- Amalgamated Cape Breton Regional Municipality: August 1, 1995
- Named for: Louis XIV

Area
  - Land: 3.3 km^{2} (1.3 sq mi)

Population (2021)
  - Total: 825
  - Density: 250.1/km^{2} (648/sq mi)
- Time zone: UTC-4 (Atlantic (AST))
  - Summer (DST): UTC-3 (ADT)
- Area code: 902

Louisbourg is an unincorporated community and former town in Cape Breton Regional Municipality, Nova Scotia.

== History ==
The harbour had been used by European mariners since at least the 1590s, when it was known as English Port and Havre à l'Anglois, the French settlement that dated to 1713. The French military founded the Fortress of Louisbourg in 1713 and its fortified seaport on the southwest part of the harbour, naming it in honour of Louis XIV. They did so by transplanting settlers there from the evacuated Terre-Neuve colony. The fortress was designed as a "major statement" on French commercial and military power in the ongoing rush to colonize North America. The settlement's development therefore took between 10 and 20 percent of France's total colonial budget from c. 1720 to 1740. The settlement was burned the first day the British-American colonial forces landed during the Siege of Louisbourg (1745). The French were terrorized and abandoned the Grand Battery, which the British American colonial forces occupied the following day. It was returned to France in 1748 but recaptured by the British in 1758.

After the capture in 1758, its fortifications were demolished in 1760 and the town-site abandoned by British forces in 1768. A small civilian population continued to live there after the military left.

English settlers subsequently built a small fishing village across the harbour from the abandoned site of the fortress. The village grew slowly with additional Loyalists settlers in the 1780s. The harbour grew more accessible with the construction of the second Louisbourg Lighthouse in 1842 on the site of the original French lighthouse destroyed in 1758. A railway first reached Louisbourg in 1877, but it was poorly built and abandoned after a forest fire. However the arrival of Sydney and Louisburg Railway in 1894 brought heavy volumes of winter coal exports to Louisbourg Harbour's ice-free waters as a winter coal port. The harbour was used by the Canadian government ship Montmagny in 1912 to land bodies from the sinking of the RMS Titanic. In 1913 the Marconi Company established a transatlantic radio transmitting station here.

Incorporated in 1901, the Town of Louisbourg was disincorporated when all municipal units in Cape Breton County were merged into a single tier regional municipality in 1995.

Historical population
Year	Pop.	±%
1941	1,012	—
1951	1,120	+10.7%
1956	1,314	+17.3%
1961	1,417	+7.8%
1981	1,410	−0.5%
1986	1,355	−3.9%
1991	1,373	+1.3%
1996	1,267	−7.7%
2001	1,157	−8.7%
2006	988	−14.6%
2011	946	−4.3%
2006 population adjusted to match 2011 boundaries.

== Name ==
Pronounced "Lewisburg" by its largely English-speaking population, the present community has been identified by slightly different spellings over the years by both locals and visitors. The town was originally spelled Louisburg and several companies, including the Sydney and Louisburg Railway adopted this spelling. On 6 April 1966, the Nova Scotia House of Assembly passed "An Act to Change the Name of the Town of Louisburg" which resulted in the town changing its official name to the original French spelling Louisbourg.

== Demographics ==
In the 2021 census, Louisbourg had a population of 825 living in 377 of its 420 total private dwellings, a change of −5.9% from its 2016 population of 877. With a land area of 3.3 km^{2} (1.3 sq mi), it had a population density of 250.0/km^{2} (647.5/sq mi) in 2021.

== Economy ==
Louisbourg's economy is dominated by the seasonal tourism industry and seafood processing. The depletion of groundfish stocks has negatively affected local fish processing operations in recent decades.

In the 1960s, Parks Canada completed a partial reconstruction of the Fortress of Louisbourg. Today this National Historic Site of Canada is the town's dominant economic engine, employing many residents and attracting thousands of tourists every year. The fortress holds large scale historical reenactments every few years to mark important historical events and attract visitors to the town. The most recent in July 2008, commemorated the 250th anniversary of the first British siege victory over French forces in July 1758. The town's more recent history is preserved at the Sydney and Louisburg Railway Museum located in the restored railway station in the centre of town.

Annually, the community hosts the Louisbourg Crab Fest. A large golf course and residential resort is planned near the community; designed by Nick Faldo, the resort was expected to open in 2010 but development stalled in the recession.

Louisbourg is home to the Louisbourg Playhouse, a theatre company operating in an Elizabethan theatre that was used as a prop in the live-action 1994 Disney film Squanto: A Warrior's Tale.

== Climate ==
Louisbourg experiences a marine influenced humid continental climate (Köppen climate classification Dfb). The highest temperature ever recorded in Louisbourg was 34.0 °C (93 °F) on 2 September 2010 and 15 July 2013. The coldest temperature ever recorded was −26.0 °C (−15 °F) on 18 January 1982.

Climate data for Fortress of Louisbourg, 1981–2010 normals, extremes 1972–present
Month	Jan	Feb	Mar	Apr	May	Jun	Jul	Aug	Sep	Oct	Nov	Dec	Year
Record high °C (°F)	14.0 (57.2)	13.0 (55.4)	26.0 (78.8)	19.0 (66.2)	29.0 (84.2)	31.7 (89.1)	34.0 (93.2)	32.0 (89.6)	34.0 (93.2)	25.0 (77.0)	20.0 (68.0)	13.5 (56.3)	34.0 (93.2)
Mean daily maximum °C (°F)	−1.0 (30.2)	−1.1 (30.0)	1.4 (34.5)	5.6 (42.1)	11.0 (51.8)	16.4 (61.5)	20.3 (68.5)	21.4 (70.5)	18.3 (64.9)	12.5 (54.5)	7.0 (44.6)	2.3 (36.1)	9.5 (49.1)
Daily mean °C (°F)	−4.9 (23.2)	−5.2 (22.6)	−2.2 (28.0)	2.2 (36.0)	6.9 (44.4)	11.9 (53.4)	16.2 (61.2)	17.6 (63.7)	14.3 (57.7)	8.9 (48.0)	3.8 (38.8)	−1.1 (30.0)	5.7 (42.3)
Mean daily minimum °C (°F)	−8.9 (16.0)	−9.3 (15.3)	−5.9 (21.4)	−1.3 (29.7)	2.7 (36.9)	7.4 (45.3)	12.2 (54.0)	13.8 (56.8)	10.3 (50.5)	5.2 (41.4)	0.6 (33.1)	−4.5 (23.9)	1.9 (35.4)
Record low °C (°F)	−26.0 (−14.8)	−25.0 (−13.0)	−23.0 (−9.4)	−13.5 (7.7)	−7.0 (19.4)	−1.5 (29.3)	4.0 (39.2)	3.5 (38.3)	−1.7 (28.9)	−4.5 (23.9)	−12.0 (10.4)	−20.6 (−5.1)	−26.0 (−14.8)
Average precipitation mm (inches)	147.0 (5.79)	138.0 (5.43)	143.6 (5.65)	147.5 (5.81)	127.6 (5.02)	113.1 (4.45)	108.4 (4.27)	107.8 (4.24)	133.0 (5.24)	158.3 (6.23)	168.9 (6.65)	153.1 (6.03)	1,646.3 (64.81)
Average rainfall mm (inches)	83.4 (3.28)	77.9 (3.07)	100.1 (3.94)	127.9 (5.04)	126.9 (5.00)	113.1 (4.45)	108.4 (4.27)	107.8 (4.24)	133.0 (5.24)	158.3 (6.23)	160.7 (6.33)	106.3 (4.19)	1,403.6 (55.26)
Average snowfall cm (inches)	58.5 (23.0)	56.6 (22.3)	41.2 (16.2)	17.9 (7.0)	0.8 (0.3)	0.0 (0.0)	0.0 (0.0)	0.0 (0.0)	0.0 (0.0)	0.0 (0.0)	8.2 (3.2)	44.6 (17.6)	227.8 (89.7)
Average precipitation days (≥ 0.2 mm)	15.4	13.3	13.7	15.3	15.2	14.0	13.9	14.3	15.2	16.8	18.9	17.8	183.8
Average rainy days (≥ 0.2 mm)	8.3	7.2	9.6	13.6	15.1	14.0	13.9	14.3	15.2	16.8	17.5	11.9	157.3
Average snowy days (≥ 0.2 cm)	9.3	8.0	6.3	3.1	0.24	0.0	0.0	0.0	0.0	0.0	2.2	8.0	37.1
Mean monthly sunshine hours	89.9	109.0	138.4	150.7	170.7	185.5	184.7	182.1	159.8	130.9	74.9	74.2	1,650.7
Percentage possible sunshine	31.9	37.3	37.5	37.2	36.9	39.5	38.8	41.6	42.4	38.6	26.2	27.4	36.3
Source: Environment Canada

== In popular culture ==
Louisbourg (spelled Louisberg) was mentioned in Nathaniel Hawthorne's story Feathertop. The town is also a major setting for Thomas H. Raddall's 1946 novel Roger Sudden. The town "Louisburg" is mentioned in Henry Wadsworth Longfellow's Evangeline. The 2011 film Take This Waltz begins with a re-enactment scene from the fortress and features the lighthouse in several shots.

== See also ==
- Fortress of Louisbourg
- Royal eponyms in Canada
