= Dominion Steel and Coal Corporation =

Canadian corporation (1928–1968)

- Founded: 1 January 1928
- Defunct: 27 December 1968
- Fate: Acquired by Sidbec
- Successor: Sidbec-Dosco Limited
- Headquarters: Montreal, Quebec
- Parent: Avro Canada (1957–62); Hawker Siddeley Canada (1962–68)

The Dominion Steel and Coal Corporation, Limited, known commonly as Dosco, was a Canadian coal mining and steel manufacturing company. Incorporated in 1928 and operational by 1930, DOSCO was predated by the British Empire Steel Corporation (BESCO), which was a merger of the Dominion Coal Company, the Dominion Iron and Steel Company and the Nova Scotia Steel Company. DOSCO was one of the largest private employers in Canada during the 1930s–1950s. In 1957, DOSCO was acquired by Avro Canada, which in 1962 became Hawker Siddeley Canada.

In 1965, Dosco began losing money and the parent company started to liquidate its operations. In 1966 Dosco sold its iron mines to the Newfoundland government and its hydroelectric operations to Nova Scotia Power. The following year it sold its steel to the Nova Scotia government, which created the Sydney Steel Corporation and later in 1968 Lester Pearson's minority government created Cape Breton Development Corporation to take over the coal operations. In December 1968, the corporation, whose sole remaining property was the steel mill at Contrecoeur, was acquired by Sidbec. Subsequently, Dosco was renamed Sidbec-Dosco and continued as a subsidiary of Sidbec. In 1997, the company was acquired by Ispat and renamed Ispat Sidbec, then was renamed Mittal Canada in 2005 and ArcelorMittal Montréal in 2008.

The original legal entity from 1928, which was a Nova Scotia corporation number 1002023, remained in existence until 4 March 2016. At the time it was cancelled, it was called ArcelorMittal Montréal Inc. In 2016, it was imported to federal jurisdiction and merged into ArcelorMittal Canada Inc.

== Corporate predecessors ==
Industrial Cape Breton consisted of two distinctive geographic regions for industrial activity: the "north side" of Sydney Harbour, and the "south side". The north side was dominated in the 1800s by the General Mining Association (GMA), which had been formed in the 1820s after the Colony of Cape Breton Island was amalgamated back into Nova Scotia. Several independent collieries opened on the south side and by the 1870s, Canada's federal government had implemented its National Policy of economic protectionist measures. It was during this decade that the leading operators on the "south side" foresaw the benefits of amalgamating and modernizing to replace lost American coal markets in eastern Canada with Cape Breton coal.

=== Dominion Coal Company ===
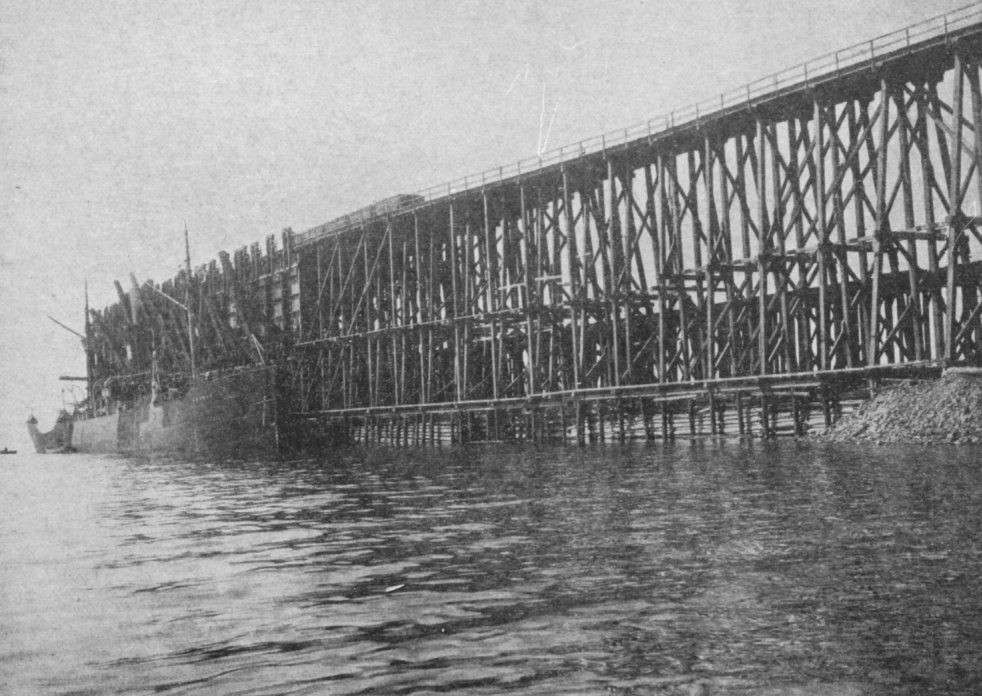
Coal pier in Sydney, c. 1900

In 1889, Henry Melville Whitney and Frederick Stark Pearson of Boston, Massachusetts, formed the Whitney coal syndicate with Benjamin Franklin Pearson of the People's Heat and Light Company of Halifax, Nova Scotia. The group purchased one mine and obtained options on others south of Sydney on eastern Cape Breton Island. Premier William Stevens Fielding and the Liberal provincial administration favored Whitney's entry into the coal business because his steamships and street-railway electric generators consumed large quantities of coal. The Whitney syndicate was offered an unprecedented 99-year lease on a fixed royalty; the group exercised its options, acquiring most of the existing bituminous coal mines in eastern Cape Breton and co-opting such local figures as John Stewart McLennan and David MacKeen. This process took some months, and Whitney was not ready to consolidate operations at Sydney until early 1893.

On February 1, 1893, Dominion Coal Company Ltd. (DOMCO) was incorporated with Whitney as president, B.F. Whitney as secretary and F.S. Pearson as chief engineer. Early investors in the enterprise included Whitney's younger brother, William Collins Whitney; his brothers-in-law, Henry F. Dimock and Charles T. Barney; and Almeric H. Paget, who later married William's daughter Pauline.

=== Properties ===
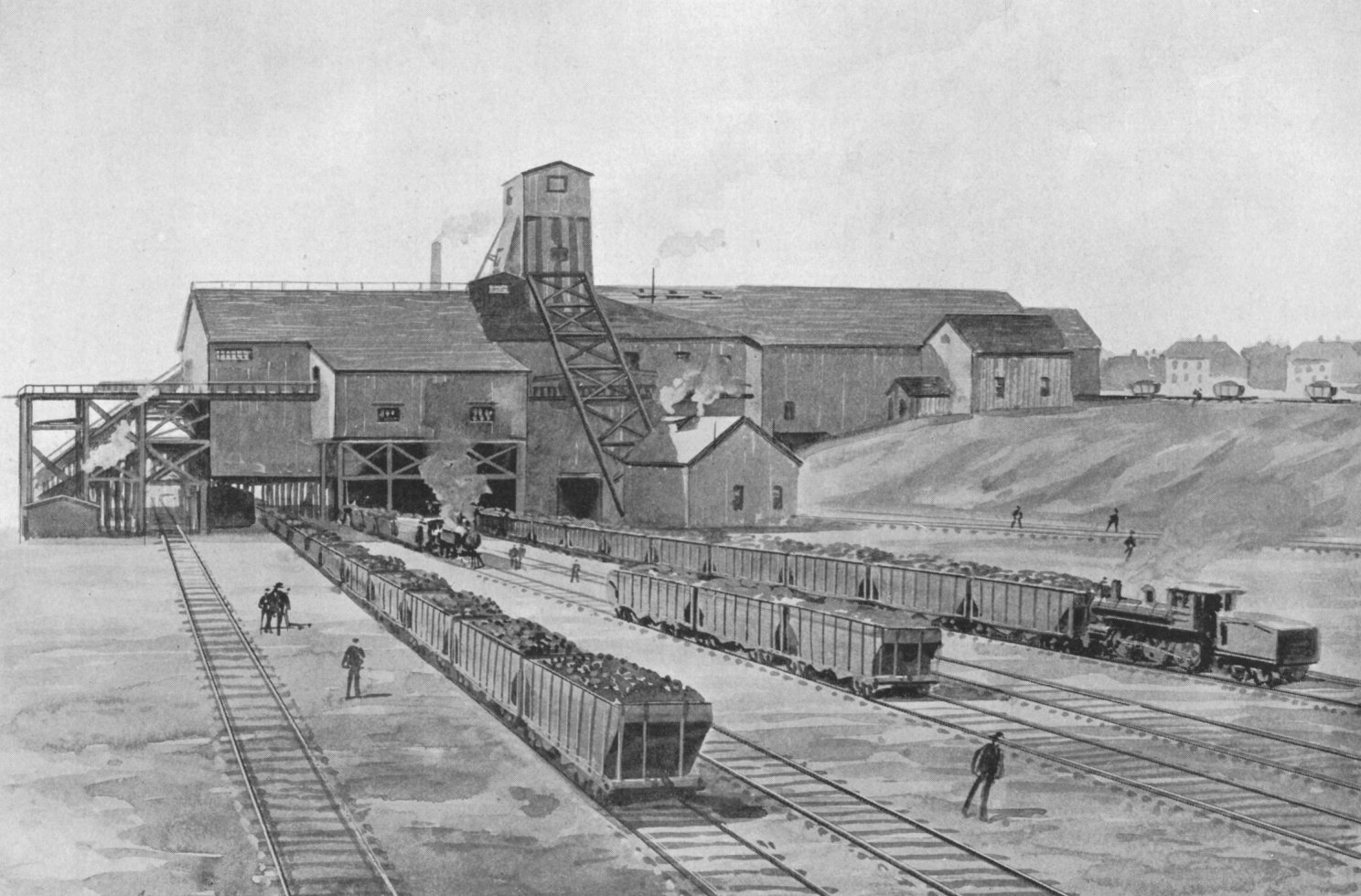
A Dominion Coal Company colliery in Reserve Mines, Nova Scotia, c. 1900. This mine would become one of numerous assets of the Dominion Steel and Coal Corporation upon its founding in 1928 through corporate acquisitions.

The new company included the following properties:

- Gowrie
- Schooner Pond
- Clyde
- Glace Bay
- Caledonia
- Reserve
- Lorway
- Emery
- International
- Bridgeport
- Gardiner
- Lingan
- Victoria
- and several smaller collieries

=== Railway lines ===
DOMCO also inherited a mixed variety of railway lines linking the various mines. These were consolidated and operated as a department of the company, and in 1895 were extended south to Louisbourg. The railroad lines were incorporated in 1910 as the Sydney and Louisburg Railway.

By 1912, DOMCO operated 16 collieries, comprising 40% of Canada's coal production. The company effected numerous efficiencies and improvements. There were, however, costly mistakes, prominent among them the tendency to become locked into low-price contracts (such as to Whitney's companies), thus missing a large market at higher prices. By 1901 some 90 percent of its output was committed to such low-price contracts. The company made a large public offering of stock, which tumbled in price when Whitney failed to get the American import duty on coal removed or at least reduced.

=== Dominion Iron and Steel Company ===
Flushed with the success of creating DOMCO in the 1890s, the Whitney syndicate sought to create a use for "slack coal" resulting from mixing and screening processes at DOMCO's coal wash plants. Whitney expanded operations at Sydney with the organization in March 1899 of the Dominion Iron & Steel Company Ltd. (DISCO), which had funding in both Canada and the United States. Whitney was joined in the new enterprise by his long-time business friends F.S. Pearson, B.F. Pearson, W.C. Whitney, C.T. Barney, H.F. Dimock, A.H. Paget and J.S. McLennan. The promise of federal bounties, together with concessions from the Liberal provincial administration of Premier George Henry Murray, enabled DISCO to begin work in June 1899 on the largest integrated steel mill in the British Empire. Located on the south side of Sydney Harbour, which Whitney said offered more advantages to steel making than anywhere else in the world, the mill was completed in 1901.

DISCO operated coke ovens which cooked this slack coal to create coke to fuel its oxygen blast furnaces that were used to smelt iron ore mined by DISCO at its mines at various locations including magnetite-hematite at Austin Brook and hematite on Bell Island in Newfoundland, and shipped to Sydney.

Competitors in Britain, France, Germany and the United States were initially concerned. However, continuing problems of management and cost control led to Whitney's early withdrawal from the project. Later in 1901, Whitney and his associates sold majority control of DOMCO to engineer turned businessman James Ross of Montreal, and their minority share of DISCO to Ross and other Canadian interests. Whitney resigned as president of DISCO in 1902 and as a member of the DOMCO board in December 1909; he remained a member of the DISCO board until 1909.

The year 1901 also saw further changes in the coal and steel industry on Cape Breton Island when the rival GMA, operator of coal mines on the "north side" of Sydney Harbour, as well as a newly inaugurated steel mill at that location, sold its properties to Nova Scotia Steel Company Ltd. (SCOTIA) of New Glasgow.

In 1903, Ross and the Canadian investors in DISCO sold control to James H. Plummer of Toronto, Ontario. By 1910, Plummer gained control of DOMCO from Ross and made both DOMCO and DISCO subsidiary companies of a new entity called Dominion Steel Corporation, which also counted mainland Nova Scotia's Cumberland Railway and Coal Company as a subsidiary.

DISCO Presidents and General Managers, 1899–1919

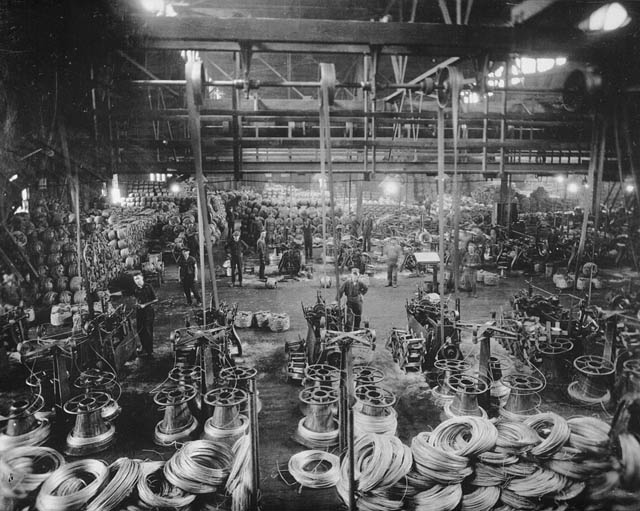
Sydney wire mill

Presidents

- Henry Melville Whitney 1899–1902
- James Ross 1902–1904
- James Henry Plummer 1904–1916
- Mark Workman 1916–1919

General managers

- John Stewart McLennan 1899–1900
- Arthur James Moxham 1900–1902
- David Baker 1902–1904
- Graham Fraser 1904–1906
- F.P. Jones 1906–1910
- M.J. Butler 1910–1916
- D.H. McDougall 1916–1919

=== British Empire Steel Corporation ===
Further consolidation of industrial activity on Cape Breton Island saw SCOTIA taken over in 1917 by American investors as its steel mill had closed in 1914, and the company focused on coal mining in Sydney Mines and manufactured steel products at its extensive facilities in Trenton, Pictou County.

The fall-out from World War I saw a syndicate of British investors led by Montreal, Quebec industrialist Roy M. Wolvin negotiate a takeover of Dominion Steel Corporation from Plummer in 1919. BESCO proposed a $500 million merger of DOMCO and DISCO, along with various British steel and shipbuilding interests. In 1921, SCOTIA was merged with the conglomerate to form the British Empire Steel Corporation (BESCO).

The scope and scale of BESCO was truly mind-boggling. In addition to its coal mines and steel mills operating as a complete monopoly across the entire Sydney Coal Field, BESCO also operated coal mines, steel mills and foundries in the Pictou Coal Field in Trenton, New Glasgow, Stellarton and Westville, as well as North America's deepest coal mines in Springhill, Nova Scotia, and iron mines in Bell Island, Newfoundland. It also operated several industrial railways and various shipping ports throughout the province. It also operated company stores, a controversial form of servicing its employees.

However, the mergers that resulted in the formation of BESCO also amalgamated an inordinate amount of debt. During its 8-year history, BESCO was in a constant financial crisis and by 1925 required an annual operating profit of $8 million ($100 million when adjusted for inflation in 2010) to meet these financial commitments. As a result, BESCO's investors pressured management to force many difficult working conditions in order to achieve higher production from its workforce. This resulted in unprecedented labour unrest and militancy, which would forever transform Industrial Cape Breton (see Davis Day).

Profits fell and coal and steel markets were declining throughout the 1920s as North America's industrial and consumer practices changed. BESCO management tried to desperately save the company, however bitter strikes by workers, culminating in widespread social and civil unrest in 1925, saw BESCO slip further into debt.

BESCO subsidiary DISCO (the steel mill) fell into receivership in the spring of 1926 after short-term financing was refused; this would eventually lead to the break-up of the conglomerate. DISCO was liquidated in 1927 but the Supreme Court of Nova Scotia refused to dissolve BESCO. Wolvin resigned as president and sold his holdings after his reorganization plan was rejected by other shareholders and he was succeeded by C.B. McNaught.

== Creation of DOSCO ==
In 1928 a new holding company called Dominion Steel and Coal Corporation (also DOSCO) was formed as a holding company by McNaught and various BESCO investors. In May 1930 BESCO was dissolved and the new company took over its industrial properties. DOSCO implemented management processes that put a halt to the financial troubles through the 1930s. The company's fortunes were boosted by World War II with its control of manufacturing and their inputs and at one point DOSCO was the largest private employer in the nation.

Following the war, DOSCO's industrial prominence continued to slide as alternative fuels and sources for steel took force, combining with declines in government subsidization of both industries. In 1957, A.V. Roe Canada acquired a controlling interest in DOSCO in a bid to diversify its operations beyond the aircraft manufacturing and defence industries. In 1958, DOSCO subsidiary Cumberland Railway and Coal Company closed its coal mines in Springhill; the mines being closed following the Springhill Mining Disaster. The associated railway service limped on until permission to abandon was granted in 1961, and the last train ran in 1962. The Cumberland Railway continued to exist as a corporation, however, as the S&L was made its subsidiary in 1961, doing business as the Sydney & Louisburg Division of the Cumberland Railway. This was done primarily to make the provincially chartered S&L eligible for federal railway subsidies.

In 1962 A.V. Roe Canada was dissolved and its assets merged into the newly formed conglomerate Hawker Siddeley Canada, which sought to rid itself of money-losing operations.

By the early 1960s DOSCO was in a continuous slide and sought to halt its decline by shutting various poorly performing mines in the Pictou and Sydney coal fields; from 9 in 1960 to 5 in 1965. Despite shedding other money-losing subsidiaries it was still losing money and under pressure from Hawker Siddeley Canada to reduce red ink. In 1965, DOSCO announced that its remaining mines had only 15 years of production left and it would not undertake any further capital expenditures and would exit the industry within months.

The vast public outcry to DOSCO's announcement in Industrial Cape Breton saw the minority government of Prime Minister Lester Pearson come under incredible political pressure to resolve the crisis. Pearson announced the formation of the Donald Commission of inquiry into the industry, which would eventually lead to the formation of the federal Crown corporation Cape Breton Development Corporation (or DEVCO) and the provincial Crown corporation Sydney Steel Corporation (SYSCO) which expropriated DOSCO's mines and steel mill in 1968.

== DOSCO subsidiaries ==
Refer to: Industrial Heritage of Cape Breton Island.

- Acadia Coal Company Limited, Stellarton, NS
- Aluminum Industries Limited, Montreal, QC
- Canadian Bridge Company Limited, Walkerville, ON
- Canadian Bridge Engineering Company Limited, Walkerville, ON
- Canadian Steel Corporation Limited, Ojibway, ON
- Canadian Steel Lands Limited, Ojibway, ON
- Canadian Transmission Tower Company Limited, Montreal, QC
- Canadian Tube and Steel Products Limited, Montreal, QC
- Cibou Steamship Company Limited, London, UK
- Dominion Coal Company, Glace Bay, NS
  - Dominion Coal Import Company Limited, Montreal, QC
  - Dominion Rolling Stock Company Limited, Sydney, NS
  - Cumberland Railway and Coal Company, Springhill, NS
  - Sydney and Louisburg Railway Company, Glace Bay, NS
- Dominion Iron and Steel Company, Sydney, NS
- Dominion Limestone Limited, Aguathuna
- Dominion Shipping Company Limited, Sydney, NS
- Dominion Wabana Ore Limited, Bell Island, NL
- DOSCO Overseas Engineering Limited, Beaconsfield, UK
- Empire Housing Company Limited, Sydney, NS
- Essex Terminal Railway Company, Walkerville, ON
- Eastern Car Company Limited, Trenton, NS
- Graham Nail & Wire Products Limited, Toronto, ON
- Halifax Shipyards Limited, Halifax, NS
- Nova Scotia Steel and Coal Company Limited, Trenton, NS
- Old Sydney Collieries Limited, Sydney Mines, NS
- James Pender & Company, Saint John, NB
- Scotia Rolling Stock Company Limited, Trenton, NS
- Seaboard Power Corporation Limited, Glace Bay, NS
- Stothert & Pitt (Canada) Limited, Montreal, QC
- Stowell Screw Company Limited, Longueuil, QC
- Trenton Industries Limited, Trenton, NS
- Trenton Steel Works Limited, Trenton, NS
- Truscon Steel Company of Canada Limited, Walkerville, ON

== Leadership ==
=== President ===
1. Charles Boyd McNaught, 1 January 1928 – 24 February 1932
2. Sir Newton James Moore, 24 February 1932 – 11 September 1936
3. Arthur Cross, 11 September 1936 – 31 December 1947
4. Charles Benjamin Lang, 1 January 1948 – 31 December 1949
5. Lionel Avard Forsyth, 1 January 1950 – 1 January 1957 †
6. Charles Benjamin Lang, 15 April 1957 – 1 November 1957
7. Crawford Gordon Jr., 1 November 1957 – 18 February 1959
8. Albert Langley Fairley Jr., 18 February 1959 – 31 May 1964
9. Theodore Jonathan Emmert, 1 June 1964 – 27 December 1968

=== Chairman of the Board ===
1. Charles Boyd McNaught, 24 February 1932 – 16 September 1934 †
2. Arthur Cross, 1 January 1948 – 31 December 1949
3. Charles Benjamin Lang, 1 January 1950 – 1 November 1957
4. Sir Roy Hardy Dobson, 1 November 1957 – 3 May 1963
5. Theodore Jonathan Emmert, 3 May 1963 – 27 December 1968

== See also ==
- Dominion, Nova Scotia
- Black Diamond Steamship Company
