= Coal in Canada =

Coal reserves in Canada rank 13th largest in the world (following the former Soviet Union, the United States, the People's Republic of China and Australia) at approximately 10 billion tons, 0.6% of the world total.The coal industry generated $12.2 billion in 2023. With 19 active coal mines across Canada, most of the coal comes from British Columbia (59%), Alberta (28%) and Saskatchewan (13%).

In 2005, Canada produced 67.3 million tons of coal and its consumption was 60 million tons. Of this 56 million tons were used for electricity generation. The remaining four million tons was used in the steel, concrete and other industries. The largest consumers of coal in Canada were Alberta and Ontario. In 1997, Alberta accounted for 47% of Canada's coal consumption at 26.2 million tons, and Ontario accounted for 25% at 13.8 million tons. Saskatchewan, Manitoba, Nova Scotia and New Brunswick also use coal to generate electricity to varying degrees.

In 2016, The Government of Canada, with the support of all provinces except Manitoba and Saskatchewan, decided to phase out the use of coal-fired power plants by 2030 in order to meet its Paris climate agreement commitments as declared in the Pan-Canadian Framework on Clean Growth and Climate Change. The decision affected 50 communities dependent on a nearby coal mine or power plant for its economy, and 3,000 to 3,900 workers who worked in the 13 power stations and nine nearby mines that were still active in 2016 across Alberta, Saskatchewan, New Brunswick and Nova Scotia. In November 2017, the Government of Canada co-founded the Powering Past Coal Alliance. Between 2000 and 2025, Canada reduced its coal power capacity by 83%.

== Overview ==
Canada exports both the higher and lower grades of coal—metallurgical coal and thermal coal. According to a February 2015 Natural Resources Canada report, in 2013, "Canadian coal exports totalled $5.5 billion." Ninety-three percent of coal exports were the higher-grade coking coal. In 2013 there were only two coal mines in Canada producing the lower grade thermal coal for export—Westmoreland Coal Company's Coal Valley and Hillsborough Resources Limited's Quinsam mine. A third thermal coal for export mining project—the Vista Coal Project in northern Alberta—had received regulatory approval in the 1980s, and again in 2014, but the price of thermal coal had dropped dramatically from 2011 to 2014 and the project stalled. The project was revived in 2015 when American billionaire coal investor purchased Vista. Thermal coal was exported from Vista in 2019.

For several years, coal production decreased as provincial and federal governments sought to phase out its use in favour of renewable energy in order to combat global warming.

By 2018, there was an increase global coal prices and improvements in thermal coal mining, which led to an increase in coal mining activity. Most of Canada's coal reserves are located in Alberta.

In 2010, Canada ranked 15th in the world in coal production, with a total production of 67.9 million tonnes.

Coal was first mined in Canada in 1639 when the first mine was opened in Grand Lake, New Brunswick. First Nations would identify deposits, and the mined product would be used for tasks such as burning and trading. During the New France period, a large mine was built in Cow Bay, Nova Scotia on Cape Breton Island to supply to Louisbourg fortress.

== Background ==
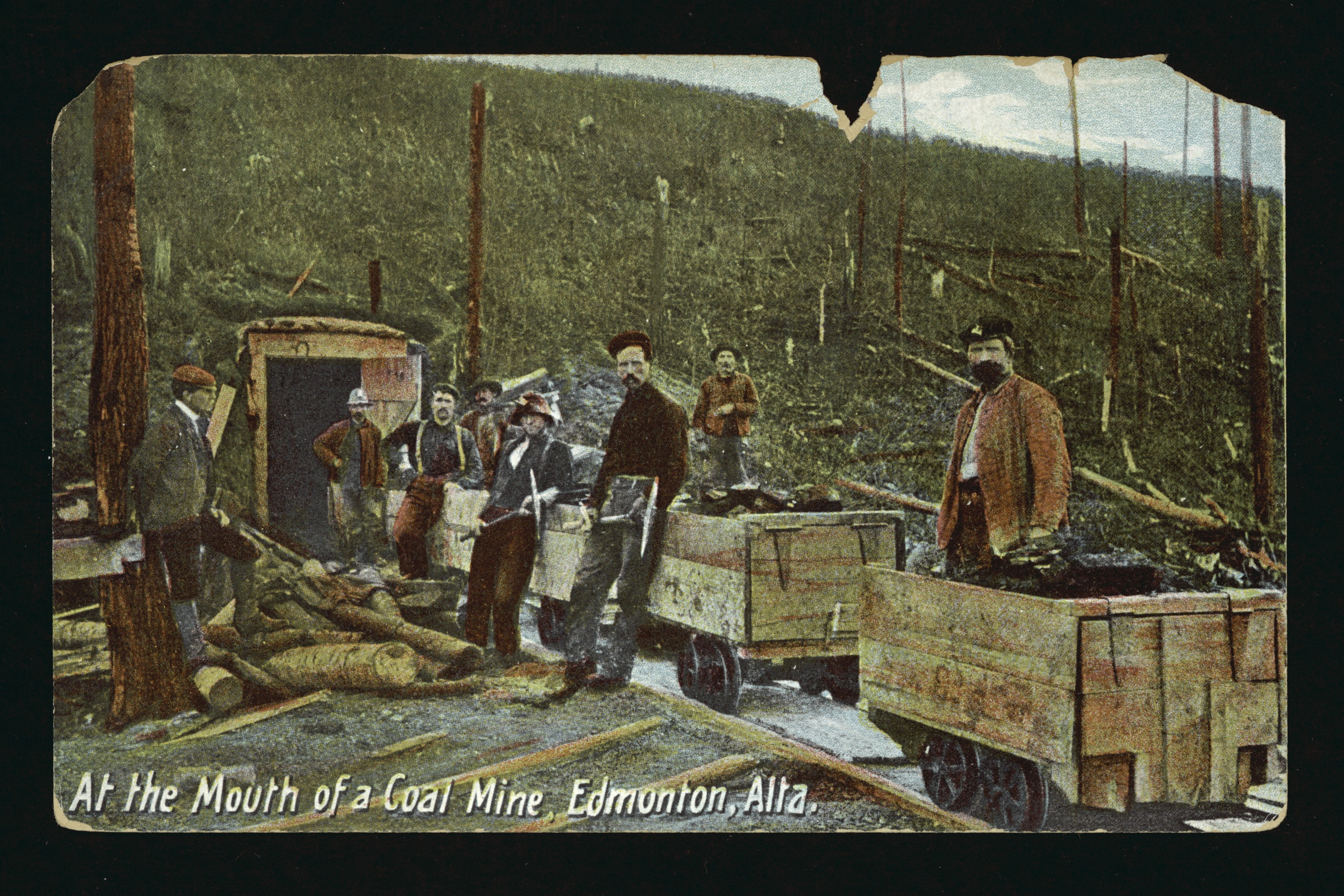
A group of miners outside the entrance of a coal mine in Edmonton, Alberta around 1910

In the late 18th century, industrial mining begun in Canada, which helped propel Canada's industrialization. Infrastructure for its transportation and shipping was built. Cape Breton supplied Boston and other American ports in Coal and had 21 coal mines by 1871, but they were all abandoned in the early 20th century.

In Western Canada, coal was first mined on Vancouver Island in the mid-19th century. The development of the Canadian Pacific railway led to mines being built in towns along its route in Alberta. By 1911, Western Canada was producing most of the country's coal, and Alberta was the country's largest producing province.

Working in Canadian coal mines was very dangerous. Deadly mine disasters occurred in multiple locations, including Hillcrest, Alberta and Springhill, Nova Scotia. Harsh working conditions in Coal mines and coal-powered factories led to the establishment of Canada's trade union movement. Major coal strikes occurred in Cape Breton in the 1920s and Estevan, Saskatchewan in the 1930s.

Following the Second World War, economic sectors that previously used coal such as domestic heating, industrial energy, and transportation energy started using petroleum. However, Canada's coal production remained relevant due to the exportation of metallurgical coal to Japan. Following the 1970s energy crisis, Canada's coal production grew rapidly as it became more cost-competitive and new export markets emerged in other Asian countries.

== Economic impact ==
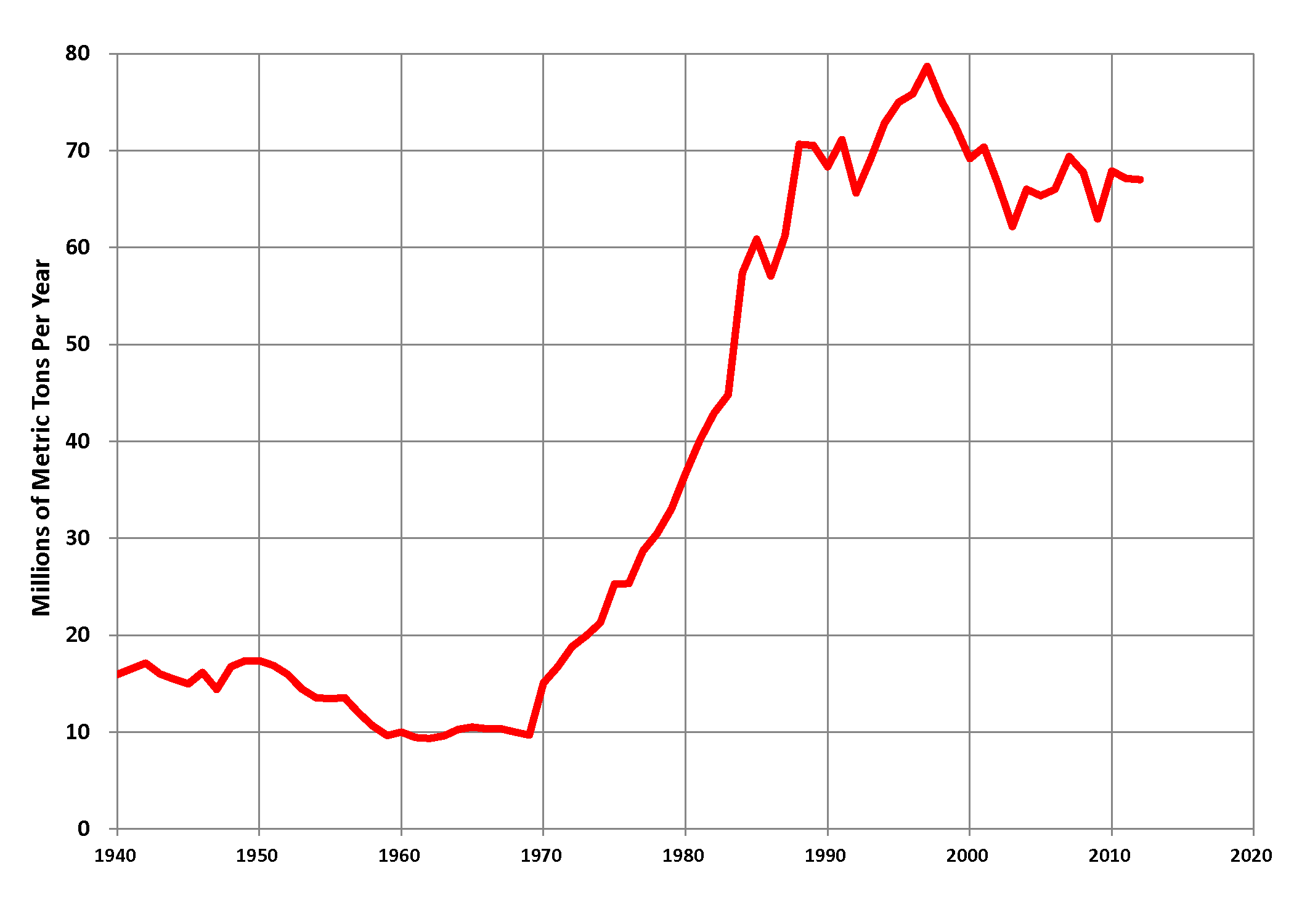
Coal production in Canada, 1940–2012

In 2016, "mining, processing, and related services from thermal and metallurgical coal contributed an estimated $4 billion to Canada's economy, or roughly 0,2%. of Canada's GDP," according to Natural Resources Canada. NRC reported that about 50 percent of this "GDP contribution came from metallurgical coal" and, in comparison, "clean energy accounted for 1.3% of Canada's GDP."

== Coal in Alberta ==
In 2018, coal mining in Alberta accounted for $10 million in royalties for the province, according to Alberta Energy's Coal and Mineral Development Unit's "2018 Year in Review". In 2018, Alberta's coal production totaled approximately 20 million tonnes. Coal production had reached a peak 2016−approximately 25 million tonnes, representing about $20 million in royalties.

Coal sequences in Alberta originated approximately 140 and 65 million years ago. The collision between the two immense plates had pushed up the Rocky Mountains while depressing the North American continent's interior. New layers of growth crushed and buried layers of peat, shale, and sandstone, compressing them into coal beds. The oldest coal deposits were pushed closer to the surface about 80 to 55 million years ago, forming part of the Rocky Mountains's foothills and Front Ranges.

The coal beds that lie under the prairies are of an inferior, impure grade, which is not capable of firing blast furnaces essential to steel-making. The Coalspur Formation in the Western Canada Sedimentary Basin in the foothills of southwestern Alberta, has large quantities of high-quality coal. The Coalspur Formation runs from south of the Wapiti River to the North Saskatchewan River. The Coalspur coal zone is about 120 metres (390 ft) to 200 metres (660 ft) thick.

The Siksika —Blackfoot and the Kainai—Blood people, called an area on the banks of the Oldman River the Sik-ooh-kotoki or "place of the black rocks." This was the site of the first commercial coal mine, opened in 1874 by an entrepreneur from New York City.

In 1793, Hudson's Bay Company surveyor Peter Fidler identified a seam of high-quality coal near the Red Deer River.

In 1882, a large mine became operational, leading to the formation of towns, such as Coalbanks, now known as Lethbridge, then Coaldale, Coalhurst, and Black Diamond.

In 1976, the Progressive Conservative government under then Premier Peter Lougheed restricted open-pit mines in most of Alberta's Rocky Mountains and Foothills through the Coal Development Policy. Alberta's last open pit mine closed in 1983.

In 2016, then NDP Premier Rachel Notley announced the elimination of all coal-fired power stations in the province by 2030.

Coal mines closed in the Crowsnest Pass, Canmore, Nordegg, and Grande Cache, among others.

By 2020, coal-fired power stations in operation in Alberta included the Battle River, Genesee, H.R. Milner, Keephills, Sheerness, and Sundance stations.

According to Alberta Energy's 2018 ' Review, there was an increase in bituminous coal mining activity following a decrease for several years. In 2018, mining operations have restarted, new greenfield operations began, and new mining projects were proposed. According to the Review two major factors contributed to the increase in coal mining activity−an increase in global coal prices and recent improvements in thermal coal. By 2019, the Grande Cache mine reopened.

As of June 2024, Alberta had phased out all coal-fired electrical generation, with the remaining plants converting over to natural gas generation.

== Coal in British Columbia ==
In 2019, coal sales reached $5.08 billion US, making coal the province's "most valuable mined commodity". About 85% of B.C.'s coal is a higher grade of coal, known as metallurgical coal or coking coal. It is used to produce good-quality coke. which is essential in blast furnaces used to make steel from iron ore. Most coal from British Columbia mines is exported on the international markets through coal ports near Vancouver or Prince Rupert.

Major coals mine fields in the province include a field in the Kootenay Mountains in southeastern B.C., and Peace coalfields in northeastern B.C. British Columbia's largest producing coal field is in Elk Valley (British Columbia), which is located in the Kootenay Mountains, about 60 kilometres from the borders of Montana and Alberta. It has had operational coal mines for over a century. By 2020, Teck Resources owned all five coal mines in that region including Elkford Operations, an open-pit mine just west of the Alberta border with British Columbia.

== Transition to natural gas, nuclear, and renewables ==
In 2003, the McGuinty government of Ontario set a goal of closing all coal-fired power stations, to be replaced with healthier and more environmentally-friendly energy sources. As part of the coal phase-out, the provincial government agreed for Bruce Power to refurbish units 1 and 2 of Bruce A of the Bruce Nuclear Generating Station to replace lost generating capacity. According to a 2014 article, long-term health problems caused by coal made it twice as expensive as wind energy. The OPG Atikokan Generating Station, coal-fired power generation plant, which had been in operation for 27 years, was shut down in 2012. Work on a $170 million biomass conversion project—the first biomass conversion project in Ontario, was undertaken at that time. It was anticipated that the project would "create 200 construction jobs and help protect existing jobs at the plant" and provide "new economic opportunities for Ontario's forestry sector, which will provide the biomass fuel to the plant". As part of Ontario's phase out of coal-fired electricity generation, the Thunder Bay Generating Station (TBGS)—the final coal plant in Ontario—stopped burning coal in April 2014. The TBGS underwent a biomass conversion to run on advanced biomass—wood pellets. It was recommissioned on 9 February 2015.

In 2016, the Government of Alberta announced the elimination of all coal-fired power stations in the province by 2030. The Government of New Brunswick made the same announcement the following year. Also in 2016, the government of Canada announced the goal of phasing out the use of coal-fired power stations across the country in favour of less polluting alternatives for electricity generation by 2030. In response, companies such as TransAlta and Capital Power began planning the conversion of their coal-fired power stations to burning natural gas.

== List of coal-fired power stations ==
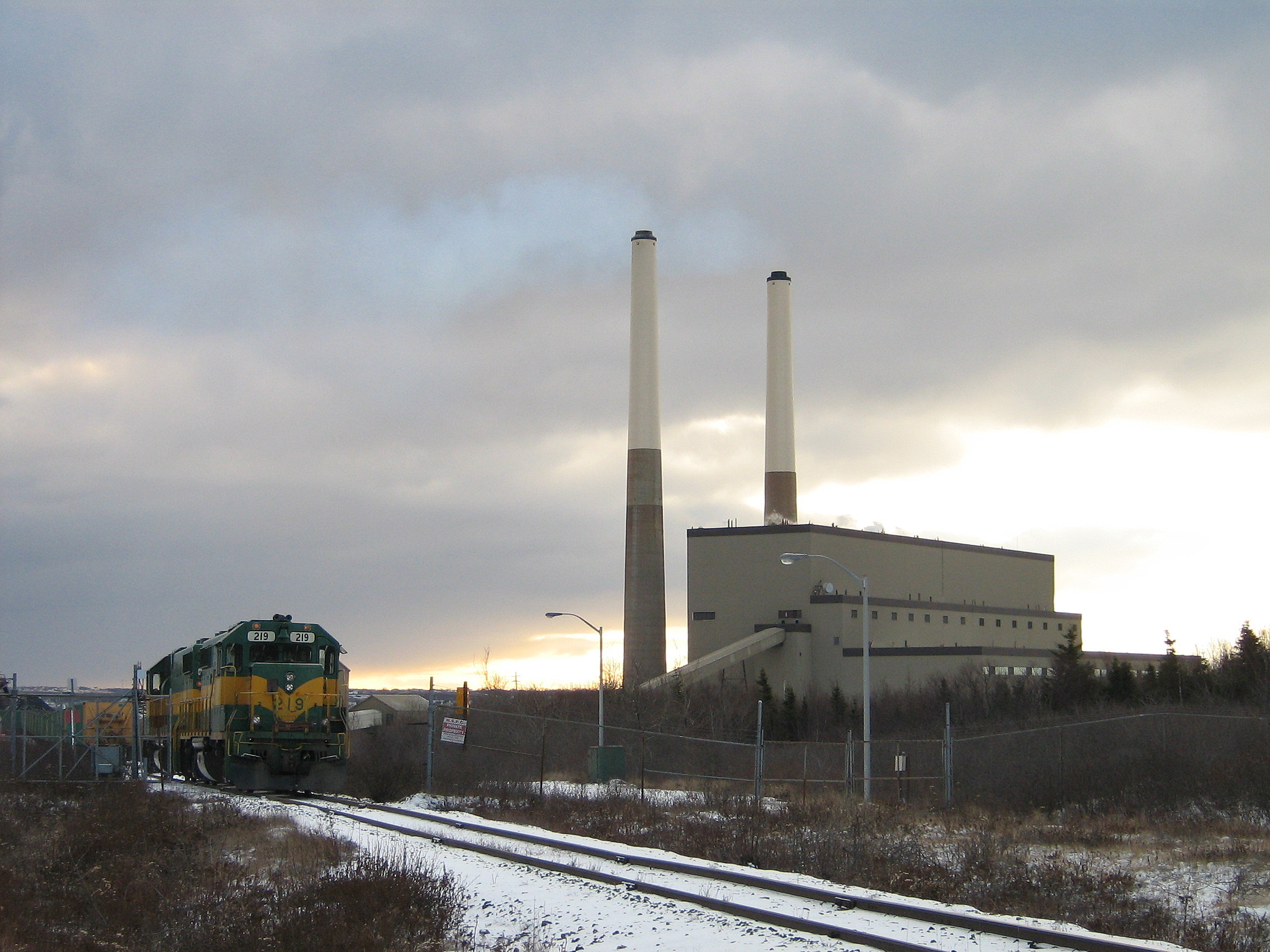
Lingan Generating Station, the largest coal-fired power station in Eastern Canada

Only eight operational coal-fired power stations remained as of June 2024 in Canada.

Name	Province	Coordinates	Capacity (MW)	Owner	Fuel type	Retirement	Ref
Belledune	New Brunswick	47°54′21″N 65°51′48″W	458	NB Power	Coal	2030	
Boundary Dam	Saskatchewan	49°5′47″N 103°1′49″W	672	SaskPower	Lignite	TBD (Note: Unit 3 will continue to operate as normal as it has carbon capture technology installed. Units 4 and 5 will be retired by 2022 and 2025, respectively. Unit 6 will either have carbon capture technology installed or be decommissioned at an unknown date.)	
Lingan	Nova Scotia	46°14′12″N 60°2′14″W	632.8	Nova Scotia Power	Coal	2030 conversion to Number 6 fuel oil	
Point Aconi	Nova Scotia	46°19′18″N 60°19′48″W	165	Nova Scotia Power	Coke (53%); Coal (47%)	2029 shutdown	
Point Tupper	Nova Scotia	45°35′13″N 61°20′53″W	148	Nova Scotia Power	Coal	2029 conversion to natural gas	
Poplar River	Saskatchewan	49°3′27″N 105°28′59″W	582	SaskPower	Lignite	2030	
Shand	Saskatchewan	49°5′16″N 102°51′49″W	276	SaskPower	Coal	2030 (Note: Installation of carbon capture technology by 2024 would allow the power station to operate until its originally planned decommissioning of 2042.)	
Trenton	Nova Scotia	45°37′13″N 62°38′53″W	305	Nova Scotia Power	Coal	2029 shutdown	

== List of decommissioned coal-fired power stations ==
List of former electrical generating facilities in Canada that were coal fueled. Only facilities that have permanently shut down all of their electricity generating units are included.

Name	Province	Location	Capacity (MW)	Fuel type	Owner	In commission	Decommission date	Smokestack configuration
Battle River Generating Station	Alberta	52.468889°N 112.133889°W	56	Coal	Heartland Generation		1998	
Dalhousie	New Brunswick	48.051919°N 66.370770°W	315	Coal	NB Power	1967	2012	167 m (551 ft) & 162 m (532 ft)
Grand Lake Generating Station	New Brunswick	46.057244°N 66.005067°W	57	Coal	NB Power	1931	2010	78 m
Flavin's Lane	Newfoundland and Labrador	47.568633°N 52.708150°W	0.186	Coal	St. John's Electric Light Co.	17 October 1885	8 July 1892	10 m (32 ft) ×1
Genesee	Alberta	53°20′35″N 114°18′11″W	1,286	Coal (81%); Natural gas (19%)	Capital Power (83.3%); TransAlta (16.7%)	2023 (Note: Units 1 and 2 to burn 50% coal and 50% natural gas by spring 2021 and mid-2020, respectively. Unit 3 to burn 60% coal and 40% gas by spring 2020, and to be adjusted to a 50/50 ratio at a later date. The entire power station converted to 100% natural gas in 2024.)	2024	
H. R. Milner Generating Station	Alberta	54.007470°N 119.103187°W	158	Coal	Milner Power		2019	
Hearn	Ontario	43°38.730′N 79°20.105′W	1,200	Coal	OPG	1951	1983	215 m (705 ft) ×1
Keephills Generating Station	Alberta	53.448779°N 114.450256°W	861	Coal	Capital Power		2021	
Lakeview	Ontario	43°34′16″N 79°33′6″W	2,400	Coal	OPG	1962	2005	150 m (492 ft) ×4
Lambton	Ontario	42°47′50″N 82°28′10″W	1,976	Coal	OPG	1969	2013	168 m (550 ft) ×3
Nanticoke	Ontario	42°48′0″N 80°3′1″W	3,964	Coal	OPG	1973	2013	198 m (650 ft) ×2
Sundance Power Station	Alberta	53°30′27″N 114°33′26″W	812	Coal	TransAlta		2021	
Thunder Bay	Ontario	48°21′36″N 89°13′12″W	306	Coal (1963-2014); Biomass (2015-2018)	OPG	1963	2018	198 m (650 ft) & 107 m (350 ft)
Wabamun	Alberta	53°33′30″N 114°29′17″W	582	Coal	TransAlta	1956	2010	156 (512 ft) ×3

== See also ==
- List of coal mines in Canada
- List of coalfields in Canada
- Coal mining in Saskatchewan
- Petroleum industry in Canada
