= Slyce =

Slyce Inc.
- Type: Private
- Industry: Visual search recognition technology
- Founders: Cameron Chell; Erika Racicot, COO; Mark Elfenbein, CEO
- Headquarters: Philadelphia, Pennsylvania, USA
- Area served: International
- Key people: Ted Mann, CEO
- Products: Slyce mobile app; SnipSnap mobile app; Craves mobile app
- Services: Visual Relevancy Engine; Tag and Display
- Website: slyce.it

Slyce Inc. is a visual search and recognition company headquartered in Philadelphia, Pennsylvania, with operations in New Waterford, Nova Scotia. The company developed image recognition technology that can identify products based on a picture and allow the user to purchase the item on their smartphone. The company has partnered with a number of retailers in the United States and Europe to operate its technology inside their mobile applications, including Neiman Marcus, Best Buy, and Home Depot. The company also operates two other mobile apps, Craves, and SnipSnap.

Slyce traded publicly on the TSX Venture Exchange market. In January 2017, its assets were acquired by Anzu Partners, a venture capital firm, for an undisclosed sum, and taken private.

== History ==
Slyce was founded by Cameron Chell and Erika Racicot in January 2012 through their business consulting firm that they founded together, Business Instincts. The company was originally located in Calgary, Alberta, but later moved the headquarters to Toronto, Ontario, with additional offices in Calgary, New Waterford, Nova Scotia and Minneapolis, Minnesota.

By early 2014, Mark Elfenbein was the president and CEO of Slyce and generated $10.75 million in its Series A round of funding., followed by an additional $12 million Series B round of funding in 2014 In April 2014, Slyce announced it was going public through an amalgamation agreement with Oculus Ventures. Later in the year, Slyce acquired Tel Aviv-based BuyCode, a mobile app development company, for its Pounce shopping app technology. Slyce also acquired Minneapolis app developer Drivetrain Agency. After the acquisitions, Drivetrain CEO Dan Grigsby joined Slyce as chief technology officer, and BuyCode CEO Avital Yachin joined as chief product officer.

In April 2016, Ted Mann, President of Slyce's Consumer App Group, and former founder and CEO of SnipSnap, took over as Slyce's CEO. In January, 2017, the company's assets were acquired by Anzu Partners, a venture capital firm, for an undisclosed sum, the company was taken private, and its headquarters was officially moved to Philadelphia.

In November 2020, Slyce has partnered with Catchoom and Humai. This collaboration is to provide solutions for retail environments.

== Platform ==
Slyce develops visual search and recognition technology for larger retailers to use on their brand's websites and mobile applications. The company works with six of the top 20 retailers in the United States, including Neiman Marcus. The visual search technology that Slyce developed uses pictures of products to determine what kind of product it is and then analyzes the subject based on a schema according to the type of product and its attributes. Slyce is often referred to as "The Shazam for shopping."

== Products ==
Slyce has produced several products and services, including the Snap-to-Buy product recognition platform. Snap-to-Buy can be integrated into a retailer's existing website to identify products. The application takes the user to the website to purchase identified products. Slyce has also developed visual search recognition technology, such as the Visual Relevancy Engine, which compares the attributes of a product and delivers products that are similar, and a service that can identify products from pictures on social media sites like Facebook or Instagram.
