= Mainprize =

Mainprize may refer to:

- Mainprise
- Mainprize Regional Park
