= McDonald Lake (Saskatchewan) =

Lake in Saskatchewan, Canada

- Rafferty Reservoir
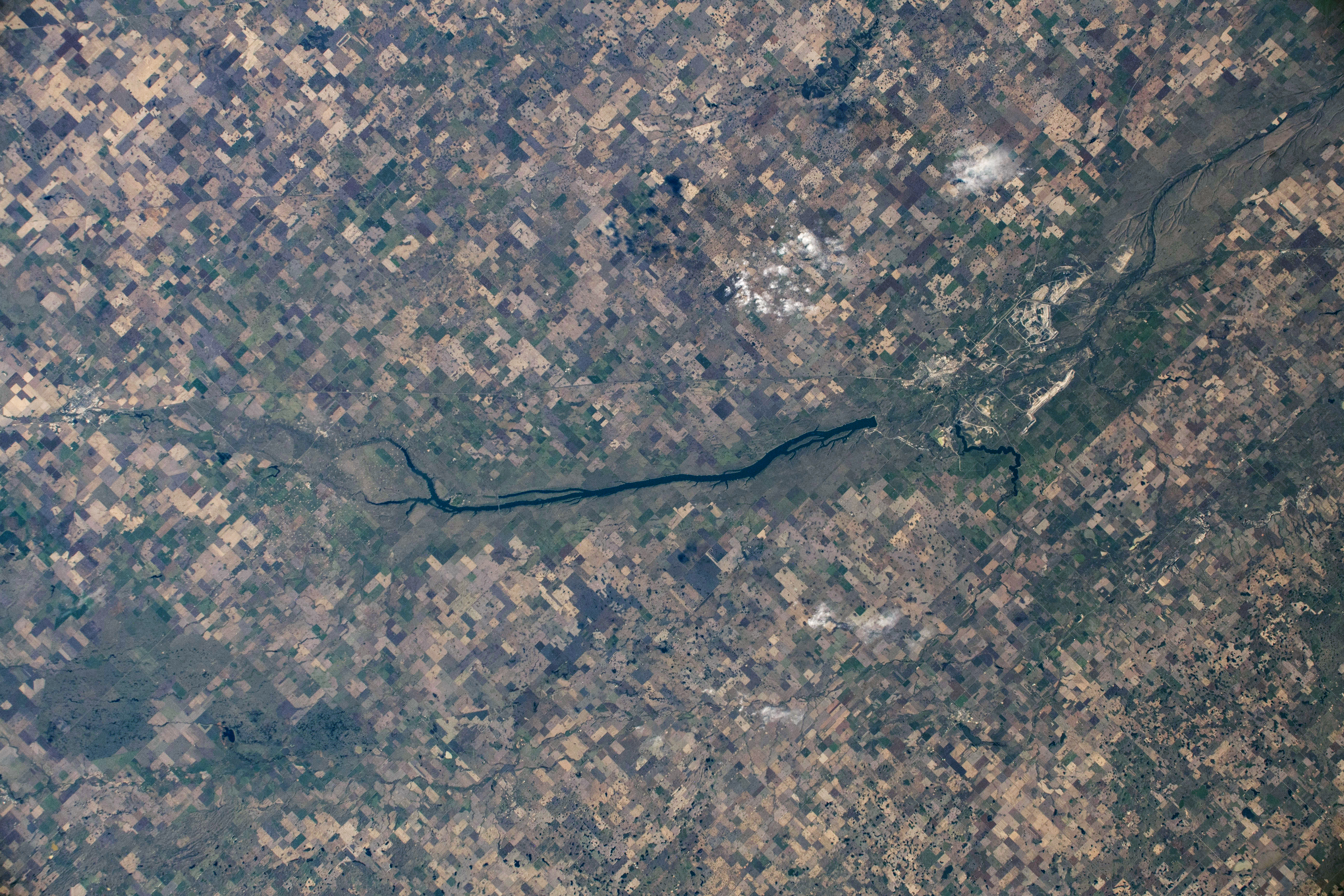
- McDonald Lake as seen from the ISS

- Location in Saskatchewan McDonald Lake (Canada)
- Location: Southeast Saskatchewan
- Coordinates: 49.194°N 103.238°W
- Type: Reservoir
- Part of: Red River drainage basin
- Primary inflows: Souris River
- Primary outflows: Souris River
- Catchment area: 2,448 km^{2} (945 sq mi)
- Managing agency: Saskatchewan Water Security Agency
- Built: July 1, 1991
- Max. length: 57 km (35 mi)
- Max. width: 1.2 km (0.75 mi)
- Surface area: 4,341.3 ha (10,728 acres)
- Max. depth: 15 m (49 ft)
- Water volume: 439,600 dam^{3} (356,400 acre⋅ft)
- Surface elevation: 556 m (1,824 ft)
- Settlements: None

McDonald Lake, also known as Rafferty Reservoir, is a reservoir in the south-eastern part of the Canadian province of Saskatchewan. It was created when the Rafferty Dam was built on the Souris River in 1994. Before the dam was built that flooded the Souris Valley, McDonald Lake was a small lake and marsh on the valley floor adjacent to the Souris River.

The reservoir provides water to the Shand Power Station and to the city of Estevan. A 10-kilometre (6.2 mi) long pipeline supplies the power station and a 9.2-kilometre (5.7 mi) long pipeline, which originates along the Souris River river bed at the bottom of the reservoir, brings water to the Estevan water treatment plant. The water pipeline that brings water to Estevan was completed in 2020 after a three-year project that changed the source of Estevan's drinking water away from Boundary Dam Reservoir.

== Rafferty Dam ==
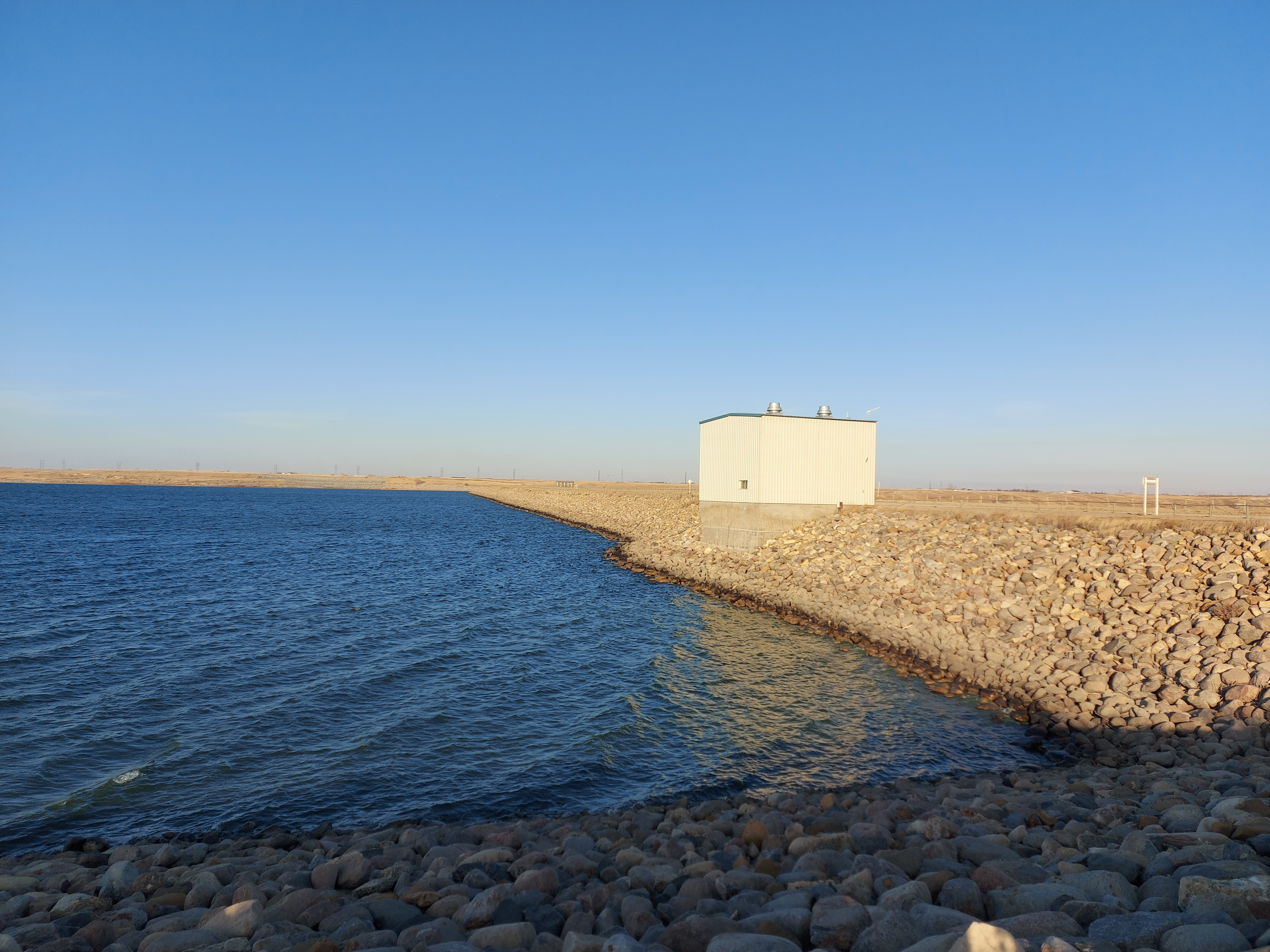
Rafferty Dam and reservoir

Rafferty Dam (49.1522°N 103.0894°W) is at the south-eastern corner of the lake, about 4.8 kilometres (3.0 mi) upstream from Estevan. It was built in conjunction with the Grant Devine Dam (formally known as Alameda Dam), which was built further downstream on Moose Mountain Creek. Both dams are operated by the Saskatchewan Water Security Agency. The dam and reservoir provide flood control along the Souris River, irrigation, and recreation.

The height of the top of the dam is 555 m (1,821 ft) above sea level. The maximum height available for flood control is 554 m (1,818 ft). The normal full supply level is 550.5 m (1,806 ft) and the normal drawdown level is 549.5 m (1,803 ft). The maximum draw down is 547.5 m (1,796 ft) above sea level. At full supply, the reservoir covers an area of 4,881 ha (12,060 acres). Two additional dams were built to contain the reservoir: The 12.1-metre (40 ft) high Rafferty R3-2 Closure Dam (49.3434°N 103.5351°W) and the 10.3-metre (34 ft) high Rafferty R4-1 Closure Dam (49.3717°N 103.5805°W). Highway 606 crosses R3-2 and R4-1 is at Mainprize Regional Park.

A 10-kilometre (6.2 mi) long spillway connects the Boundary Dam Reservoir to McDonald Lake, allowing excess water to flow into McDonald Lake. The flow can also be reversed if necessary.

In 2025, $15 million was spent in upgrades at the dam. The upgrades included $10 million on repairs to the underdrainage system on the dam's spillway, $2.5 million in upgrades to the control structure at the diversion channel, and another $2.5 million in upgrades to the 11-kilometre (6.8 mi) long Rafferty Road. Rafferty road runs along the top of the dam and connects Highways 18 and 39.

== Mainprize Regional Park ==
Mainprize Regional Park (49.3691°N 103.5821°W) is a regional park in the RM of Cymri No. 36 on the eastern shore at the northern end of McDonald Lake. The park includes a golf course, a campground, cabins, Pederson Place (a 5,000 sq ft (460 m^{2}) multi-purpose hall with a 3,000 sq ft (280 m^{2}) deck), a beach area, group camping, a boat launch, hiking trails, and four residential cottage subdivisions. Access to Mainprize is from Highway 606.

In 1961, the regional park was founded in the Souris River Valley about 5 kilometres (3.1 mi) downstream from the park's current location. With the building of the Rafferty Dam and subsequent flooding of the valley, the park was moved to its current location. It was named after Dr. William Graham Mainprize, who served the nearby community of Midale for over 50 years.

The golf course is a par 72, Scottish links-style 18-hole course that was built in 1994. It has grass greens and there are 6,958 total yards. Amenities include a pro shop, rentals, a restaurant, and a licensed lounge.

== Fish species ==
Fish commonly found in McDonald Lake include walleye, northern pike, white sucker, and yellow perch. Between 1992 and 1999, the lake was stocked with over 20 million walleye.

== Gallery ==
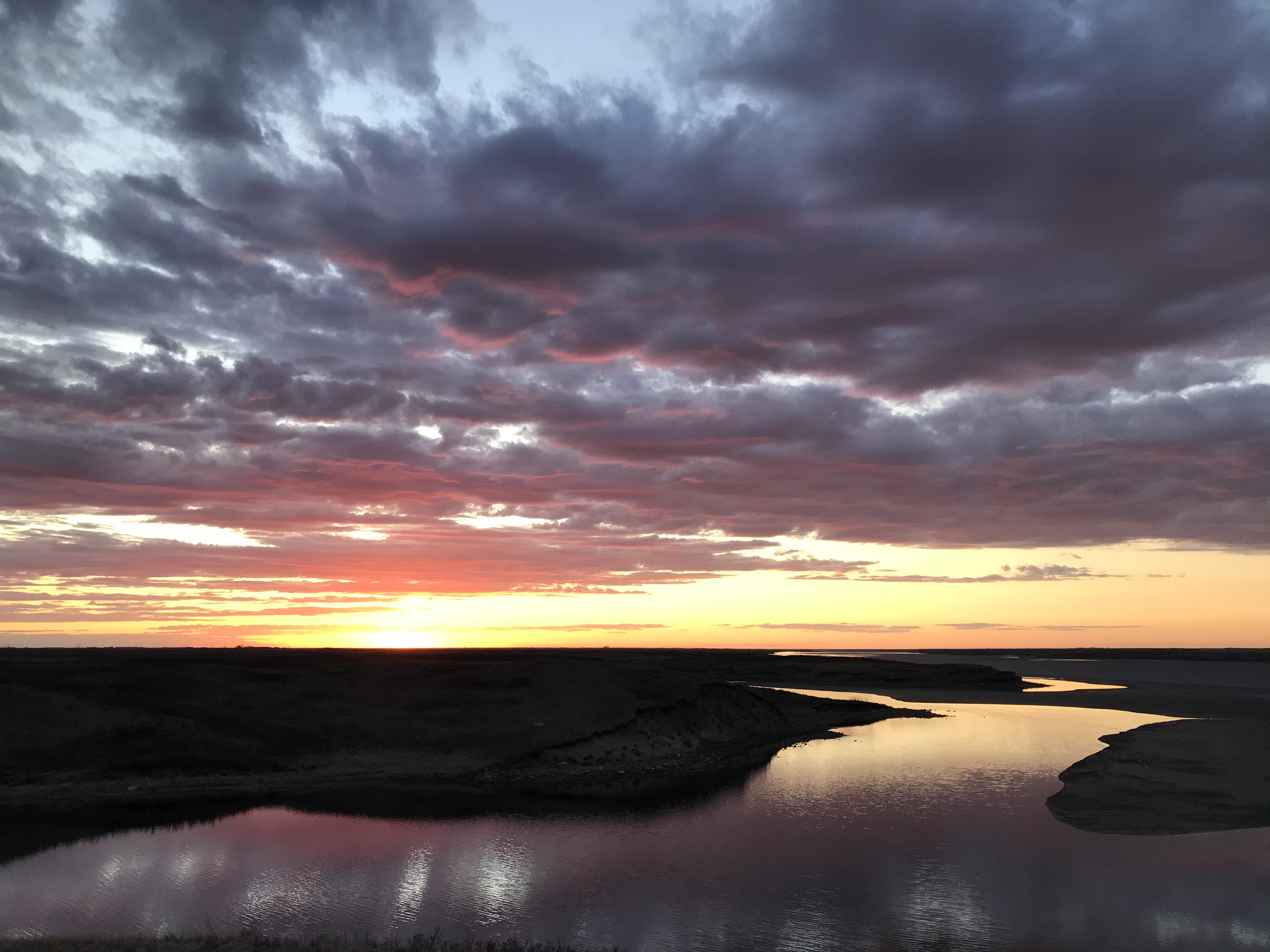
Sunset on McDonald Lake

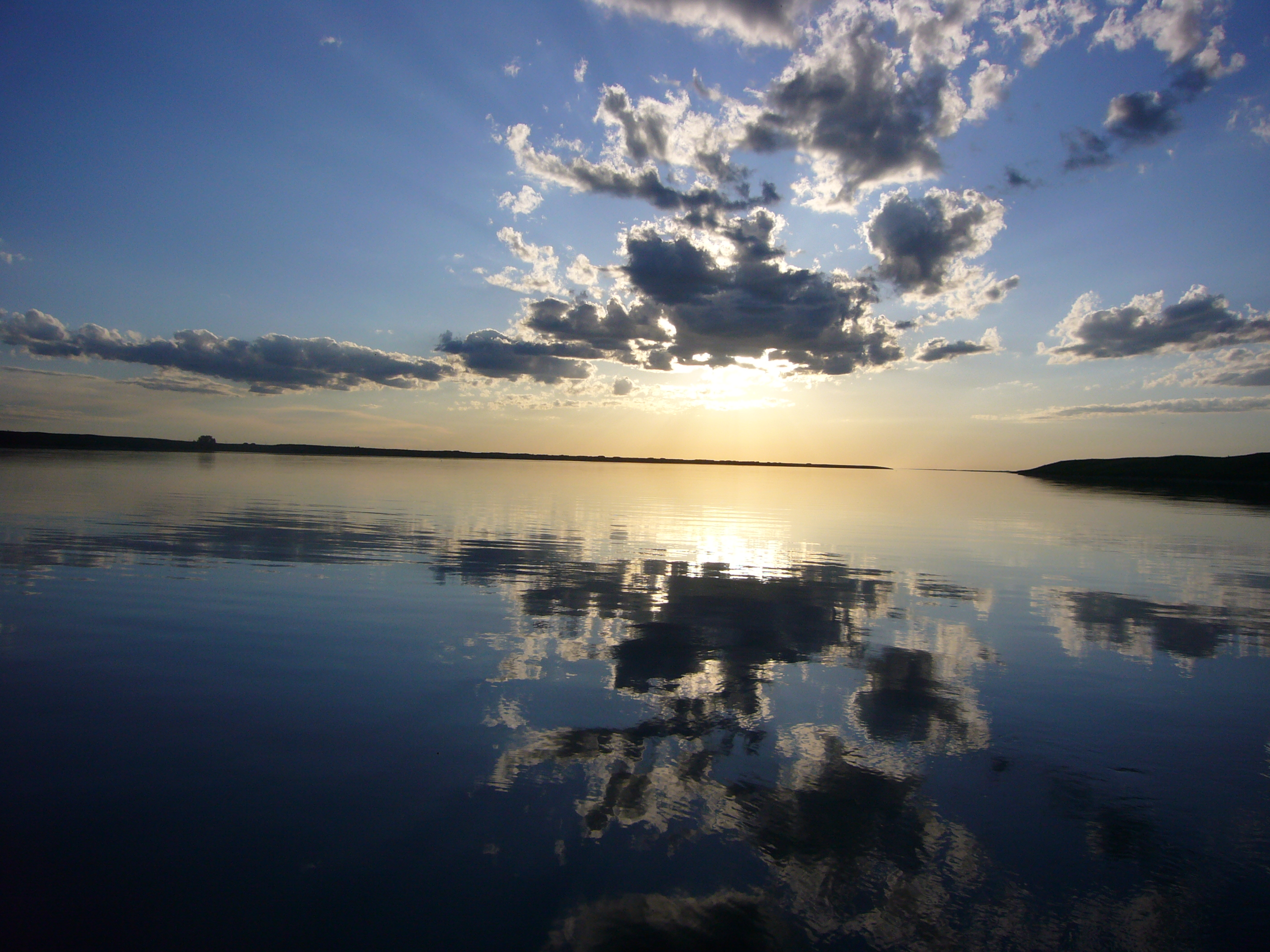
McDonald Lake

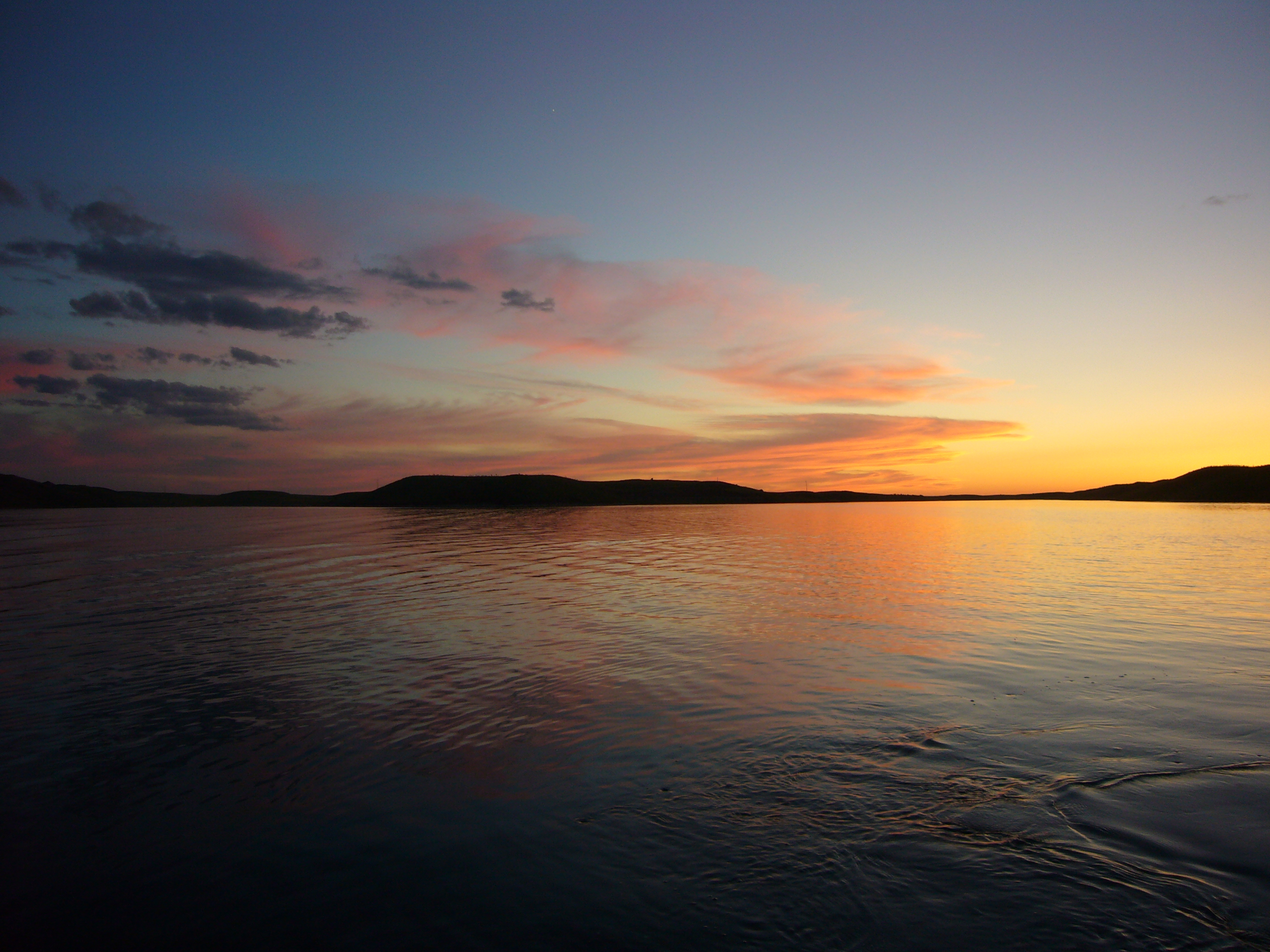
McDonald Lake

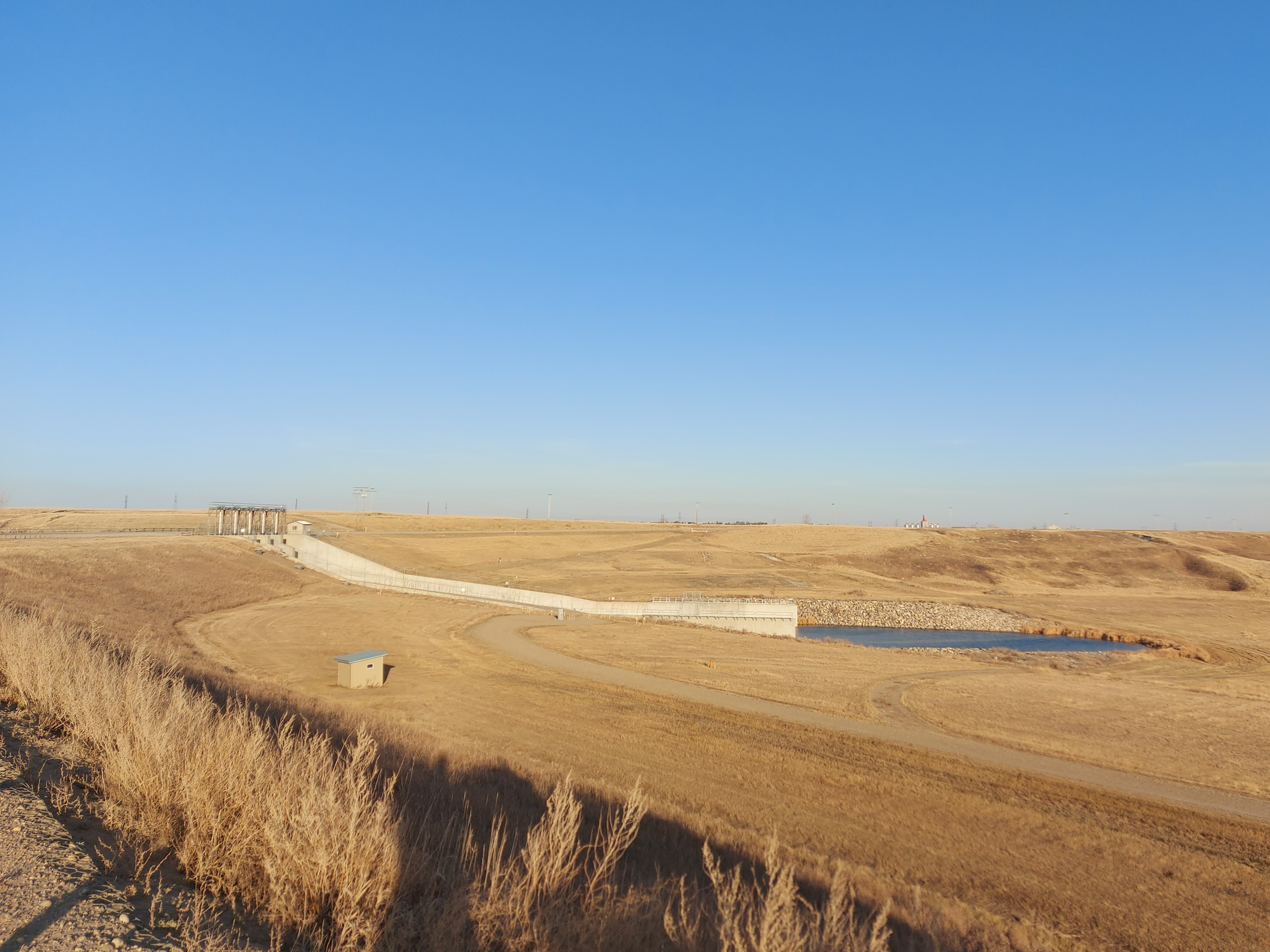
The dam's spillway

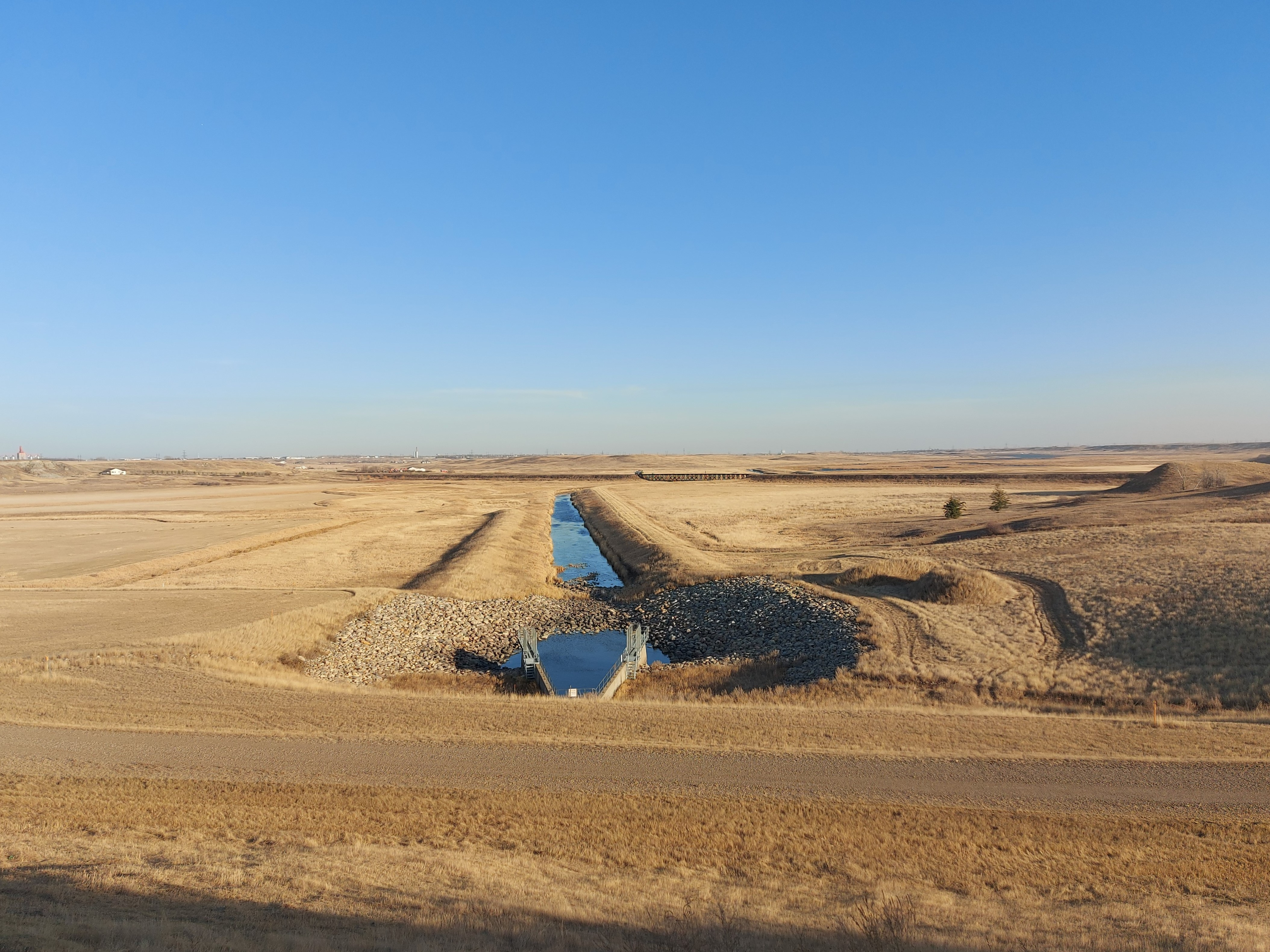
The dam's riparian outlet

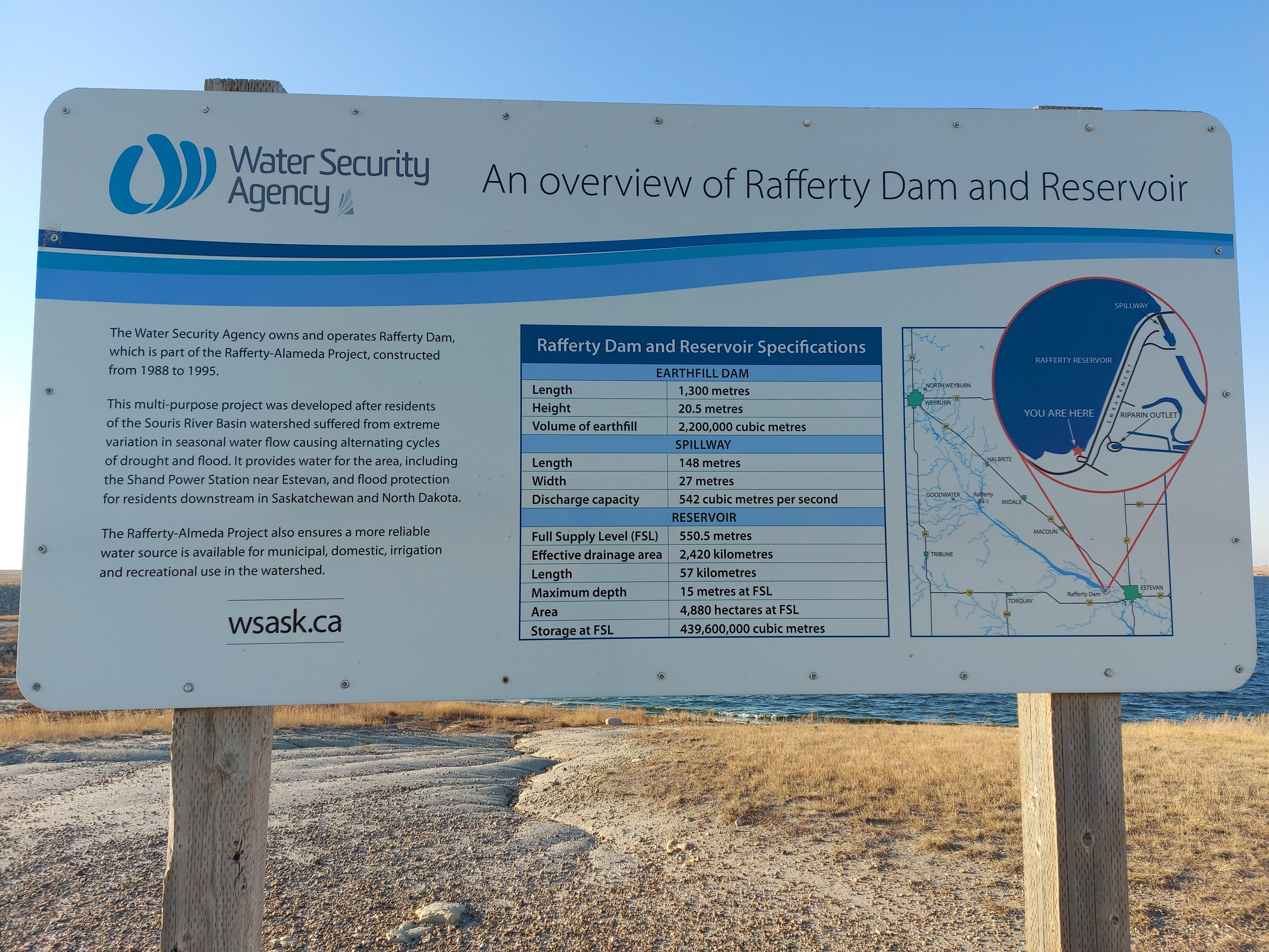
The information sign at the look out at Rafferty Dam

== See also ==
- Lake Darling Dam
- 2011 Souris River flood
- Boundary Dam Power Station
- List of dams in Saskatchewan
- List of lakes of Saskatchewan
- Tourism in Saskatchewan
