= Coal mining in Saskatchewan =

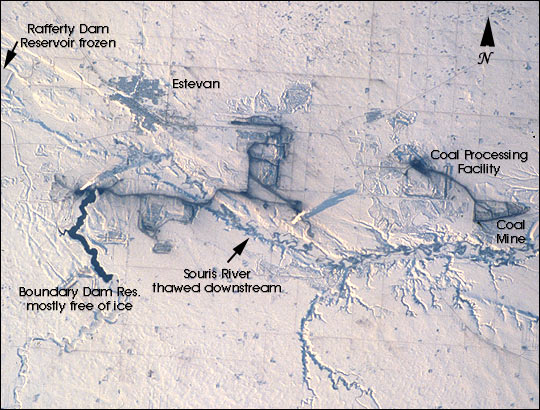
Estevan, and the Estevan Coalfield, along the Souris River, viewed from the Space Shuttle, February 2001

Coal has been mined in Saskatchewan ever since the 1850s when it was used as a source of heat for the early Pioneers in the treeless Great Plains. Today, coal is still mined in Saskatchewan, but it is primarily used to generate electricity.

== History ==
In 1857, John Palliser found coal during his expeditions across southern Saskatchewan.

The first farmers in southern Saskatchewan also noticed this coal and burning it for heat. During this period, there were no commercial mines; instead farmers would collect coal from exposed seams on the edges of riverbanks and hillsides, or dig small, shallow "gopher hole" mines in their own fields.

By the 1870s, the first commercial coal mines were dug underground along the banks of Willow Bunch Lake. This coal was used for heating, and also for industrial purposes. Underground mines were used in Saskatchewan until 1956. Most of the underground mines were abandoned after their closures, and the numbers of abandoned mines are estimated at 100 around Estevan, 200 around Wood Mountain, and 60 around Shaunavon.

In 1882, the first coal exports from Saskatchewan occurred. Coal from Roche Percee was loaded onto barges on the Souris River, and was sent to Winnipeg to be sold. In 1892, a Soo Line rail spur was built to the coalfields near Estevan which allowed coal to be shipped by rail.

In 1927, the first strip mine was dug in Saskatchewan. Strip mining is the only type of coal mining that still takes place in Saskatchewan today, and occurs mainly in the Estevan area, and to a lesser extent in the Willow Bunch / Wood Mountain areas.

Coal use in Saskatchewan accelerated once it started being used for electricity generation. In 1928, Dominion Electric purchased Estevan Generating Station (EGS) from the municipality and by 1930, they had converted it into a coal-fired facility. The facility was purchased by SaskPower in 1946, and became SaskPower's first major coal power plant. By 1957, the generating capacity of EGS was 70 MW.

Between the 1960s and the 1990s, SaskPower built three more coal-fired power plants: Boundary Dam, Poplar River, and Shand. In 1960, Manitoba Hydro installed two generating units in Selkirk that burned Saskatchewan Lignite, and between 1957 and 1970, they installed five more units in Brandon that burned Saskatchewan Lignite. In 1981 and 1982, Ontario Hydro built two new coal units on their Thunder Bay Generating Station that burned primarily Saskatchewan Lignite, with some sub-bituminous coal mixed in from either Alberta or Wyoming. In 1985, Ontario Hydro built their Atikokan Generating Station, which also burned mainly Saskatchewan Lignite plus a small amount of Alberta or Wyoming sub-bituminous coal.

Today, Ontario has ceased operation of almost all their coal facilities, Manitoba only has one remaining coal facility and it only runs under emergency conditions, and SaskPower has decommissioned the Estevan Generating Station and two of the six generating units at Boundary Dam.

Saskatchewan coal production peaked in 1988 at approximately 12 million tonnes, and production is expected to continue falling until 2030 when all coal plants without CCS technology are mandated to close across Canada.

== New discoveries ==
Between 2008 and 2012, significant new coal deposits were discovered north of Hudson Bay, Saskatchewan wrapping around the Pasquia Hills. These deposits are thought to be part of a larger coal trend called the Durango Trend that potentially stretches from Pine River, Manitoba to La Ronge, Saskatchewan.

The coal in this area has a much higher energy density than the lignite in Southern Saskatchewan, and the seams are much thicker. The classification is sub-bituminous, which makes the coal similar to that found in Alberta and the Powder River Basin. Although the energy density is high, the coal in this area contains non-negligible amounts of sodium which prevents it from being used for electricity generation without some form of pre-processing.

The close proximity of these coal deposits to Manitoba make this coal a good candidate for Coal Liquefaction or Gasification. Manitoba has abundant, zero-emission, low-cost hydroelectricity that can make the above processes affordable, while keeping emissions low.

== Coal characteristics ==
Saskatchewan has three geological formations that contain coal: the Paleocene Ravenscrag Formation which is 55 to 65 Million years old, the Upper Cretaceous Belly River / Judith River Formation which is 75 to 80 Million years old, and the Lower Cretaceous Mannville Group which is 105 to 121 Million years old.

The Ravenscrag Formation (which is part of the Fort Union Group) exists across Southern Saskatchewan and has the most-economic lignite seams due to the shallow coal depth and low water table. The formation contains three coal mining regions: Estevan, Willow Bunch / Wood Mountain, and Shaunavon / Cypress Hills.

The coal in the Hudson Bay area is part of the Mannville Group.

Coal Region	Energy Density		Moisture	Ash	Volatile Matter	Fixed Carbon	Sulphur	Thickness
Coal Region	GJ/tonne	BTU/lb	%	%	%	%	%	m
Hudson Bay / Pasquia Hills	19.6	8,426	28.0	24.4	5.3	39.7	2.6	25
Estevan / Bienfait	15.1	6,492	37.5	9.1	24.6	24.8	0.3	1.52
Willow Bunch / Wood Mountain	12.2	5,245	39.5	13.7	23.7	23.1	0.5	1.85
Shaunavon / Cypress Hills	10.6	4,557	40.9	17.5	21.5	20.1	0.7	1.72

== Active mines ==
All of the commercial coal mining in Saskatchewan is currently done by Westmoreland Mining LLC. Westmoreland's Estevan Mine currently consists of four active pits, and supplies coal directly to Boundary Dam and Shand. Westmoreland also operates a Char Plant (for making Barbecue Briquettes) and an Activated Carbon Plant, and both plants are fed with coal from the Estevan mine. Westmoreland's Poplar River Mine consists of two active pits, and it supplies coal to Poplar River Power Station via rail.

== See also ==
- Coal in Canada

== Works cited ==
- MacKenzie, Janet (February 6, 2003). Saskatchewan's Long History of Coal Mining (PDF). Western Development Museum.
- Saskatchewan Energy and Mines (December 1994). Coal in Saskatchewan (PDF). Saskatchewan Publications Centre.
