= Breton Education Centre =

Location
- 667 Eighth Street; New Waterford, Nova Scotia, B1H 3T4; Canada
- Coordinates: 46°14′31.2″N 60°5′21.3″W

Information
- School type: Public, high school and middle school
- Founded: 1970
- School board: Cape Breton – Victoria Regional School Board
- Principal: Danielle Aucoin
- Grades: 6-12
- Enrollment: 620 (2020)
- Language: English
- Colours: Green , white and black
- Team name: Bears
- Feeder schools: Greenfield Elementary
- Website: sites.google.com/a/gnspes.ca/old-site/

Breton Education Centre (BEC) is a co-ed high school with students from grades 6–12 in New Waterford, Nova Scotia. It is part of the Cape Breton – Victoria Regional School Board. BEC opened in 1970 in New Waterford, NS serving 2,300 students from grades 7–12. The enrolment has dwindled for the past couple of decades as well as in other schools in surrounding areas. BEC replaced 3 other high schools in New Waterford including Central High, Mt Carmel High, and St Agnes High. There are currently 620 students at BEC, a decrease by 30 students from the 2015 enrolment of 650. In 2016, BEC, as well as other schools in the CBVRCE added Grade 6 education to their school. Every year BEC holds their annual Coal Bowl Classic, a tradition since 1981.

== Academics ==
=== Departments ===
- English Department
- Fine Arts Department
- Family Studies/Tec. Ed Department
- French Department
- Math Department
- Physical Education Department
- Science Department
- Social Studies Department
- Learning Strategies
- Skilled Trades
- Sexual Education w/Doug Mackinnon

== See also ==
- List of schools in Nova Scotia
- Education in Canada
