= William Davis (miner) =

Canadian coal miner (1887–1925)

William Davis (June 3, 1887 — June 11, 1925) was a coal miner from Cape Breton Island. He was born in Gloucestershire, England and killed by a police officer during a union labour action in New Waterford, Nova Scotia. His name is well-remembered in Nova Scotia due to the annual observance of William Davis Miners' Memorial Day in recognition of Davis and also of all miners killed in the province's coal mines.

== Early life ==
Davis was a coal miner from a young age. His father worked in the mines at Springhill, Nova Scotia, and his older brother, then fourteen years old, was killed in the 1891 explosion there. Davis began working for the Dominion Coal Company Limited (DOMCO) in 1905 at various collieries in the Sydney coalfield in Cape Breton, eventually graduating to become a pumpman and a roadmaker, lastly at the No. 12 Colliery in New Waterford. He married in 1907 and, by 1925, was raising a family of nine children. His wife, Myrtle, was carrying a tenth child due in September.

== BESCO and District 26 ==
The DOMCO mines were subsumed by the British Empire Steel Corporation (BESCO) in 1920. BESCO management, under Roy Wolvin, soon began a targeted campaign to break the miners' union, organized under the United Mine Workers of America (UMW), District 26.

There were many small strikes in the Sydney coalfield between 1920 and 1925, but the longest, in 1925, lasted from March to August. When the latest contract expired on January 15, 1925, BESCO refused to deal with the union and on March 2 cut off credit at the company stores. The union went on strike four days later, with 12,000 miners manning the picket lines, leaving a small workforce to maintain the mines and keep them from flooding. Despite the economic hardship which saw families come to the brink of starvation by June, the miners' resolve was strong.

When BESCO refused arbitration, the union adopted a policy of 100 per cent picketing. This included shutting down operations at the pumping station and power plant at Waterford Lake, which would prevent the company from resuming operations in that district. On June 10, BESCO tasked its company police force to return to Waterford Lake with thirty company workers and continue its plan to restart the water and electricity to its facilities and to the parts of town that had the benefit of running water and power.

The following morning on June 11, the company police began a patrol pattern of intimidation which led to small clashes throughout town, culminating in a protest by 700 to 3,000 striking miners who marched on the Waterford Lake in an attempt to persuade the company workers to support the strike. The company police were staring down the miners at 11:00 AM when the police charged the crowd, firing over 300 shots and injuring many. One police officer shot deliberately at Davis, piercing his heart and killing him within minutes.

The company police force then retreated as the miners swarmed the facility. The coal miners also began attacking company stores and other coal company properties in the Sydney coalfield, resulting in the deployment of the provincial police force and almost 2,000 soldiers from the Canadian Army - the second-largest military deployment for an internal conflict in Canadian history after the North-West Rebellion of 1885.

Davis's funeral was held on June 14 with 5,000 mourners in attendance, the largest ever held for a funeral in New Waterford. BESCO police officer Joseph MacLeod appeared at a preliminary hearing in Sydney on a charge of murder, relating to Davis' shooting death. However, the Crown prosecutor dropped charges and agreed with the defence that the identity of the shooter was unknown and that MacLeod should not be singled out of the many police officers involved that day. However, it was known that Davis was shot by BESCO police officer Harry Muldoon. The day after William Davis was shot, Harry Muldoon and his family were relocated to Boston, Massachusetts for their own personal safety, to begin a new life.

BESCO eventually accepted government intervention and agreed to settle the strike. BESCO gave up its attempts to break District 26 UMW, which by then had grown to become one of the most militant labour organizations on the continent. The company was eventually taken over and merged into a larger conglomerate in 1930 called the Dominion Steel and Coal Corporation (DOSCO), but Industrial Cape Breton remained a hotbed of labour activism

== Davis Day and memorials ==
UMWA District 26 supported establishing a fund for the Davis family and their mother, as well as designating every June 11 as an "idle day" in his memory. The first Davis Day, on June 11, 1926 saw many Cape Breton miners refuse to work, parading instead to the union hall in New Waterford and then to a local church for a memorial service. Davis Day spread throughout District 26 in the ensuing years and became universally observed by miners throughout Nova Scotia, although it did not become a paid holiday until 1969. Davis' widow, Myrtle (MacPherson) Davis, and his family received a monthly sum from the UMWA fund, with which she was able to purchase a headstone for her husband's grave; she died in 1955 and is buried with him.

In addition to Davis Day, New Waterford has "Davis Square" which was established in 1985. The Davis Wilderness Trail was established in 1996 and follows the route taken by the miners on June 11, 1925 to the Waterford Lake pumping station and power plant.
