= Coal Bowl (basketball tournament) =

High school basketball tournament in Canada

The Coal Bowl Classic is a national invitational male/female high school basketball tournament, which is held at Breton Education Centre in New Waterford, Nova Scotia, Canada. The first tournament was held in 1982 with Queen Elizabeth High School of Halifax, Nova Scotia, Canada winning the cup. A major facilitating factor is that all team members are housed within one wing of the school. Breton Education Centre is a combined middle school and high school which opened in 1970.

The tournament, first held in 1982, takes its name from the former primary industry of New Waterford, coal mining. Coal mining employed thousands of men and was the main industry on the Island for over 100 years. The last mine to close on the island was Prince Colliery in 2001. However, Kameron Coal Ltd opened a coal mine in Donkin (just outside Glace Bay) in 2017.

The tournament held in February in the year of 2020 will be the Coal Bowl Classic's 38th year.
