= Boundary Dam Reservoir =

Reservoir in Saskatchewan, Canada

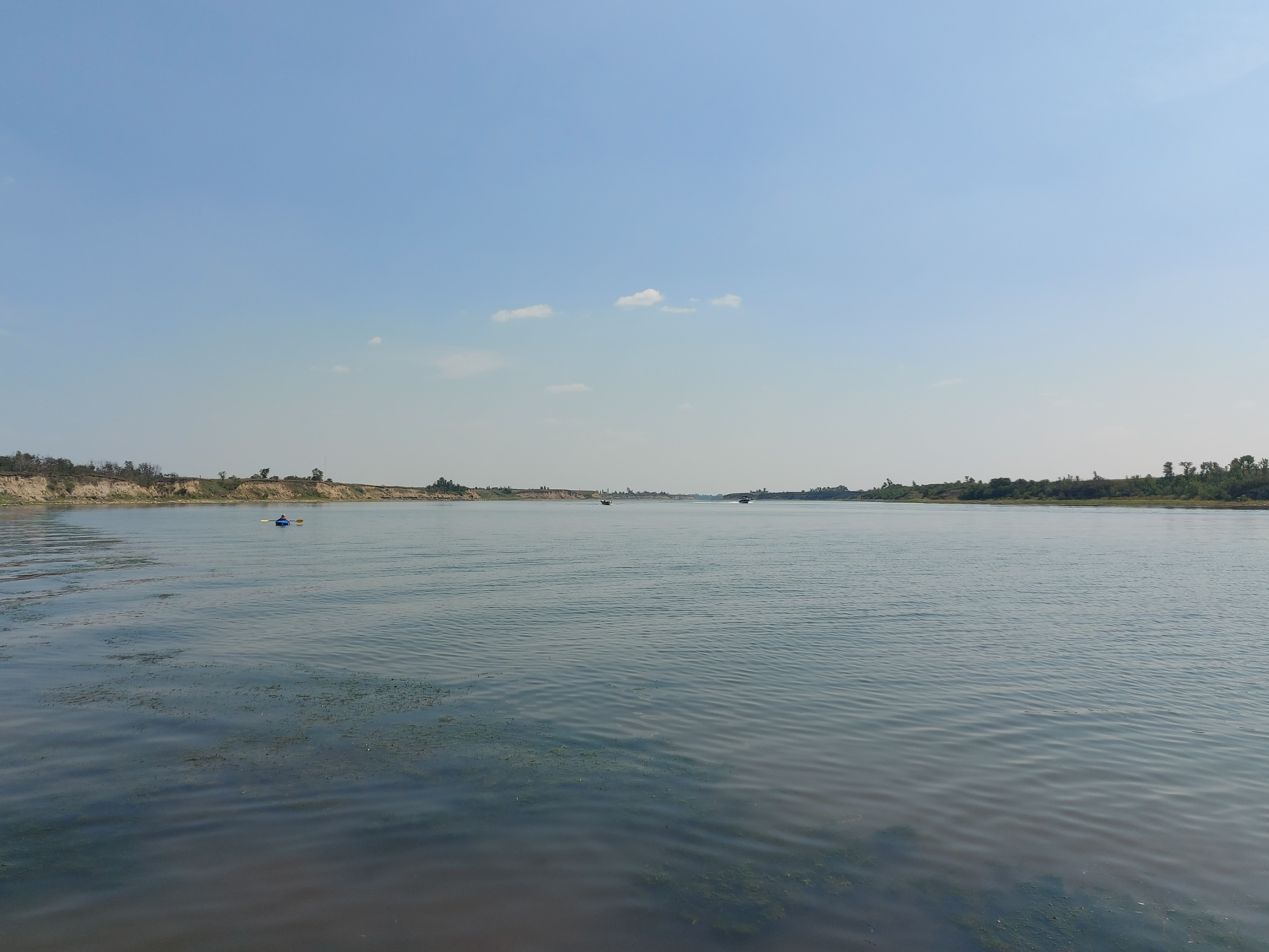
- Boundary Dam Reservoir

- Location within Saskatchewan Location within Canada
- Location: RM of Estevan No. 5, Saskatchewan
- Coordinates: 49.0501°N 103.0338°W
- Type: Reservoir
- Part of: Red River drainage basin
- Primary inflows: Long Creek
- Primary outflows: Long Creek, and a 10-km diversion channel connecting Boundary and Rafferty Reservoirs, which allows water to be diverted from Boundary Reservoir into McDonald Lake
- Managing agency: SaskPower
- Built: 1957
- First flooded: 1957
- Surface area: 668 ha (1,650 acres)
- Max. depth: 15 m (49 ft)
- Water volume: 61,480 dam^{3} (49,840 acre⋅ft)
- Shore length^{1}: 36.3 km (22.6 mi)
- Surface elevation: 560 m (1,840 ft)
- ^{1} Shore length is not a well-defined measure.

Boundary Dam Reservoir is a man-made lake in the south-east corner of the Canadian province of Saskatchewan. It is in the RM of Estevan No. 5 and census division 1. The closest city is Estevan, which is about 5.5 kilometres (3.4 mi) downstream. There are no towns or villages along the lake's shore but there are two subdivisions and a regional park. The subdivisions, which are in the RM of Estevan, are called Sunset Bay and Lakewood. The primary inflow and outflow for the reservoir is Long Creek. There is a 10-kilometre (6.2 mi) long diversion channel that goes to McDonald Lake that can take excess water in either direction.

== Boundary Dam ==
The Boundary Dam was built in 1957 on Long Creek so that a reservoir could supply water to the Boundary Dam Power Station and the city of Estevan. The top of the dam is 563.88 metres (1,850.0 ft) above sea level. The full supply level is at 560 metres (1,840 ft), which gives the reservoir a capacity of 61,480 dam^{3} (49,840 acre⋅ft) when full. The maximum drawdown is 557.8 metres (1,830 ft), which gives it 16,755 dam^{3} (13,583 acre⋅ft) of flood control storage. The reservoir, though, is not intended for flood control as its value is in the water it supplies to the power station.

A three year project, that ran from 2017 to 2020, changed the city of Estevan's water supply from Boundary Reservoir to McDonald Lake.

== Woodlawn Regional Park ==
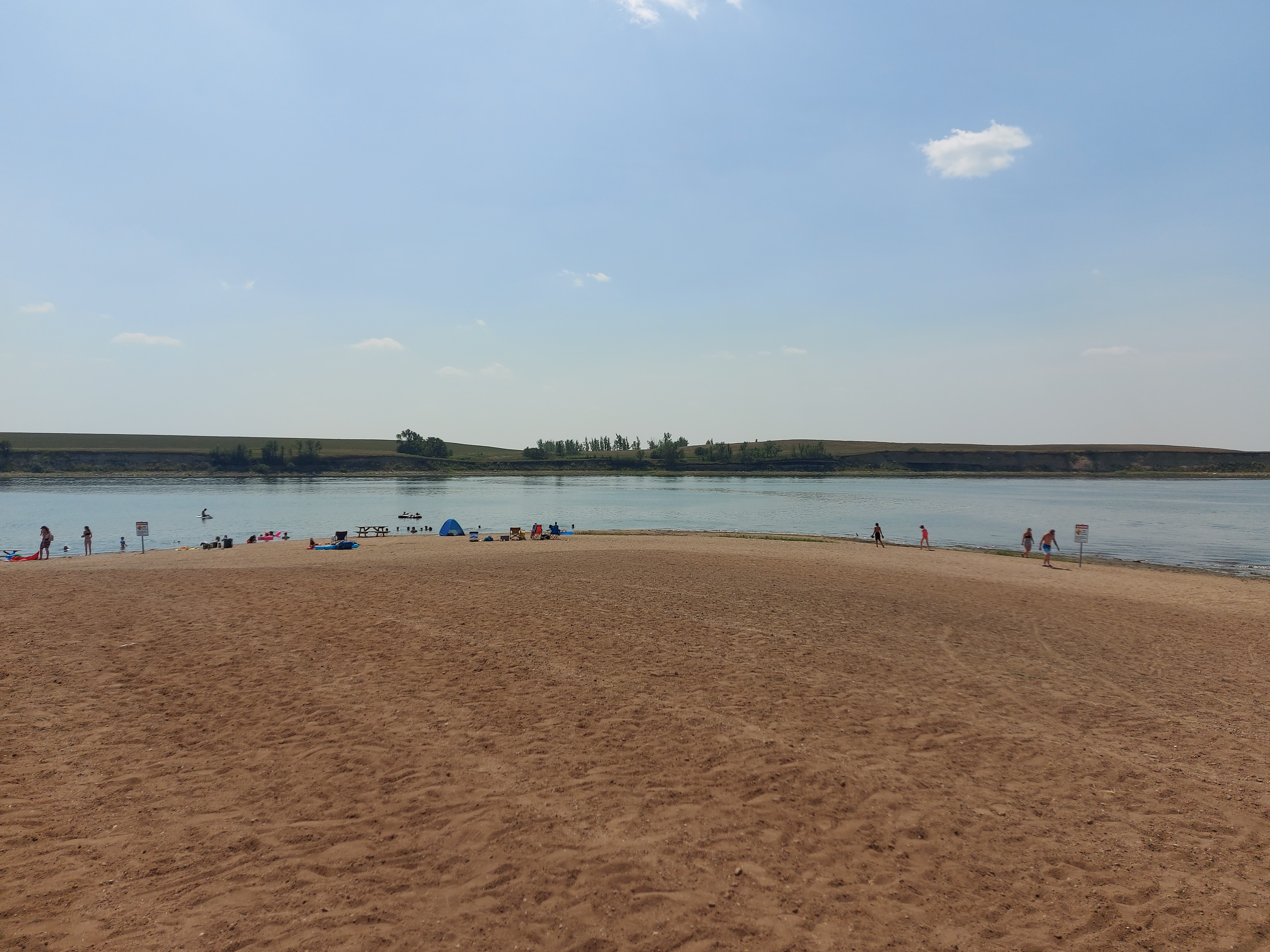
Main Beach at Woodlawn-Boundary Dam

Woodlawn Regional Park (49.1147°N 102.9857°W) is on the north-east shore of the reservoir. The park is divided into two sections. The original section, which is along the Souris River just south of Estevan, was founded in 1962. It features full-service camping, TS & M 18-hole golfing, Kayaking and Canoeing, live outdoor theatre, hiking, ball diamonds, and many more outdoor activities. In 2011, an historic flood nearly destroyed the park as silt was piled up eight feet in areas and parts of the river had widened by up to 50 feet.

In 2009, Woodlawn acquired the Boundary Dam portion of the park. This area features full-service camping, a beach area, a boat launch, professional beach volleyball courts, and the annual Beach Bash held each year in August. Boundary Dam Reservoir is the only lake in Saskatchewan that has a large area that does not freeze over in the winter due to warm water being returned to the lake from the Boundary Dam Power Station. This means that this is the only lake in Saskatchewan that supports largemouth bass.

== Fish species ==
Fish commonly found in the Boundary Dam Reservoir include walleye, largemouth bass, northern pike, white sucker, and yellow perch. Due to the warm water influx from the powerplant, a large section of the lake does not freeze over during winter. This allows for Saskatchewan's only population of largemouth bass.

== See also ==
- List of lakes of Saskatchewan
- List of protected areas of Saskatchewan
- Dams and reservoirs in Saskatchewan
