= New Waterford, Nova Scotia =

Community in Nova Scotia, Canada

New Waterford Port Lairge Ùr
- Motto: Conari Praestet / "It is better to have tried"
- Location of New Waterford, Nova Scotia
- Coordinates: 46°15′08″N 60°05′38″W
- Country: Canada
- Provinces of Canada: Nova Scotia
- Regional Municipality: Cape Breton Regional Municipality
- Incorporated Town: September 8, 1913
- Amalgamated: August 1, 1995

Area
  - Land: 9.23 km^{2} (3.56 sq mi)

Population (2021) From Statistics Canada
  - Total: 6,723
  - Density: 728.3/km^{2} (1,886/sq mi)
  - Change (2016-21): ▼−9.3%
- Time zone: UTC-4 (AST)
  - Summer (DST): UTC-3 (ADT)
- Canadian Postal code: B1H
- Area code: 902
- Telephone Exchange: 862

New Waterford (Scottish Gaelic: Port Lairge Ùr) is an urban community in the Cape Breton Regional Municipality, Nova Scotia, Canada.

== Geography ==
Formerly known as Barrachois Cove (from barachois, meaning a small port, lagoon, or pond), the community's present name is likely derived from the Irish seaport of Waterford, from which many early settlers originated. Coal mining in the area began as early as 1854 at Lingan and later at Low Point in 1865.

New Waterford is situated northeast of Sydney, Nova Scotia. It lies near the Atlantic Ocean and is bordered on one side by cliffs. The community has a relatively flat terrain and is located near several freshwater lakes.

== Economy ==
Population of New Waterford
Census	Population
Town	
1921	5,615
1931	7,745
1941	9,237
1951	10,423
1956	10,381
1961	10,592
1971	9,579
1981	8,808
1986	8,326
1991	7,695
Urban area / Population centre	
2001	10,185
2006	9,661
2011	8,942
2016	7,344
2021	6,723

New Waterford is a fishing port and former coal-mining community that has experienced economic decline since the closure of its last local mine in July 2001. Many residents had been employed in the coal and steel industries, which have since ceased operations.

The Breton Education Centre opened in 1970, consolidating former schools in the area. Central School closed, while St. Agnes and Mount Carmel were reduced to elementary schools. By 2025, only one elementary school remained in operation, following the closure of St. Agnes and Mount Carmel in 2016. St. Agnes Elementary was destroyed in a suspicious fire in 2017.

The Carmel Centre, built in 1967 to host community events and support non-profit activities, closed in 2018. It was destroyed by fire in 2022, after having been scheduled for demolition.

The town's Scotiabank branch closed in November 2024.

New Waterford maintains a number of services and amenities, including banks, a library, two pharmacies, a dental clinic, a hospital, and several retail and service businesses. The community also has two historical museums: the New Waterford & District Historical Society & Museum and the Fort Petrie Military Museum. From 1994 to 2020, the town was served by a local newspaper, The Community Press.

== Demographics ==
According to the 2021 Census of Population, New Waterford's population centre had 6,723 residents, a decline from 7,344 in 2016.

A significant proportion of New Waterford's residents are senior citizens; in 2021, 26.3% of the population was aged 65 or older. Children (0–17 years) made up 15.3% of the population, while the working-age group (ages 18–64) constituted 58.4%.

Following the closure of local coal mines in 2001, a call centre operated in the community between 2003 and 2011. Since 2011, the facility has been leased to the federal government as an application processing centre.

== Eight-thirty whistle ==
At 8:30 p.m. each day, the New Waterford Fire Department sounds its siren, locally known as the "8:30 Whistle." The siren has a long history and continues as a community tradition. The original purpose of the whistle is uncertain: some sources suggest it was intended to alert the town of mining disasters, others that it was used to signal fires, and some indicate it may have marked curfew.

== History ==
The first inhabitants of the area were the Mi'kmaq, whose lifestyle centred on hunting and fishing.

The historical industry in New Waterford has been coal mining. The creation of steam-powered machinery during the Industrial Revolution led to a demand for the coal deposits of Cape Breton and northern mainland Nova Scotia. Mining in the area began as early as 1854. The Dominion Coal Company began operating in New Waterford in 1907, drawing many workers, mainly from Irish and Scottish Catholic backgrounds. The town's name is likely derived from the Irish city of Waterford.

New Waterford was incorporated as a town on 8 September 1913.

On 25 July 1917, 65 people were killed in a coal mine explosion at New Waterford's No. 12 Colliery.

Demand for coal peaked during the Second World War. After the war, coal competed with oil and its production steadily declined. As a result, many residents left the community to seek employment elsewhere.

=== No. 12 Colliery Mine explosion ===
On the morning of 25 July 1917, an explosion occurred in the Dominion Company No. 12 Colliery in New Waterford, approximately 2,000 feet below the surface. At the time, 270 miners were working in the mine.

Accumulated methane gas and coal dust, due to poor ventilation, ignited, causing a large explosion. The blast killed 62 miners aged 14–65 and caused numerous other injuries. Rescue efforts began immediately, with firemen and miners, including workers from nearby mines, entering to assist. Three miners assisting in the rescue died from gas exposure. In total, 65 men lost their lives, making it the worst coal-mining disaster on Cape Breton Island to date.

The Dominion Coal Company maintained that the ventilation system was functioning properly, and investigated employee John McKay as being responsible for the explosion. This was despite miners' claims of gas buildup, and accounts from other miners that McKay could not have been on the level where the explosion occurred. A coroner's inquiry found the company guilty of gross negligence. The Amalgamated Mine Workers of Nova Scotia charged the company with criminal negligence and manslaughter against three officials. The Crown prosecutor did not present evidence, and the presiding judge, who had previously worked for the company, instructed the jury to acquit the defendants.

In 1922, a monument was erected listing the names and ages of the workers who died, commemorating both their lives and the efforts of rescuers.

=== Coal strike of 1925 ===
In the 1920s, the British Empire Steel Company controlled most of Nova Scotia's coal mines. Due to declining global coal demand and financial pressures, BESCO sought to cut miners' wages and restrict union activities. The miners' unions clashed repeatedly with BESCO, and multiple strikes were suppressed by police and armed forces.

In 1925, after contract negotiations failed, miners went on strike on 6 March, leaving a small workforce to maintain the mines and power plant. By June, the economic impact affected families heavily, but miners continued to protest. On 4 June, company police shut off water and power. On 9 June, miners initiated a full strike. On 11 June, miners marching on the plant were fired upon, killing 38-year-old William Davis, and injuring others, including Gilbert Watson and Jack MacQuarrie.

Miners subsequently stormed the plant, detained company police, looted stores, and burned collieries. The Canadian Armed Forces were deployed to restore order, marking the largest domestic deployment since the Northwest Rebellion of 1885.

On 25 June, the Conservative Party of Nova Scotia formed government and worked with BESCO and the strikers to reach a settlement. By 5 August, the strike ended and miners returned to work.

On 11 June 2025, Miners Memorial Day marked the 100th anniversary of the tragedy and the fight for workers' rights.

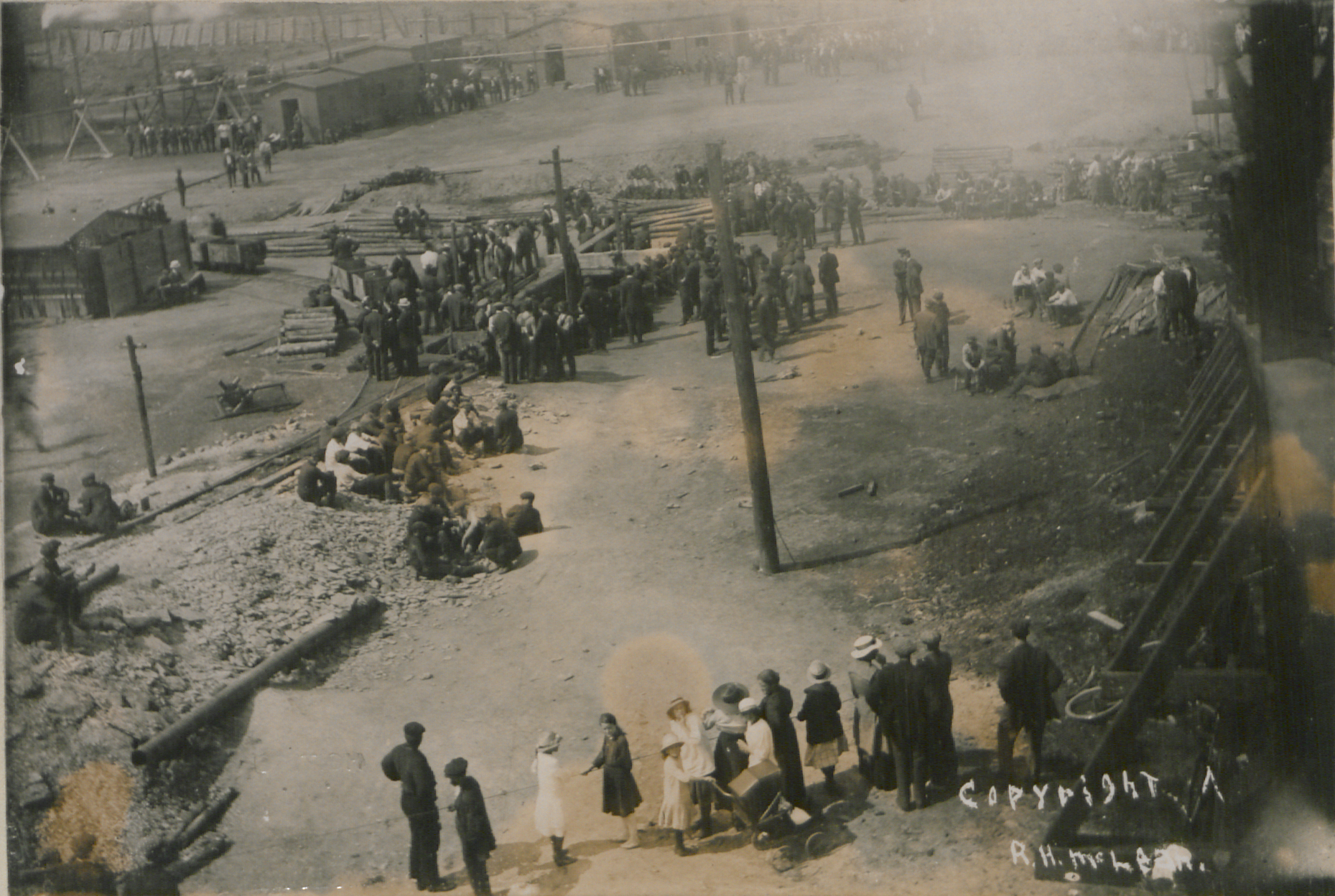
Mining Disaster at New Waterford, Nova Scotia, July 1917

== In popular culture ==
The town was the setting for the 1999 comedic coming-of-age film New Waterford Girl. Most scenes for the movie were filmed in North Sydney.

Canadian author Ann-Marie MacDonald set her #1 bestseller Fall on Your Knees in New Waterford during the early 20th century.

In recent years, two filmmakers from the community, Ashley McKenzie and Winston DeGiobbi, have gained attention for independent films shot in the area. McKenzie's works include Werewolf and Queens of the Qing Dynasty. DeGiobbi's notable work includes Mass for Shut-Ins.

== Clubs, events and celebrations ==
New Waterford is home to several clubs and chapters, including the Knights of Columbus, established in 1949; Army & Navy Branch 217; and The Royal Canadian Legion, Branch 015. Other local organizations include the New Waterford Kin Club (established 1971), the New Waterford Lions Club, the New Waterford Pensioners Club, the Food Bank, Friends of Colliery Lands Park, and a boxing club.

Several community societies and non-profits are active in New Waterford, including Combined Christmas Giving, which began in 1992 to provide support to residents in need during the holiday season.

=== Davis Day / Miners' Memorial Day ===
Davis Day / Miners' Memorial Day commemorates the death of Cape Breton miner William Davis, father of ten, who was shot by coal company security during a mining strike on 11 June 1925 at Waterford Lake. Davis was not participating in the protest, which took the form of a march from the company power plant to the railroad tracks between Daley Road and May Street. Two other men, Gilbert Watson and Jack MacQuarrie, were injured, and Michael O'Hadley was trampled by horses. Each year on 11 June, miners across Nova Scotia observe a day of remembrance for Davis and all miners who have died in the province's coal mines.

=== Coal Bowl ===
New Waterford hosts the annual Coal Bowl Classic basketball tournament, which draws teams from across Canada for a week-long event. The tournament, first held in 1981, takes place at Breton Education Centre in early February. In 2009, the Breton Education Centre Bears won the tournament for the first time, ending the so-called "Coal Bowl curse". The original Breton Education Centre building, which opened in September 1970, closed in June 2024. A new facility, constructed adjacent to the original site, opened in September 2024.

=== Coal Dust Days ===
Coal Dust Days is a week-long community celebration held around the third week of July, first established in 1985. Events include the Coal Dust Days parade, Plummer Avenue Day, a pub-crawl tavern tour, and a fireworks display.
