= Boundary Dam Power Station =

Power station in Saskatchewan, Canada

- Country: Canada
- Location: Estevan No. 5, near Estevan, Saskatchewan
- Coordinates: 49°5′47″N 103°1′49″W
- Status: Operational
- Commission date: 1959
- Owner: SaskPower

Thermal power station
- Primary fuel: Coal (lignite)
- Turbine technology: Steam turbine

Power generation
- Nameplate capacity: 531 megawatts

Boundary Dam Power Station is the largest coal fired station owned by SaskPower, located near Estevan, Saskatchewan, Canada.

== Description ==
The Boundary Dam Power Station consists of two 62 net MW units (commissioned in 1959, shut down and decommissioned in 2014); two 139 net MW units (commissioned in 1970), one of which—Unit 3—was decommissioned and replaced with a new 160 MW unit in 2013; one 139 net MW unit (commissioned in 1973); and one 273 net MW unit (commissioned in 1978).

The boilers are supplied by Babcock & Wilcox and Combustion Engineering while the turbines/generator are supplied by General Electric and Hitachi. There is also Boundary Dam (constructed in 1957) located next to the station. It is an earth fill dam, which created the Boundary Dam Reservoir on Long Creek a few kilometres west of the river's mouth on the Souris River. The station uses water from the reservoir for coolant, which is why Boundary Reservoir is the only body of water in Saskatchewan that doesn't freeze over during the winter months and supports largemouth bass.

The plant has five 300 ft (91.44 m) tall smokestacks. SaskPower has advised that the project has a 30-year life.

== Carbon capture and storage demonstration project ==
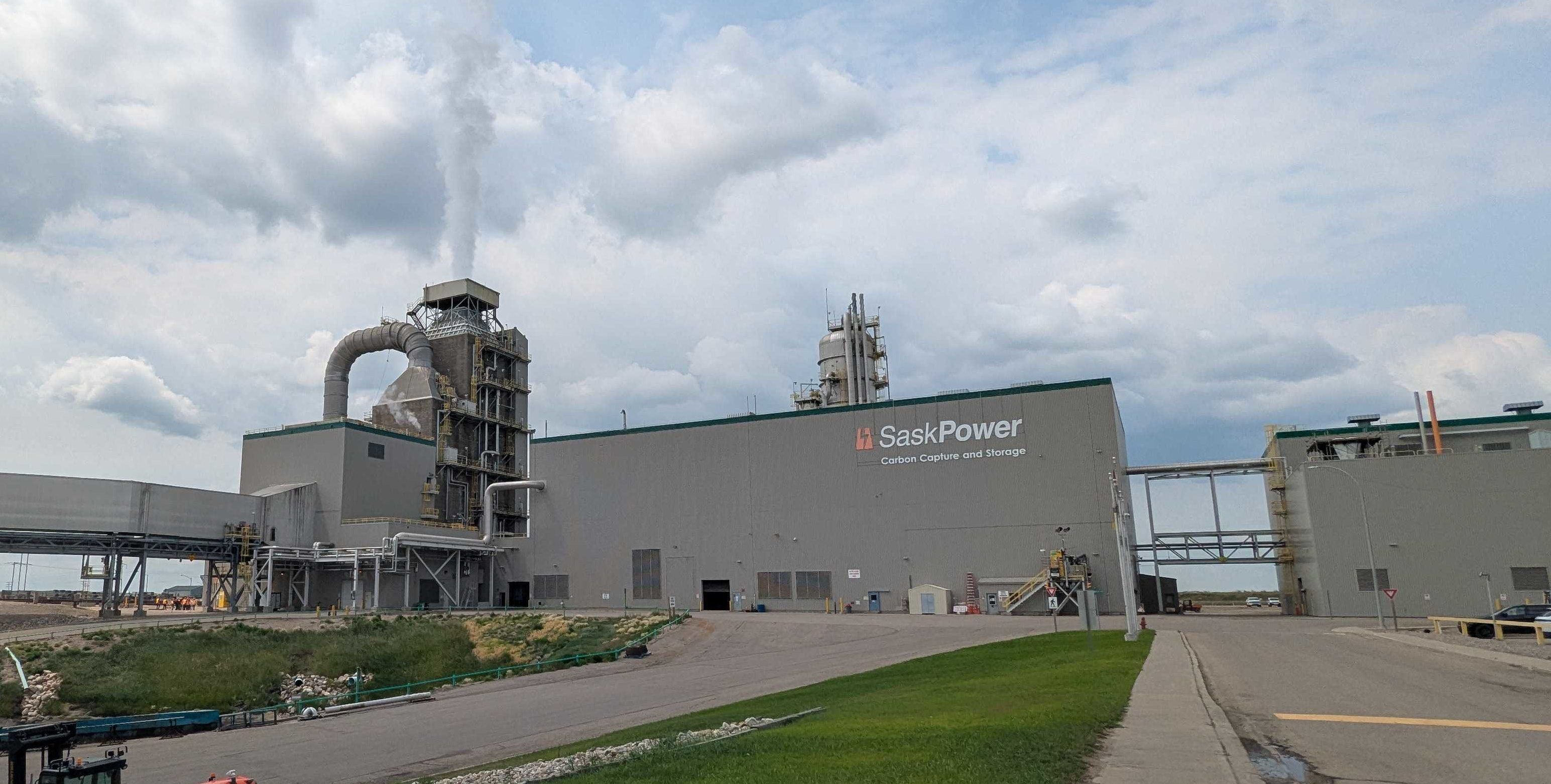
The carbon capture unit. On the right is the compressor building.

The Boundary Dam Integrated Carbon Capture and Storage Demonstration is a project to retrofit the lignite-fired Unit #3 with a carbon capture system. It consists of two distinct parts: Repowering of the existing Unit #3 and the installation of the carbon dioxide, sulfur dioxide and NOx capture facility. Its primary purpose is to provide a low-cost source of carbon dioxide, to the mature Weyburn Oil Field, for enhanced oil recovery. It is expected to result in a 90 percent (1 million tonnes/year) reduction in CO_{2} emissions and will also reduce the output of Unit 3 from 139 MW to 110 MW. Critics point out that the 90% figure refers to the percentage of total CO_{2} emissions captured, and that only about a half of this CO_{2} will actually be permanently stored. The remainder is released into the atmosphere during capturing and processing in the oil field. The retrofitted unit was officially opened in October 2014, and is the world's first commercial-scale, lignite-fired power plant equipped with carbon capture and storage technology

In 2015, internal documents from SaskPower revealed that there were "serious design issues" in the carbon capture system, resulting in regular breakdowns and maintenance problems that led the unit to only be operational 40% of the time. SNC-Lavalin had been contracted to engineer, procure, and build the facility, and the documents asserted that it "has neither the will or the ability to fix some of these fundamental flaws." The low productivity of the plant had in turn meant that SaskPower was only able to sell half of the 800,000 tonnes of captured carbon dioxide that it had contracted to sell to Cenovus Energy for use in enhanced oil recovery at a cost of $25 per tonne. In addition to the lost sales, this meant that SaskPower had been forced to pay Cenovus $12 million in penalties. In June 2016, and to avoid paying a $91-million penalty, SaskPower renegotiated its CO_{2} supply contract with Cenovus. That renegotiation means annual revenues are reduced from $25 million to "$16-17 million". Over the 30-year project life this represents reduced revenue of $240 million to $270 million and will further weaken the project economics. Cenovus sold its Saskatchewan interests in 2017 to Whitecap Resources.

Several major publications have noted what they deem poor economics of the project, among them The Economist, The Financial Times, The MIT Technology Review, and The New York Times. An April 2016 Parliamentary Budget Office report found that CCS at Boundary Dam doubles the price of electricity.

Financial concerns appear to fall into three main areas:

- negative earnings before interest, taxes, depreciation, and amortization, in part due to the pioneering nature of the project;.
- the existence of cheaper alternatives, such as wind turbines, which urgently need to be developed.
- the potential for substantial losses for initial investors (Saskatchewan taxpayers and SaskPower ratepayers), in excess of $1 billion

Among environmental concerns, critics note that while 90% of CO_{2} smokestack emissions are captured, only a portion is stored. Almost half of captured emissions end up being released in the atmosphere by processing in the oil field and the capturing process.

Among other concerns, critics point to the following:

- The foremost goal of the CCS project is to keep the aging plant from becoming a stranded asset.
- The unfair sharing of the costs, risks and benefits: Energy consumers are said to be saddled with a "very expensive carbon tax", while Saskatchewan's aging oil industry, namely Weyburn Consortium (formerly headed by Cenovus Energy), which owned the Weyburn oil field until it was sold in 2017 receives a "backdoor subsidy."

All of these concerns are compounded by a lack of transparency: As of 2015 the project operators had not presented any financial or environmental performance numbers.

In July 2018, SaskPower announced that it would not retrofit Units 4 and 5 with CCS, with minister responsible Dustin Duncan saying that the units were approaching their mandated shut down in 2024 and that natural gas is a cheaper option. Any units without CCS would have to be retired by 2030 under federal regulations.

In 2025, the Saskatchewan government and minister responsible for SaskPower Jeremy Harrison announced plans to refurbish all of its coal power plants to keep them operating until 2050, including Boundary Dam.

== Capital cost ==
In February 2008 the Saskatchewan government announced that it would proceed with a 7-year reconstruction and repowering of Boundary Dam's Unit 3. The initial project cost was C$1.24 billion out of which C$240-million was from the federal government. Budget over-runs have led to the plant having a total cost of some C$1.5 billion.

== Revenue ==
Other than the generation of electricity, the plant will have several by-products which will generate revenue.

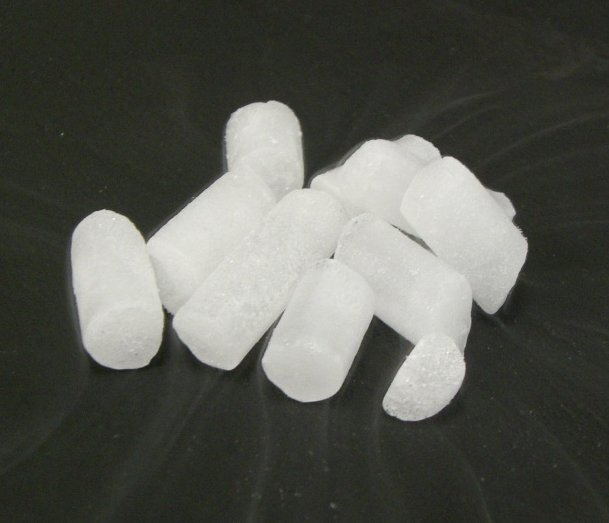
Sample of solid carbon dioxide or dry ice pellets

=== Carbon dioxide ===
The facility planned to capture 90 percent of total carbon dioxide emissions from Unit 3 or one million tonnes annually. However reports state that less than 90% of total carbon dioxide emissions are being captured.

Most of the total annual carbon dioxide capture volume, at least for the first ten years of the project, was sold to Alberta-based Cenovus Energy, the operator of the Weyburn Oil Field. SaskPower has not publicly disclosed the sale price but Minister Boyd has stated that it is "in the range of" $25 per tonne. Annual revenue from carbon dioxide sales is thus estimated at $25 million. Cenovus Energy used the carbon dioxide mainly for field injection work to increase crude oil production before its Saskatchewan operations were sold to Whitecap Resources.

=== Sulfuric acid ===
Most of the sulfur emissions from the power station (predominantly sulfur dioxide) will be captured, converted to sulfuric acid and sold. SaskPower sulphur dioxide emissions are approximately 5 tonnes per gigawatt hour of system generation. Given annual electricity generation of 1,010 gigawatt hours, it follows that total annual sulfur capture will be 5,050 tonnes.

=== Fly ash ===
Fly ash, also known as flue ash, is one of the residues generated following the combustion of coal and lignite. In the past it was released into the atmosphere through the smoke stack but pollution control requirements have put an end to that practice. It is now captured by electrostatic precipitators and stored at the point of generation, placed in landfills or recycled - where it will typically replace Portland Cement in concrete production. Typical fly ash recovery rates, for Saskatchewan lignite-fired power stations, are 31 kilograms per megawatt hour. Fly ash, depending on its use, can attract a range of prices. The best arises from concrete-quality ash which fetches $22–$49 per tonne.

== Expenses ==
There appear to be two main expense items: Operations and maintenance, and parasitic load. In the latter, carbon and sulfur dioxide amine-based capture units, such as the one at Boundary Dam, consume significant amounts of electricity and heat in operation and the largest single component is associated with solvent regeneration. Significant electrical load is also used to run additional emission control components (e.g. NOx and mercury capture) as well as associated pumps and other equipment.

== Gallery ==
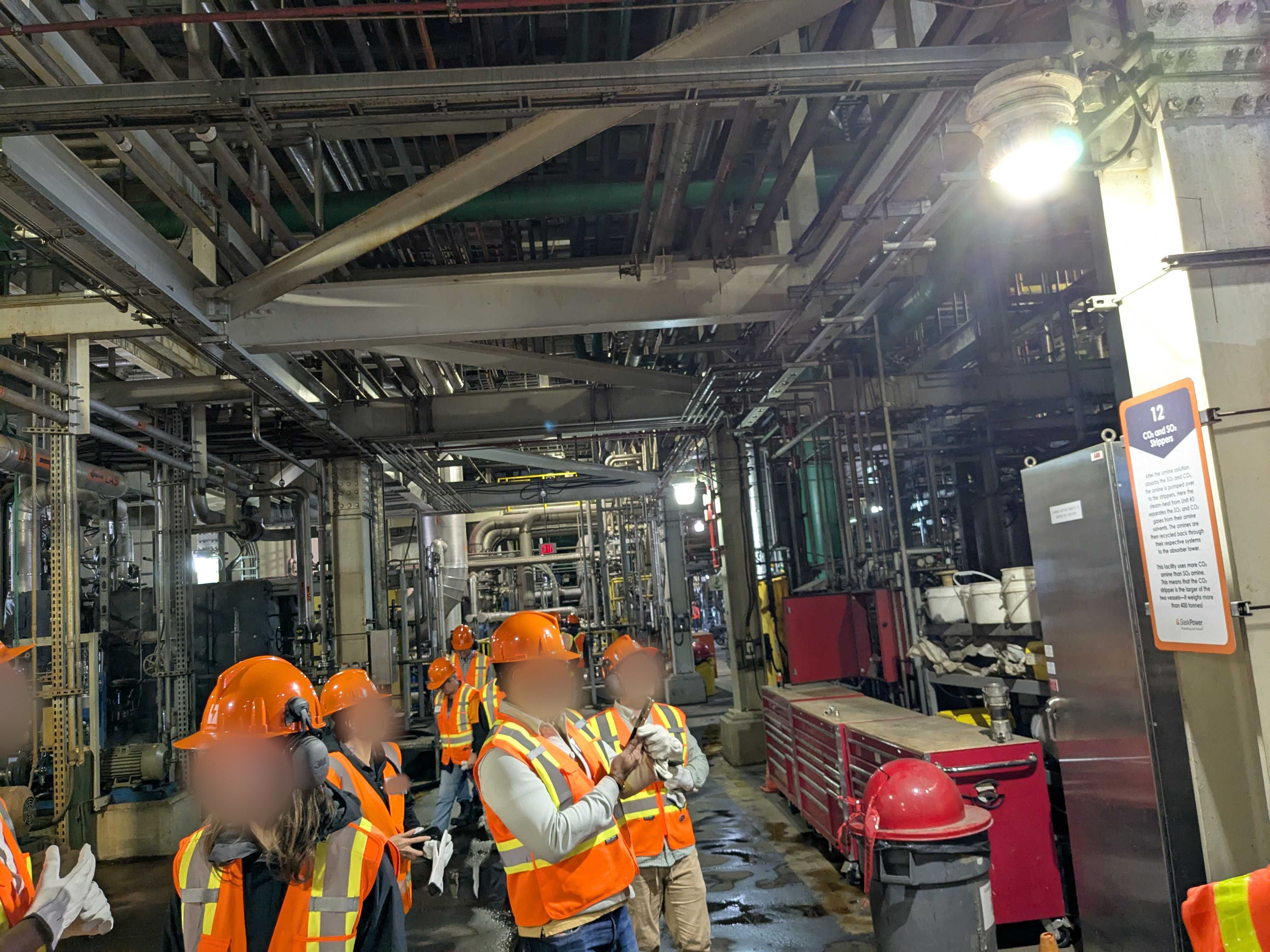
Interior of the capture plant

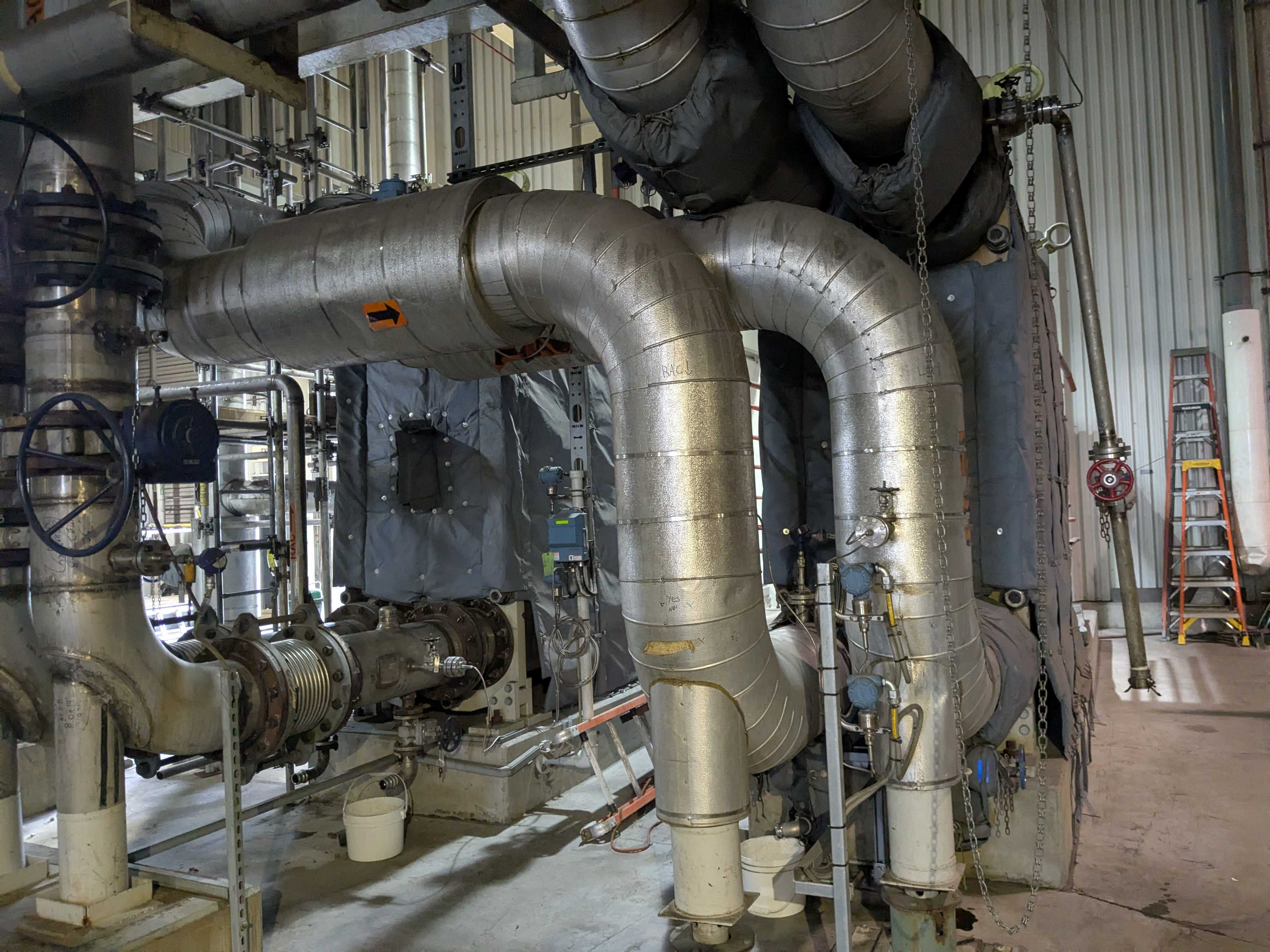
CO_{2} Lean/rich amine heat exchanger

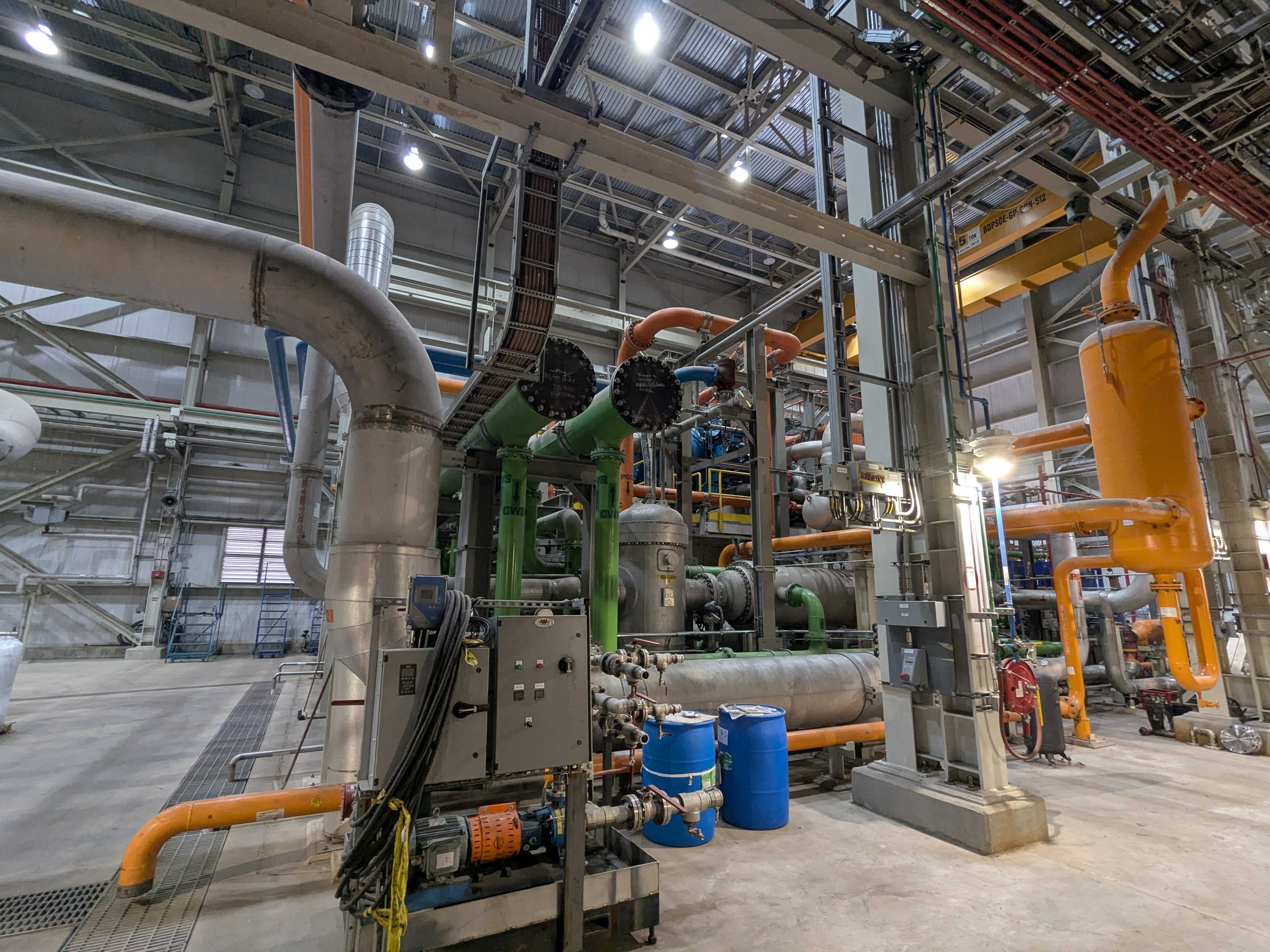
8 stage compressor that liquifies the captured CO_{2}

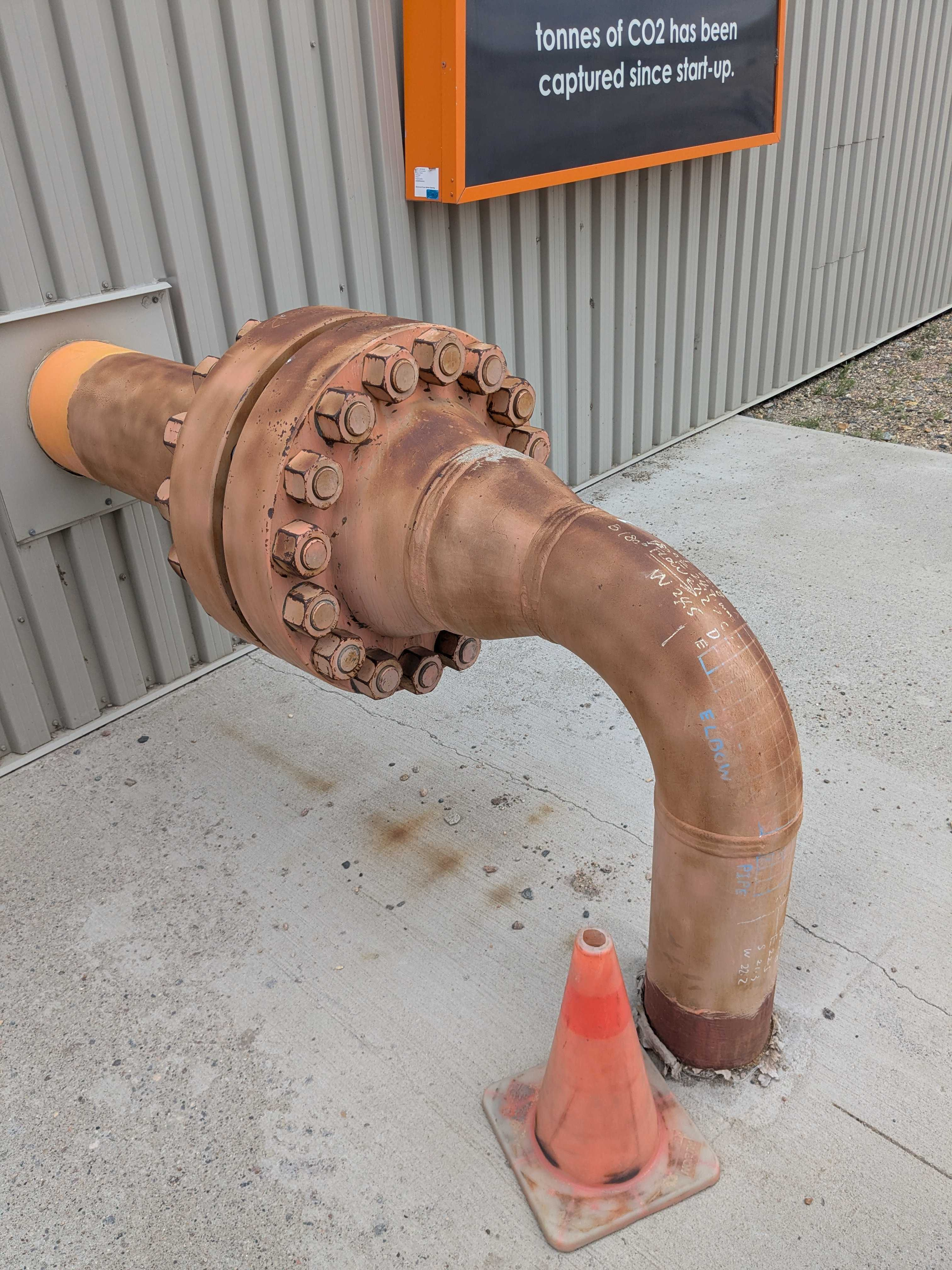
CO_{2} pipeline exiting the capture facility

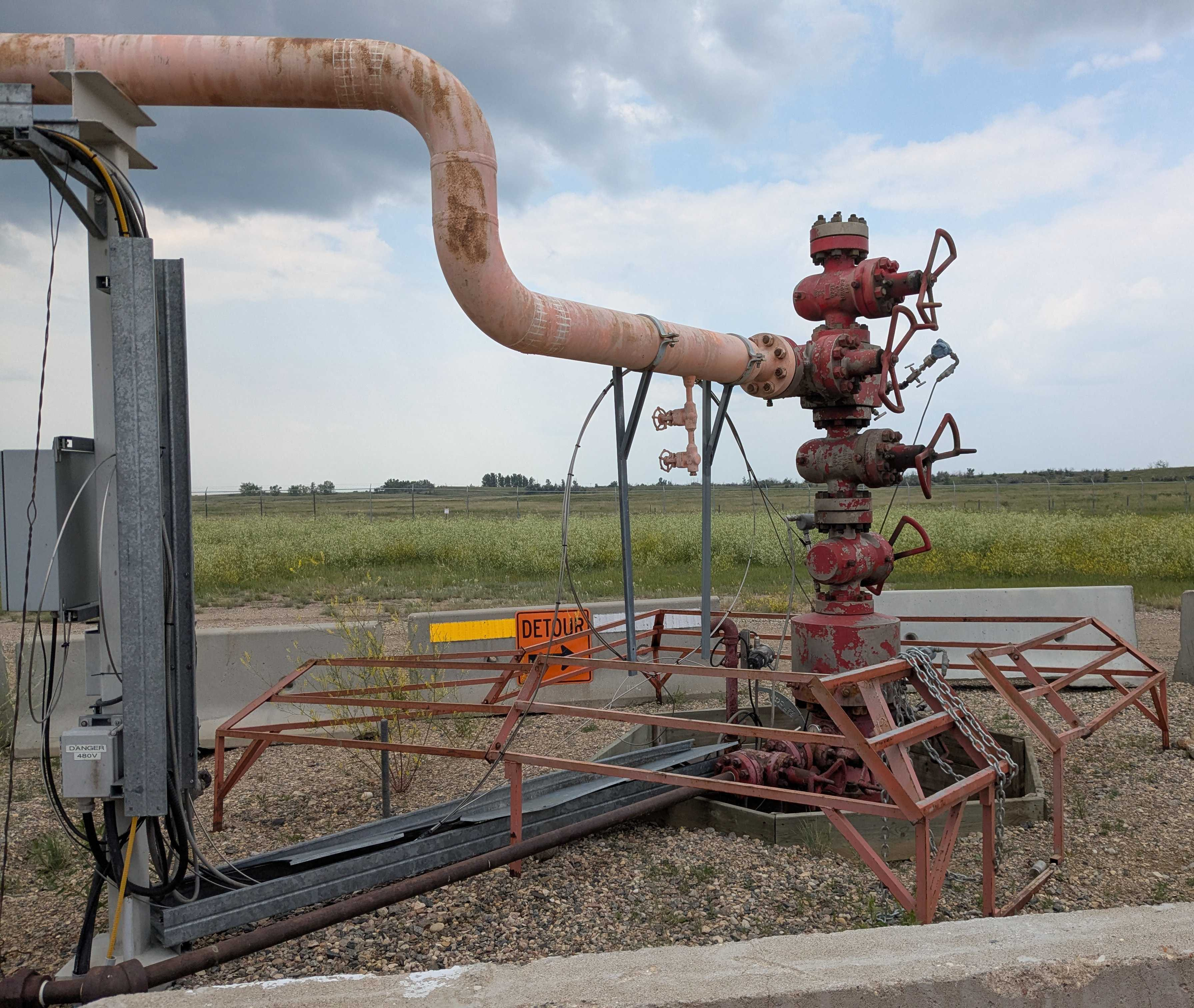
Wellhead at the Aquistore injection site. The CO_{2} that is not used for EOR is injected here for long term geological storage.

== See also ==
- List of generating stations in Saskatchewan
- Coal mining in Saskatchewan
- Shand Power Station
