= William Davis Miners' Memorial Day =

Observance in Canada

Davis Day, also known as Miners' Memorial Day (and since November 25, 2008, officially as William Davis Miners' Memorial Day) is an annual day of remembrance observed on June 11 in coal mining communities in Nova Scotia, Canada to recognize all miners killed in the province's coal mines.

== Origins ==
Davis Day originated in memory of William Davis, a coal miner who was killed by company police during a long strike of the province's coal miners against the British Empire Steel Corporation. The key events took place at Waterford Lake, near the town of New Waterford in the industrial district of Cape Breton Island. At the start of the strike in March 1925, the corporation cut off credit at the company stores, and the coal miners survived on relief payments and donations from supporters as far away as Boston and Winnipeg. After three months, the corporation planned to resume operations without a settlement. In response, at the beginning of June the coal miners reinforced the shutdown by taking control of the power plant that served the mines in the New Waterford district and also supplied water and power to the town. The shortage of water caused inconvenience and concern to citizens, but the coal miners accessed local wells and set up a volunteer service to deliver water to the hospital.

The situation turned critical in the early hours of June 11, 1925, when a force of company police recaptured the power plant. Hundreds of coal miners, possibly more than 2,000 in number, marched to Waterford Lake in protest. The thirty-eight-year-old William Davis was among them. The company police started shooting and fired more than 300 shots. Davis was shot and killed, either by deliberate aim or by a stray bullet, and several other miners were wounded. In the following days, company facilities, including the stores, were looted and vandalized. The Canadian army was called out to police the district. A provincial election followed later that month, and the new government arranged for a settlement of the strike and continued recognition of the union.

== Commemoration ==
In commemoration of Davis's sacrifice, the United Mine Workers of America designated the day in his honour, with miners in Nova Scotia vowing never to work on June 11. Davis Day was renamed District Memorial Day in 1938 (after District 26, UMWA) and in 1970, the date was changed to the second Monday in June. In 1974, however, these changes were reverted, with the original name (Davis Day) and the date (June 11) being restored. For the remainder of the 20th century, the pledge of never working on June 11 was maintained and Davis Day was observed as a quasi-civic holiday in most mining communities. The closure of Nova Scotia's last coal mine in November 2001 by the Cape Breton Development Corporation (DEVCO) threatened to mute the importance of Davis Day, but it has remained a day of remembrance for all workers killed in the mines in the province.

Davis Day ceremonies are held regularly in Cape Breton; Florence holds a service yearly and the other mining communities like Glace Bay, New Waterford and Port Morien combine forces and rotate hosting communities. Stellarton and Springhill in mainland Nova Scotia also hold Davis Day services, with other mining communities in the province like Westville and River Hebert also recognizing the day. Memorial events have also been held in Minto and Chipman, New Brunswick where coal miners were also represented by the UMWA.

In 1994, 1996, and 1999, private members' bills to officially designate June 11 as Davis (Miners' Memorial) Day were introduced in the Nova Scotia House of Assembly. They did not proceed past first reading. In 2008 a private member's bill to officially designate June 11 as William Davis Miners' Memorial Day was introduced and passed.
