= Rural Municipality of Estevan No. 5 =

Rural municipality in Saskatchewan, Canada

Estevan No. 5
- Rural municipality
- Rural Municipality of Estevan No. 5
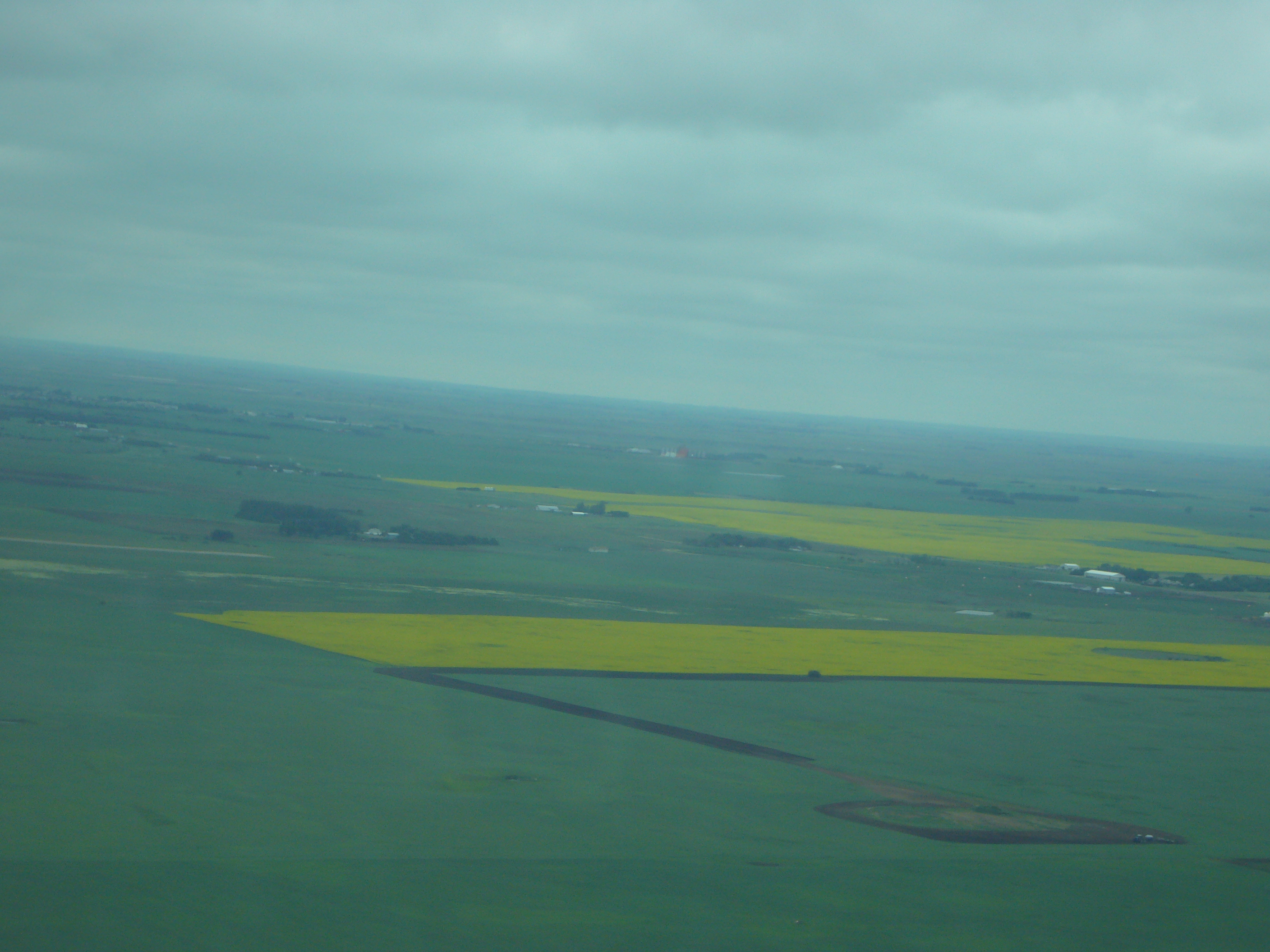

- Location of the RM of Estevan No. 5 in Saskatchewan
- Coordinates: 49.132°N 102.976°W
- Country: Canada
- Province: Saskatchewan
- Census division: 1
- SARM division: 1
- Federal riding: Souris—Moose Mountain
- Provincial riding: Estevan
- Formed: December 12, 1910

Government
  - Reeve: Jason LeBlanc
  - Governing body: RM of Estevan No. 5 Council
  - Administrator: Michelle Dickie
  - Office location: Estevan

Area (2021)
  - Land: 772 km^{2} (298 sq mi)

Population (2021)
  - Total: 1,279
  - Density: 1.7/km^{2} (4.4/sq mi)
- Time zone: CST
  - Summer (DST): CST
- Postal code: S4A 0T8
- Area codes: 306 and 639
- Website: rmestevan.ca

The Rural Municipality of Estevan No. 5 (2016 population: 1,370) is a rural municipality (RM) in the Canadian province of Saskatchewan within Census Division No. 1 and SARM Division No. 1. Located in the southeast portion of the province, it surrounds the City of Estevan. The RM is adjacent to the United States border, neighbouring Divide County and Burke County in North Dakota.

== History ==
The RM of Estevan No. 5 incorporated as a rural municipality on December 12, 1910.

== Geography ==
=== Communities and localities ===
The following urban municipalities are surrounded by the RM.

Cities

- Estevan

Villages

- Hitchcock

=== Parks and recreation ===
The following parks are within the RM:

- Woodlawn Regional Park

== Demographics ==
Census population history
Year	Pop.	±%
1981	1,185	—
1986	1,270	+7.2%
1991	1,139	−10.3%
1996	1,078	−5.4%
2001	1,055	−2.1%
2006	1,051	−0.4%
2011	1,139	+8.4%
2016	1,370	+20.3%
2021	1,279	−6.6%
Source: Statistics Canada via Saskatchewan Bureau of Statistics

In the 2021 Census of Population conducted by Statistics Canada, the RM of Estevan No. 5 had a population of 1,279 living in 474 of its 527 total private dwellings, a change of −6.6% from its 2016 population of 1,370. With a land area of 772 km^{2} (298 sq mi), it had a population density of 1.7/km^{2} (4.3/sq mi) in 2021.

In the 2016 Census of Population, the RM of Estevan No. 5 recorded a population of 1,370 living in 487 of its 525 total private dwellings, a 20.3% change from its 2011 population of 1,139. With a land area of 773.38 km^{2} (298.60 sq mi), it had a population density of 1.8/km^{2} (4.6/sq mi) in 2016.

== Government ==
The RM of Estevan No. 5 is governed by an elected municipal council and an appointed administrator that meets on the second and fourth Wednesday of every month. The reeve of the RM is Jason LeBlanc while its administrator is Michelle Dickie. The RM's office is located in the City of Estevan.

== See also ==
- List of rural municipalities in Saskatchewan
