= Shand Power Station =

Power station in Saskatchewan, Canada

- Shand Power Station in 2026
- Country: Canada
- Location: Estevan No. 5, near Estevan, Saskatchewan
- Coordinates: 49°5′18″N 102°51′50″W
- Status: Operational
- Commission date: 1992
- Owner: SaskPower

Thermal power station
- Primary fuel: Coal

Power generation
- Nameplate capacity: 279 MW

External links
- Commons: Related media on Commons

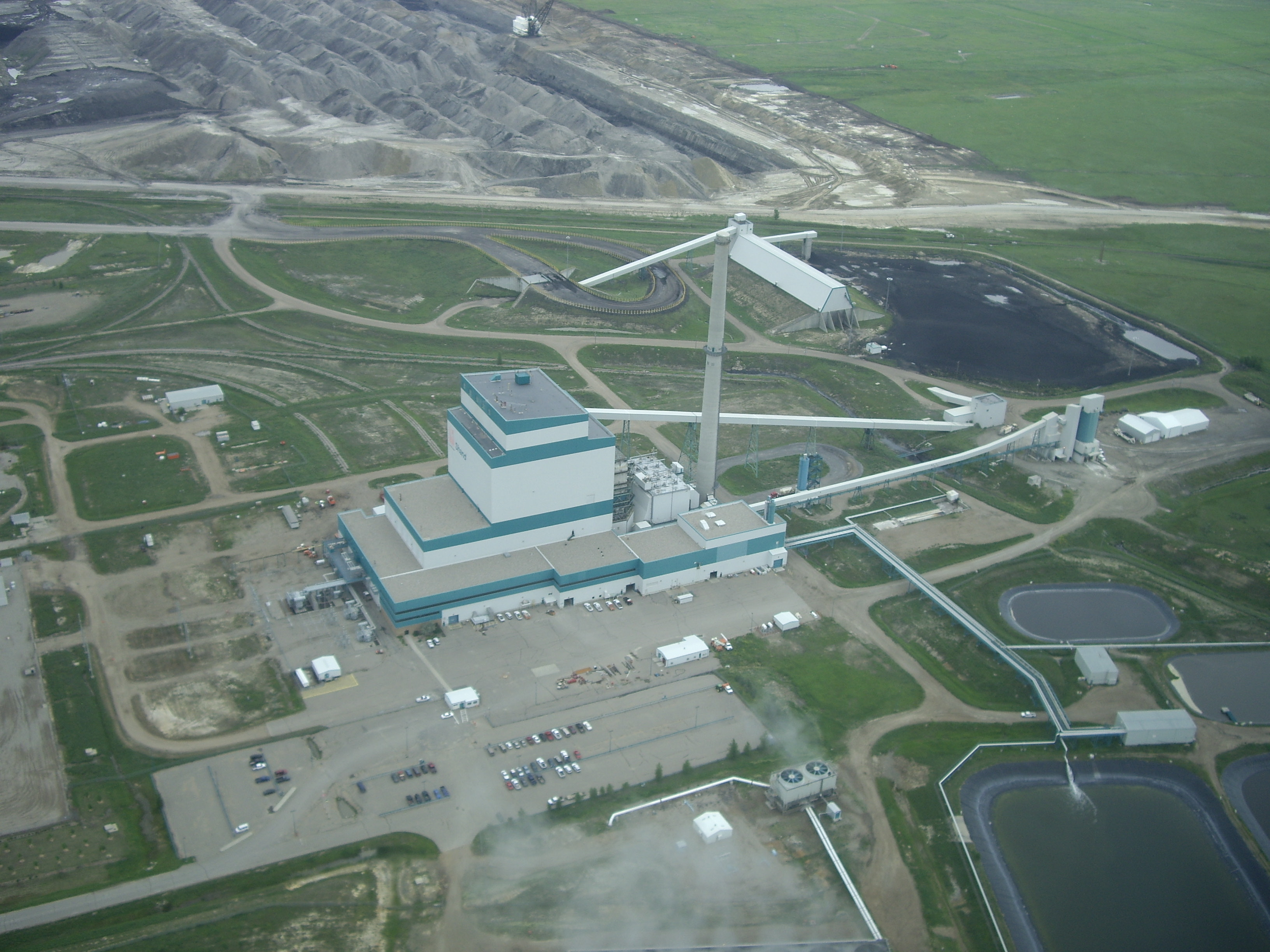
Shand Power Station from above

Shand Power Station is a coal fired station owned by SaskPower in the Canadian province of Saskatchewan, near the city of Estevan.

== Description ==
The Shand Power Station consists of:

- one 279 net MW unit (commissioned in 1992)
- advanced environmental controls through a LIFAC (Limestone Injection into the Furnace and reActivation of Calcium) system

The boilers are supplied by Babcock & Wilcox and the turbines/generator are supplied by Hitachi. The site is sized to also support a second unit. A single 148 m (486 ft) smokestack is located at the plant, the tallest freestanding structure in Saskatchewan.

SaskPower opened its Carbon Capture Test Facility at Shand in 2015 as a joint venture with partners Mitsubishi and Hitachi to research carbon capture and storage technology that was later implemented at the Boundary Dam Power Station. The Shand test facility has been vacant since 2021.

The unit at Shand was slated for retirement by 2030 under federal regulations unless it was converted to natural gas generation or a full scale carbon capture system was installed, which a 2018 feasibility study estimated would cost around $1 billion. But in June 2025, the Saskatchewan government announced plans to refurbish its coal power plants, including Shand, to extend their lifespans to 2050.

== Shand Greenhouses ==
Shand Greenhouse was built in 1991 near the power station and is part of an initiative to offset the environmental impact of burning coal. The greenhouse grows and distribute seedlings free of charge to schools, communities and individuals for conservation and wildlife habitat projects.

The species of trees that are grown and given to the communities include: buffaloberry, bur oak, choke cherry, Colorado blue spruce, eastern red cedar, green ash, jack pine, lodgepole pine, Manitoba maple, pin cherry, plains cottonwood, red alder, red-osier dogwood, Saskatoon berry, Scots pine, sea-buckthorn, shrub willow, Siberian crab, Siberian larch, trembling aspen or white poplar, villosa lilac, western sandcherry, white birch or paper birch, willow, and Woods' rose.

SaskPower began a major renovation project at the greenhouse in 2026, with no new seedlings planted during the construction work. Plans are in place to resume seedling distribution in March 2028.

== See also ==
- Boundary Dam Power Station
- List of power stations in Canada
- List of generating stations in Saskatchewan
- List of tallest smokestacks in Canada
