= List of generating stations in Nova Scotia =

This is a list of electrical generating stations in Nova Scotia, Canada.

Nova Scotia has twenty-nine power stations, and is still largely dependent on coal-fired generation, with some natural gas and hydroelectric generating stations. Nova Scotia Power, a subsidiary of Emera, operates the integrated public utility serving most of the province.

Decommissioned facilities (year)

== Fossil fuel ==
Name	Location	Capacity (MW)	Date	Owner	Type	Ref
Burnside Combustion Turbine	44°42′54″N 63°36′35″W	132		Nova Scotia Power	Fuel oil	
Lingan Generating Station	46°14′12″N 60°2′14″W	600	(1979-1984)	Nova Scotia Power	Coal	
Point Aconi Generating Station	46°19′12″N 60°19′50″W	171	(1994)	Nova Scotia Power	Coal / petroleum coke	
Point Tupper Generating Station	45°35′14″N 61°20′53″W	154	(1973)	Nova Scotia Power	Coal	
Trenton Generating Station	45°37′13″N 62°38′53″W	307	(1969)	Nova Scotia Power	Coal	
Tufts Cove Generating Station	44°40′35″N 63°35′46″W	415	(1965)	Nova Scotia Power	Fuel oil / natural gas	
Tusket Combustion Turbine	43°51′38″N 65°59′35″W	24		Nova Scotia Power	Fuel oil	
Victoria Junction Combustion Turbines	46°9′43″N 60°6′46″W	66		Nova Scotia Power	Fuel oil	

== Renewable ==
=== Biomass ===
List of biomass power plants in Nova Scotia.

Name	Location	Capacity (MW)	Date	Owner	Ref
Brooklyn Energy Centre	Brooklyn	27		Emera Energy	
Port Hawkesbury Biomass	Port Hawkesbury	63.1		Nova Scotia Power	

=== Hydro ===
List of hydroelectric and tidal generating stations in Nova Scotia.

Name	Location	Capacity (MW)	Date	Owner	Ref
Annapolis	Annapolis	4		Nova Scotia Power	
Annapolis Royal Generating Station	44°45′07″N 65°30′40″W	20	1984–2019	Nova Scotia Power	
Avon	Avon	7		Nova Scotia Power	
Bear River	Bear River	13		Nova Scotia Power	
Black River	Black River	23		Nova Scotia Power	
Dickie Brook	Dickie Brook	4		Nova Scotia Power	
Factorydale	44.987676°N 64.782306°W	0.52		Berwick Electric	
Fall River	Fall River	1		Nova Scotia Power	
Lequille	Dugway Road	11		Nova Scotia Power	
Mersey	Mersey	43		Nova Scotia Power	
Nictaux	Nictaux	7		Nova Scotia Power	
Paradise	Paradise	5		Nova Scotia Power	
Roseway	Roseway	2		Nova Scotia Power	
Sheet Harbour	44.98656°N 62.48313°W	11		Nova Scotia Power	
Sissiboo	Sissiboo	24		Nova Scotia Power	
St. Margaret's Bay Hydro	44.69145°N 63.8917°W	11	(1922)	Nova Scotia Power	
Tusket	43.88204°N 65.97775°W	2		Nova Scotia Power	
Wreck Cove Hydroelectric System	46.531317°N 60.440333°W	215	(1978)	Nova Scotia Power	

=== Wind ===
List of wind farms in Nova Scotia.

Name	Location	Capacity (MW)	Date	Owner	Ref
Amherst I Wind Farm	Amherst	31.5		Sprott Power Corporation	
Dalhousie Mountain Wind Farm	Mount Thom	51		RMS Energy	
Digby Neck Wind Project	Digby Neck	30		Sprott Power Corporation	
Ellershouse	Hants County	23	2017	Bullfrog Power	
Glen Dhu Wind Farm	Merigomish	62	2011	Capstone	
Lingan Power Project	Lingan	17.5		Confederation Power	
Higgins Mountain Wind Project	Cobequid Mountains	3.6		Sprott Power Corporation	
Nuttby Wind Farm	Nuttby Mountain	51	2010	Nova Scotia Limited	
Pubnico Point	Pubnico	30.6		NextEra	
South Canoe Wind Project	Lunenburg County	102	2015	Minas Basin Pulp and Power	
Springhill Wind Project	Springhill	3.6		Sprott Power Corporation	
Ellershouse	Hants County	23.15		Alternative Resource Energy Authority	

== See also ==
- Nova Scotia Power
- Energy in Canada
- List of power stations in Canada
