= Point Aconi =

Point Aconi can refer to several things:

- Point Aconi, Nova Scotia, a community on Boularderie Island.
- Point Aconi Generating Station, a power plant in the same community.
