= Nuttby Mountain =

Mountain in Canada

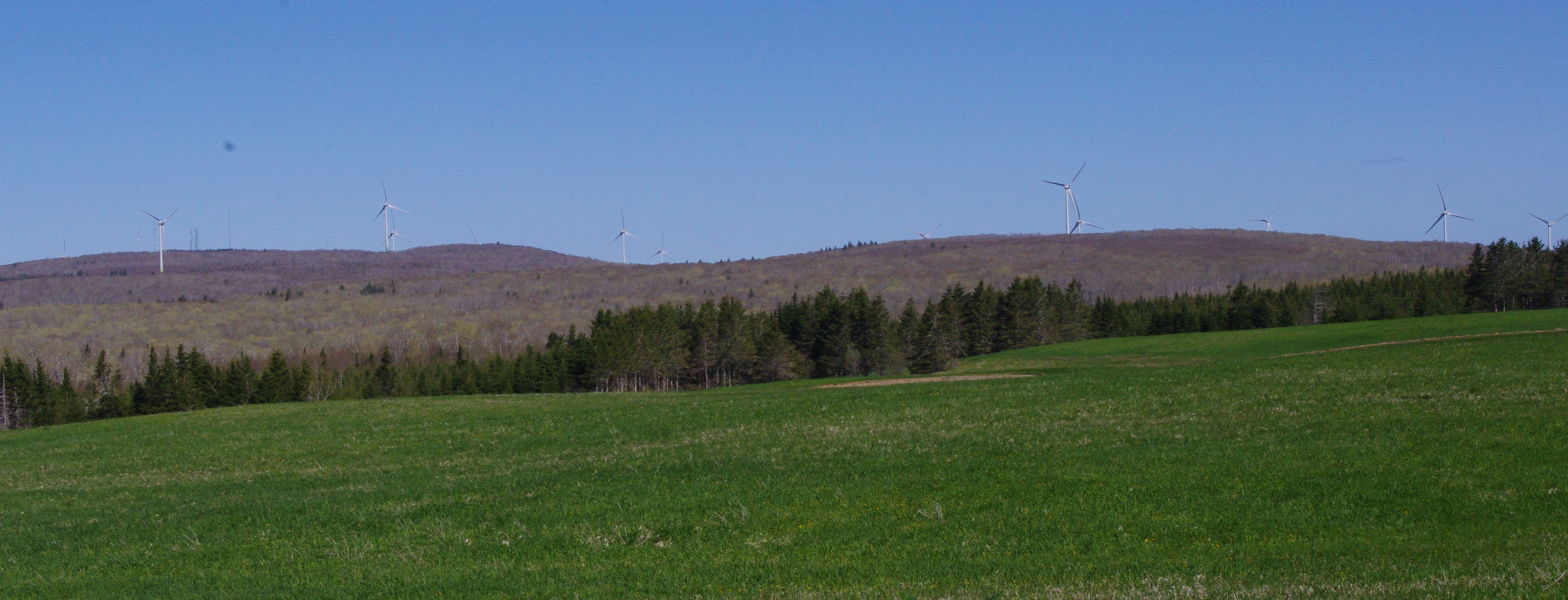
- View of nuttby Mountain from Highway 311, showing windturbines and communication towers

Highest point
- Elevation: 360 m (1,180 ft)
- Coordinates: 45°33′17.42″N 63°13′26.71″W

Geography
- Location: Colchester County, Nova Scotia
- Parent range: Cobequid Mountains
- Topo map: NTS 11E11 Tatamagouche

Climbing
- Easiest route: drive/hike

Nuttby Mountain is a Canadian peak in the Cobequid Mountains and at 360.6 metres is one of the highest elevation points on the mainland portion of Nova Scotia.

Located west of Route 311 in Colchester County some 20 km north of Truro, the peak is accessible by vehicle using a gated road and is topped by telecommunication towers. A fire lookout tower stood there from 1937 to 2013. A 45-megawatt wind farm was constructed on a 400-acre site on the mountain in 2010. As of 2017 Nova Scotia Power owned 22 Enercon E82 turbines on the site with a total capacity of 50.6 MW.

== See also ==
- List of highest points of Canadian provinces and territories
- Nuttby, Nova Scotia, nearby settlement
