= Point Aconi, Nova Scotia =

Community in Nova Scotia, Canada

Coordinates: 46°19′6.8″N 60°18′31.1″W

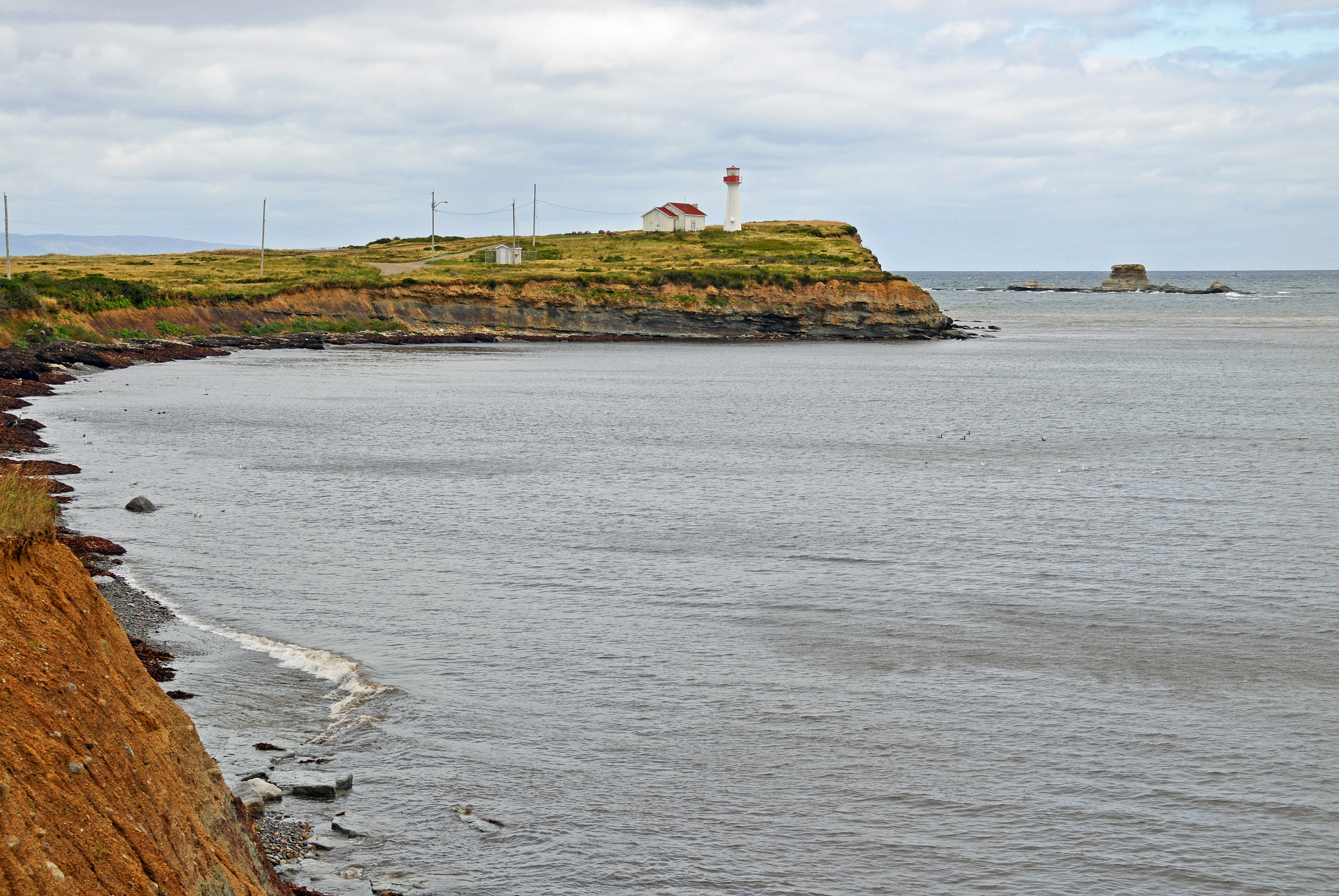
Point Aconi

Point Aconi (2021 pop. 113) is a rural community in the Canadian province of Nova Scotia, located at the northeastern tip of Boularderie Island. It derives its name from the headland of the same name, Point Aconi.

Point Aconi is located in the Cape Breton Regional Municipality and fronts the Cabot Strait along the northeastern shore of Boularderie Island.

== Demographics ==
In the 2021 Census of Population conducted by Statistics Canada, Point Aconi had a population of 113 living in 56 of its 59 total private dwellings, a change of -15.7% from its 2016 population of 134. With a land area of 10.11 km^{2} (3.90 sq mi), it had a population density of 11.2/km^{2} (28.9/sq mi) in 2021.

== Coal mining ==
New Harbour in Nova Scotia

The region sits over the northern end of the Sydney Coal Field, a large coal field which extends at an angle under the Cabot Strait. Specifically, the Point Aconi area is home to the Hub coal seam of the Sydney Mines Formation (Upper Carboniferous).

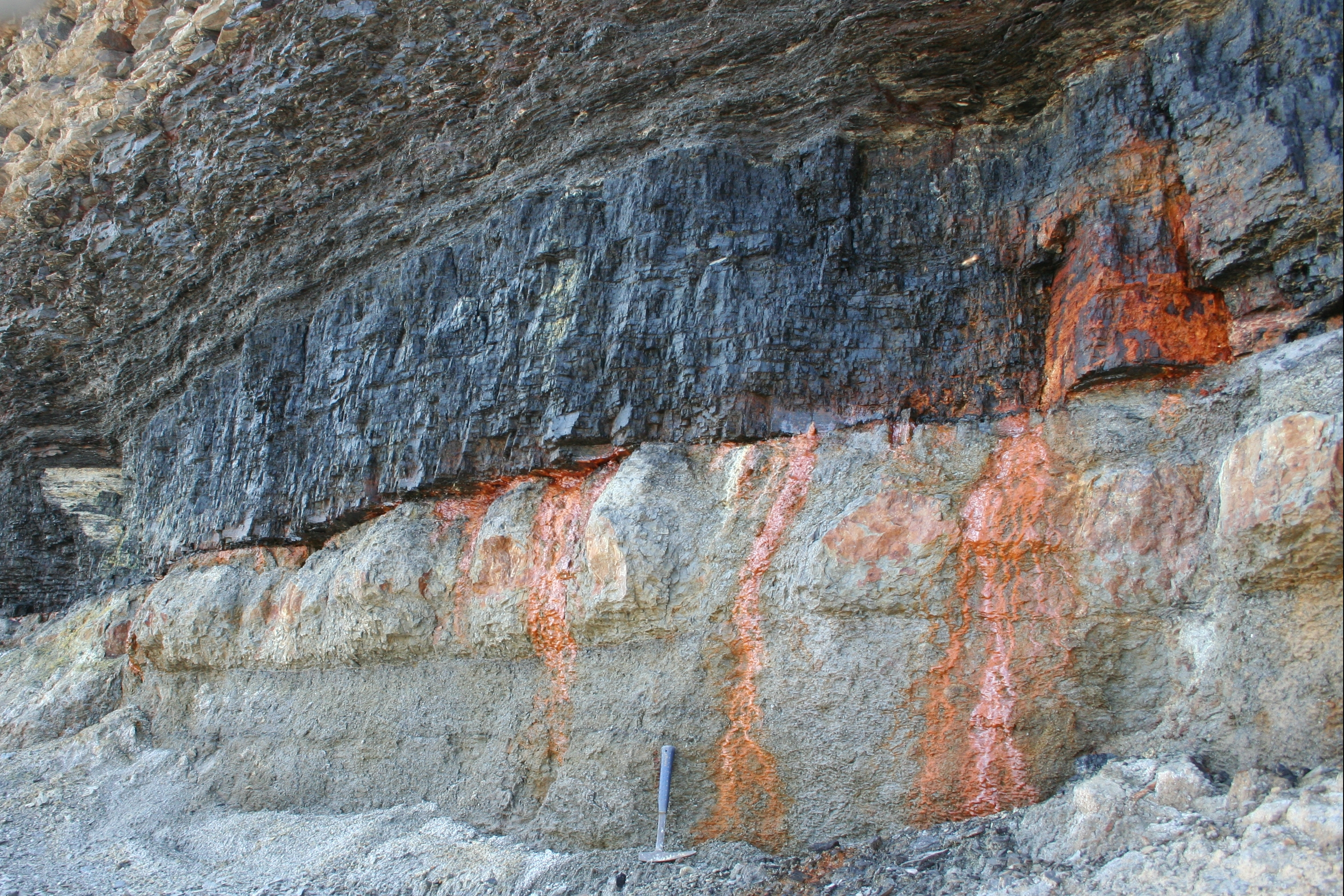
Point Aconi coal seam

As such, the area around Point Aconi has been commercially mined since the early 19th century, first by the General Mining Association (GMA), then by the Nova Scotia Steel and Coal Company (SCOTIA) and later the British Empire Steel Corporation (BESCO) and its successors, the Dominion Steel and Coal Corporation (DOSCO) and the federal Crown corporation Cape Breton Development Corporation (DEVCO).

Point Aconi was home to the last underground coal mine in operation in Nova Scotia, the Prince Colliery, which was opened by DEVCO during the global energy crisis in the early 1970s. A limited access road, Highway 162, was constructed from the Trans-Canada Highway Highway 105 to the south in order to relieve local roads of traffic congestion during shift changes at the mine, as well as from dump trucks hauling the coal.

The then-provincial Crown corporation Nova Scotia Power Corp. constructed the Point Aconi Generating Station adjacent to the mine in the early 1990s to take advantage of the readily available fuel source.

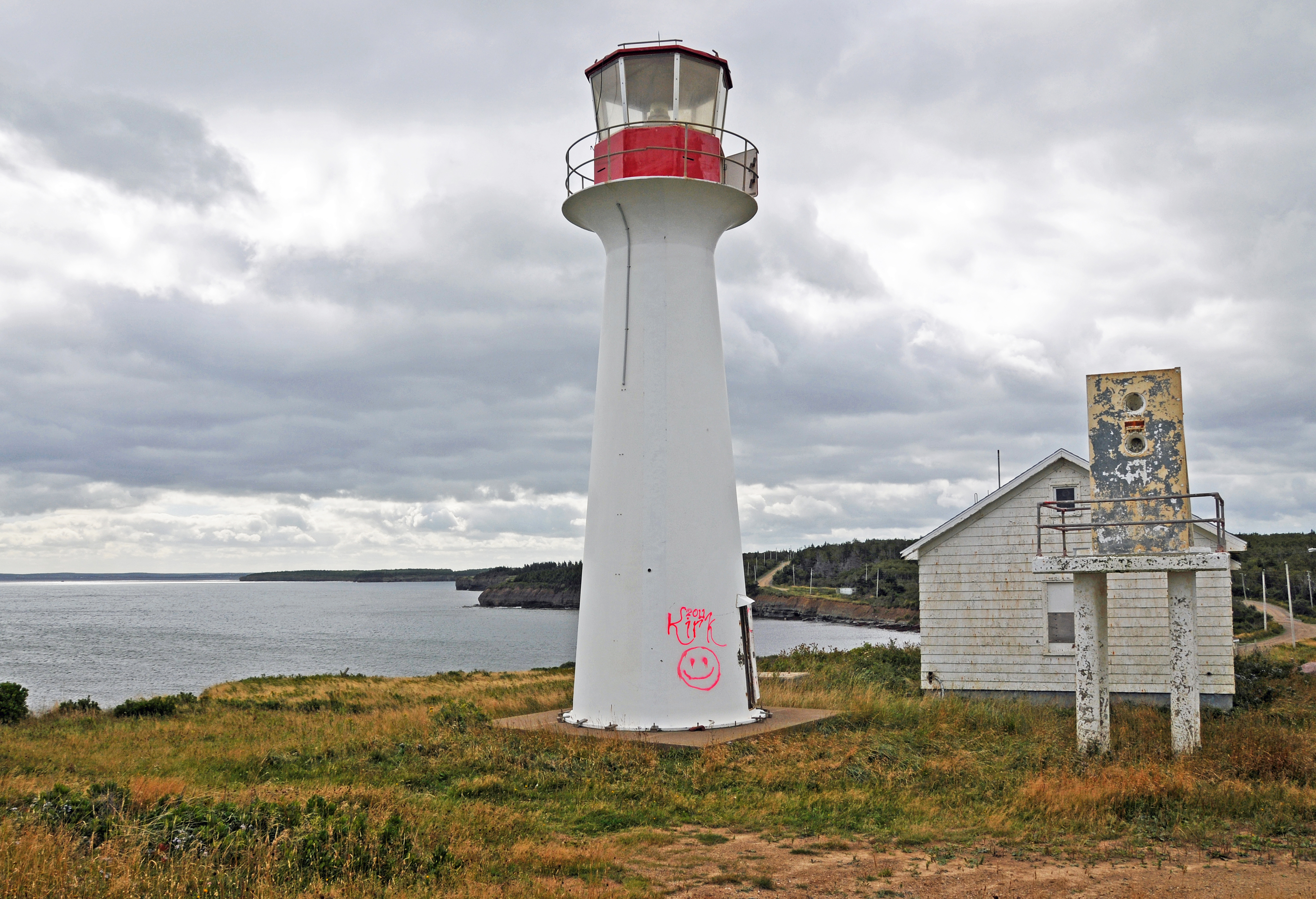
The Point Aconi lighthouse was lost to fire in 2014

The Prince mine was closed in November 2001, ending underground mining in Nova Scotia. However, the Point Aconi GS continues to operate as it is the most modern thermal generating station in Nova Scotia and provides lower emissions than older plants of a similar size.

Following the closure, several proposals were made to strip mine remaining coal deposits near the surface in the Point Aconi area. However, the proposal met with strong community opposition, citing fears of contamination and changes to groundwater supplies, as well as industrial nuisance through deteriorated air quality and noise which would lead to lower property values. Eventually, Pioneer Coal Limited was granted permission to conduct a reclamation mining operation starting in 2006. By 2012, some 25% of the area had been reclaimed.

== Lighthouse ==
A lighthouse was first erected at Point Aconi in 1874. The last lighthouse, a glass fibre tower standing 11 metres (36 ft) tall, was erected in 1989. It was destroyed by fire in 2014.

== Climate ==
The highest temperature ever recorded in Point Aconi was 36.0 °C (96.8 °F) on 10 August 2001, and the coldest temperature ever recorded was −27.0 °C (−16.6 °F) on 8 February 1993.

Climate data for Point Aconi Generating Station, 1981–2010 normals, extremes 1990–present
Month	Jan	Feb	Mar	Apr	May	Jun	Jul	Aug	Sep	Oct	Nov	Dec	Year
Record high °C (°F)	16.7 (62.1)	17.1 (62.8)	22.7 (72.9)	24.7 (76.5)	28.1 (82.6)	33.1 (91.6)	33.5 (92.3)	36.0 (96.8)	32.3 (90.1)	26.8 (80.2)	19.7 (67.5)	17.6 (63.7)	36.0 (96.8)
Mean daily maximum °C (°F)	−0.6 (30.9)	−1.2 (29.8)	2.1 (35.8)	6.0 (42.8)	12.9 (55.2)	19.3 (66.7)	23.4 (74.1)	23.8 (74.8)	19.6 (67.3)	13.3 (55.9)	7.3 (45.1)	2.7 (36.9)	10.7 (51.3)
Daily mean °C (°F)	−4.4 (24.1)	−5.3 (22.5)	−1.7 (28.9)	2.5 (36.5)	8.2 (46.8)	14.2 (57.6)	18.5 (65.3)	19.2 (66.6)	15.4 (59.7)	9.6 (49.3)	4.4 (39.9)	−0.4 (31.3)	6.7 (44.1)
Mean daily minimum °C (°F)	−8.2 (17.2)	−9.4 (15.1)	−5.4 (22.3)	−1.0 (30.2)	3.4 (38.1)	9.0 (48.2)	13.5 (56.3)	14.5 (58.1)	11.2 (52.2)	5.9 (42.6)	1.4 (34.5)	−3.5 (25.7)	2.6 (36.7)
Record low °C (°F)	−23.3 (−9.9)	−27.0 (−16.6)	−25.4 (−13.7)	−13.0 (8.6)	−6.0 (21.2)	−2.0 (28.4)	3.0 (37.4)	4.3 (39.7)	−0.6 (30.9)	−4.1 (24.6)	−7.7 (18.1)	−21.0 (−5.8)	−27.0 (−16.6)
Average precipitation mm (inches)	127.6 (5.02)	113.8 (4.48)	131.6 (5.18)	117.5 (4.63)	103.6 (4.08)	70.1 (2.76)	98.1 (3.86)	74.3 (2.93)	119.5 (4.70)	155.0 (6.10)	132.8 (5.23)	137.7 (5.42)	1,381.4 (54.39)
Average rainfall mm (inches)	72.0 (2.83)	60.2 (2.37)	93.0 (3.66)	91.7 (3.61)	103.3 (4.07)	70.1 (2.76)	98.1 (3.86)	74.3 (2.93)	119.5 (4.70)	155.0 (6.10)	127.0 (5.00)	103.4 (4.07)	1,164.4 (45.84)
Average snowfall cm (inches)	55.6 (21.9)	53.6 (21.1)	38.6 (15.2)	25.8 (10.2)	0.3 (0.1)	0.0 (0.0)	0.0 (0.0)	0.0 (0.0)	0.0 (0.0)	0.0 (0.0)	5.8 (2.3)	34.3 (13.5)	214.0 (84.3)
Source 1: Environment Canada
Source 2: Weatherbase
