= Point Tupper Generating Station =

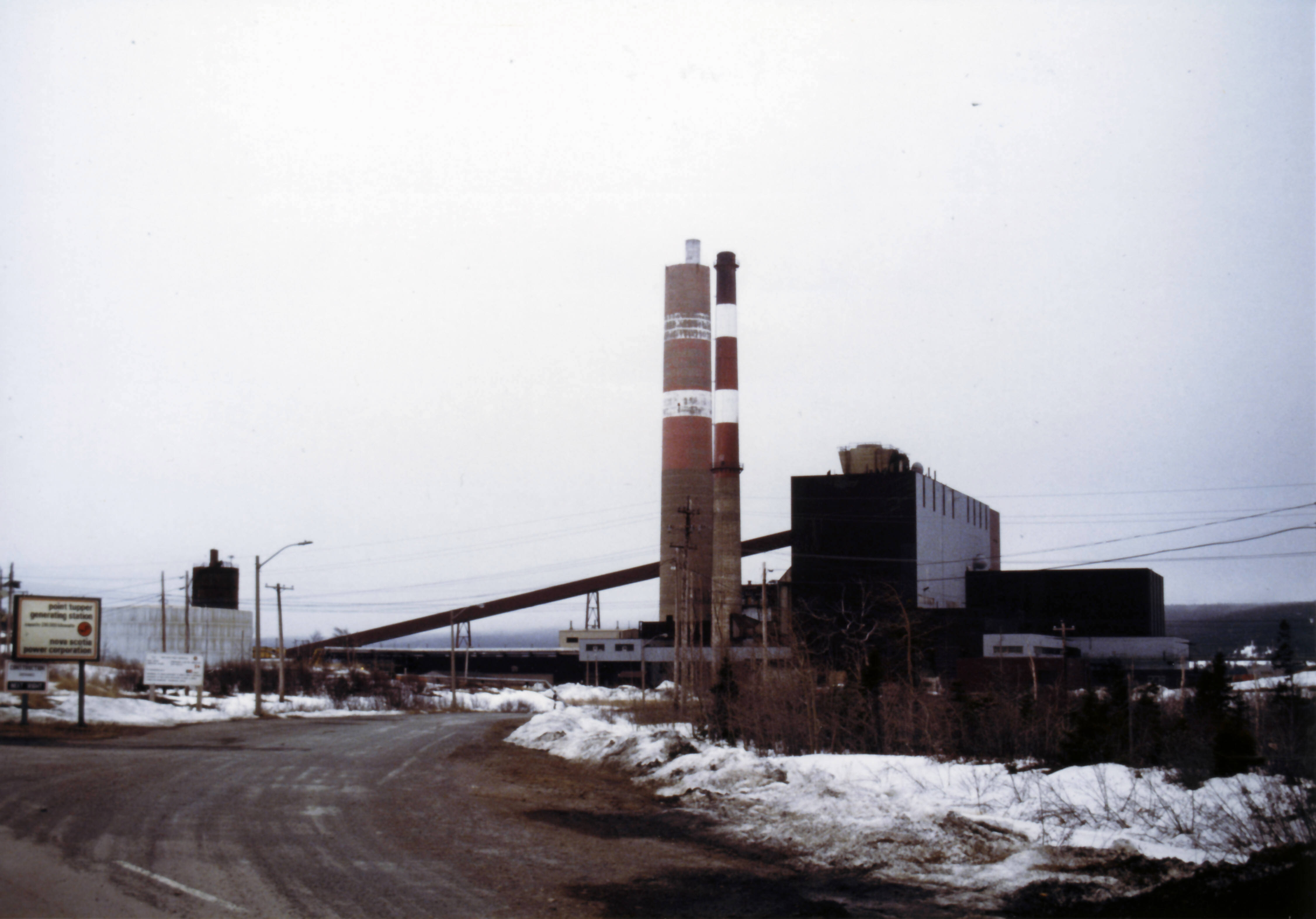
- The Point Tupper Generating Station viewed from the north
- Point Tupper Generating Station, Nova Scotia
- Country: Canada
- Location: Point Tupper, Nova Scotia
- Coordinates: 45.5869°N 61.3481°W
- Status: Operational
- Commission date: 1973
- Owner: Nova Scotia Power

Thermal power station
- Primary fuel: Coal,

Power generation
- Nameplate capacity: 150 MW

External links
- Commons: Related media on Commons

The Point Tupper Generating Station is a 150 MW Canadian electrical generating station located in the community of Point Tupper in Richmond County, Nova Scotia.

A thermal generating station, Point Tupper was opened in 1973 by then-provincial Crown corporation Nova Scotia Power Corporation on Peebles Point on the Strait of Canso immediately south of the community of Point Tupper. It was originally designed to burn oil, later coal.

== Oil and Natural Gas ==
It was designed to burn fuel oil imported through a deep-water supertanker terminal 1 km (0.62 mi) south at Wright Point that served a recently opened oil refinery operated by Gulf Oil.

It is anticipated that the Point Tupper GS will be converted to using natural gas by 2029 and continue to generate electricity until 2049.

== Coal ==
Following the closure of the Gulf Oil refinery (its onshore tanks and deepwater supertanker terminal remain in operation as a storage terminal) in the early 1980s, Nova Scotia Power converted the Point Tupper Generating Station to burn coal beginning in 1987. As part of this conversion, an electrostatic precipitator was installed which is reportedly designed to capture 99% of fly ash emissions.

=== Coal supply ===
Following the 1987 conversion to burn coal, the Point Tupper Generating Station was supplied almost exclusively with coal mined from the Sydney Coal Field by the federal Crown corporation mining company Cape Breton Development Corporation (DEVCO); the coal being delivered to Point Tupper by trains operated first by Canadian National Railway (CN) and after 1993 by the Cape Breton and Central Nova Scotia Railway (CBNS). During the late 1990s, DEVCO began experiencing production shortfalls that led to Nova Scotia Power being forced to import foreign-mined coal from the United States and South America. This coal was delivered to a pier near the Canso Causeway in Aulds Cove adjacent to an aggregate quarry operated by Martin Marietta Materials and loaded onto rail cars for delivery to the Trenton Generating Station as well as to the Point Tupper Generating Station. In fall 2001, DEVCO shut down its remaining mine in the Sydney Coal Field, forcing Nova Scotia Power to import all coal for its remaining power plants in the Sydney region; NSP purchased all the surface assets from DEVCO, including the International Pier coal terminal on Sydney Harbour which was used to supply the Lingan Generating Station and Point Aconi Generating Station, however it continued to import coal for Trenton and Point Tupper through Aulds Cove to lessen the distance coal for these plants had to travel by rail.

In 2005, Nova Scotia Power opened the Point Tupper Marine Coal Terminal adjacent to the Point Tupper Generating Station. This facility is operated for NSP by Savage Canac Corporation under a long-term contract. It has a 134 m (440 ft) long and 13.6 m (45 ft) wide docking pier located 500 m (1,600 ft) offshore in the Strait of Canso. This pier is linked to a concrete storage pad by a conveyor belt capable of moving 3000 tons of coal per hour. The facility handles coal imported for the Point Tupper Generating Station and the Trenton Generating Station; coal for Point Tupper is transferred into the plant by front end loader, whereas coal for Trenton is transferred onto rail cars and moved by trains operated by CBNS.

=== Emissions ===
The plant burns coal and features a single boiler and two chimneys, the taller of which is 107 m (351 ft) high. There are, however, taller structures in the area; the windmills of the Point Tupper Wind Farm, which are approximately 125 m (410 ft) feet high. It consumes 400,000 tonnes of coal per year and currently generates approximately 6% of the province's electricity, while producing roughly 10.7% of the province's air pollution, including hydrochloric acid, sulphuric acid, hexachlorobenzene and mercury. In 2008 the Point Tupper Generating Station created 1.05 million tons of greenhouse gases.

In 2008, Nova Scotia Power installed a 'Low-NOx' combustion firing system in the Point Tupper Generating Station to reduce the plant's nitrogen oxide emissions.

== Biomass ==
In 2011, the owners of the Point Tupper Generating Station took ownership of an adjacent wood-fired turbine, previously owned by NewPage and capable of producing 60 MW of power. At full capacity it can supply 4% of the province's energy demand, while consuming 750,000 tonnes of biomass per year, the equivalent of 50 tractor loads of wood per day. It began production at about 80 percent capacity in July 2013, using wood supplied from Nova Scotia and Quebec woodlots.
