= Point Tupper =

Community in Nova Scotia, Canada

Coordinates: 45°36′16″N 61°22′03″W

Point Tupper (Mi'kmawi'simk: Tui'knek) is a rural community in Richmond County, Nova Scotia, on the Strait of Canso, in western Cape Breton Island.

== History ==
Before settlement, the area was known as Tui'knek, meaning "at the out flow" in Mi'kmawi'simk.

Extensive land grants in the area were acquired in 1863 by Henry Nicholas Paint, of Belle Vue, Canso, member of Parliament for Richmond (Nova Scotia electoral district), who started to promote a township on the site, a project which he continued doggedly until his death in 1921. According to Paint, the site was named by Sir James Kempt after Ferdinand Brock Tupper, the Guernsey historian.

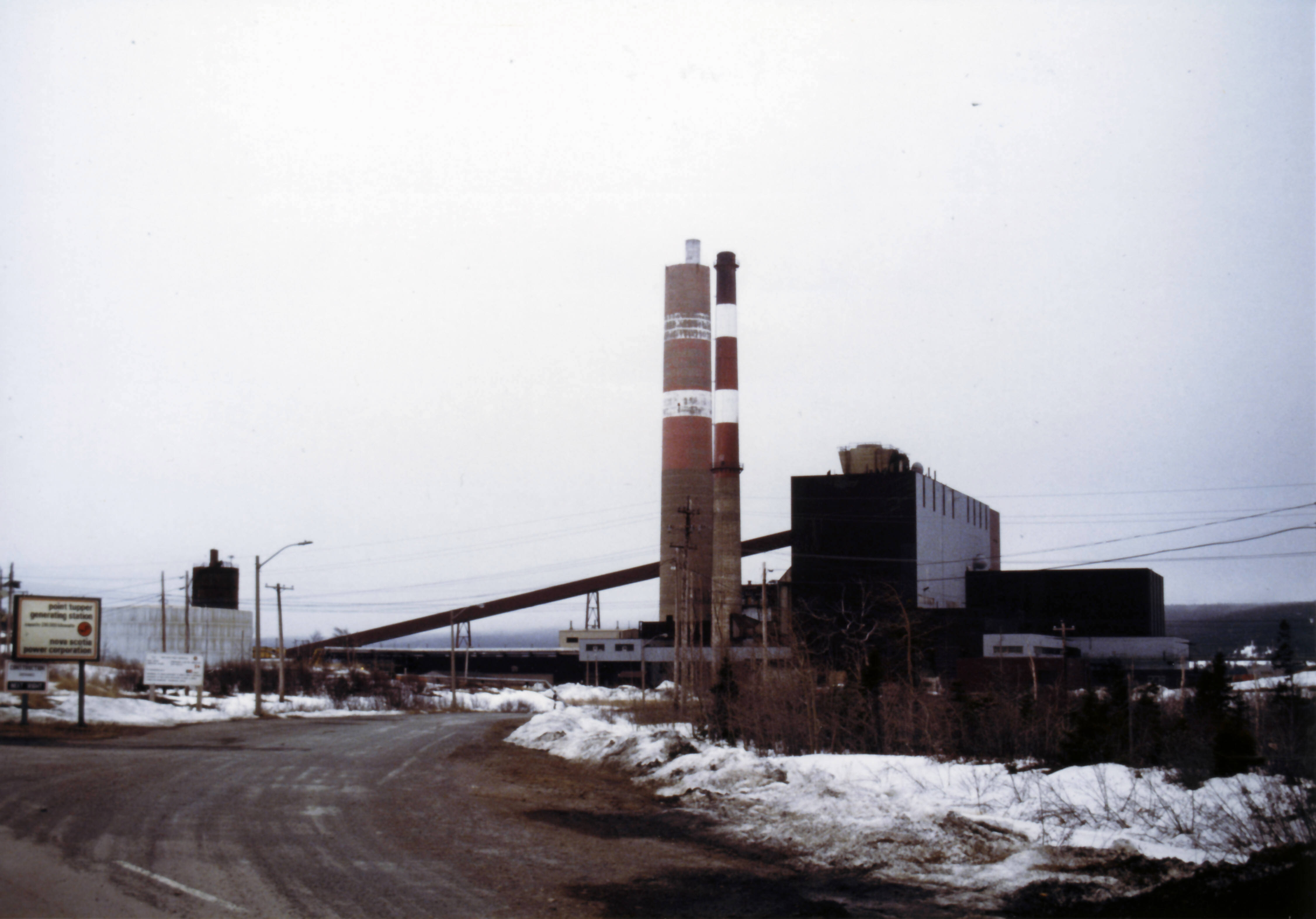
The Point Tupper Generating Station viewed from the north.

== Transportation boom and decline ==
In the 1880s, Point Tupper became the eastern terminal for a railcar ferry service operated from the port of Mulgrave, directly opposite on the western shore of the Strait of Canso. The Intercolonial Railway line continued east from Point Tupper to Sydney, making Point Tupper an extremely important port for the economy of Cape Breton Island.

In 1955, the Canso Causeway opened, closing the railcar ferry service and resulting in a decline in Point Tupper's economy as railway facilities were removed or abandoned.

Point Tupper in Nova Scotia

== Post-causeway industrial growth ==
However the causeway, which completely closed the Strait of Canso's water flow (except for the Canso Canal) also created a sheltered ice-free deepwater port to which Point Tupper's waterfront uniquely suited for the increasing number of modern deep draught cargo ships entering service following World War II.

In the early 1960s, the government of Robert Stanfield created Industrial Estates Limited as a provincial Crown corporation. IEL designated major portions of Crown land fronting the Strait of Canso, including virtually the entire peninsula from Point Tupper to Port Malcolm in Richmond County as well as a corresponding area on the western shore between Mulgrave and Melford in Guysborough County. New highways and roads were constructed and railway lines were extended to service the various properties and lakes were converted to reservoirs.

One of the first industries to locate at Point Tupper was Swedish pulp and paper manufacturer Stora which opened one of the largest pulp mills in eastern North America in the early 1960s. Stora merged in the 1990s with Finnish pulp maker Enso to form Stora Enso. In 2007, Stora Enso sold its North American production facilities including the Point Tupper mill to NewPage Corporation. NewPage closed the mill in September 2011 after it filed for bankruptcy. In 2012 it was sold to Pacific West Commercial Corporation which restarted production in part of the complex.

To service the electrical requirements for the pulp and paper mill, Crown corporation Nova Scotia Power constructed the Point Tupper Generating Station, a new oil-fired power plant at an adjacent property; it was converted to coal in 1986. These industries were soon followed by a gypsum loading terminal for gypsum being mined by Georgia Pacific in the County of Inverness and delivered to Point Tupper by rail - ironically the ship loader was on the same site as the former railcar ferry dock.

Point Tupper was also the site of several failed industrial policies, when the Gulf Oil refinery was closed and mothballed in the late 1970s and later dismantled, although its storage tanks remain to this day, now operated by NuStar Energy. Another more infamous folly involved a heavy water manufacturing plant built in the 1970s following the 1973 oil crisis by Atomic Energy of Canada Limited (AECL), but quickly closed and later mothballed and dismantled. A gypsum drywall manufacturing plant also closed after experiencing difficult economic conditions. A new company, Federal Gypsum, attempted to reactivate the mothballed drywall plant in the early 2000s (with massive government subsidy) but subsequently went bankrupt.

During the late 1990s, Point Tupper's strategic location proved useful when the Sable Island natural gas project located a gas liquids processing plant. In the early 2000s, Nova Scotia Power built a large bulk coal terminal. A liquified natural gas terminal was under construction at the southern end of the Point Tupper Industrial Park at Bear Head but this has since been discontinued.
