= Ecology Action Centre =

Canadian environmental organization

The Ecology Action Centre (EAC) is a non-profit environmental organization founded in 1971 in Halifax, Nova Scotia, credited with launching the province's first recycling program. EAC's 40 employed staff and 300 volunteers work with researchers, policymakers, and the community toward sustainability in seven focus areas: Built Environment, Coastal and Water, Wilderness, Food Action, Marine, Transportation, and Energy.

The EAC has received numerous commendations for its evidence-based programs and policy work, including winning The Coast's award for Best Activist Organization each year from 2004 to 2016, being named one of Tides Canada's Top 10 in both 2003 and 2010, winning an Arthur Kroeger Award for Public Affairs in 2009, and being named one of the Globe and Mail's 10 best-run charities in Canada in 2000.

EAC's Fern Lane headquarters underwent largely volunteer-implemented renovations from 2015 to 2016, incorporating salvaged materials and green building technologies to increase energy efficiency.

== Mission and vision ==
EAC describes their vision as "a society in Nova Scotia that respects and protects nature and provides environmentally and economically sustainable solutions for its citizens". Operating from both ecological and social justice perspectives, the organization advocates for innovative, grassroots approaches to environmental issues.

== History ==
=== Origins ===
The Ecology Action Centre was started in 1971 by a small group of Dalhousie students with help of several government grants. Originally it had two main goals: to promote recycling in Halifax, and to be a source of environmental information for the public. The EAC's first recycling project began in 1972 with a recycling depot that operated every Saturday from Jan. 1972 to Feb. 1975, recycling approximately one ton of paper each week. Today, Nova Scotia has a waste diversion rate higher than any industrialized nation. Early environmental education programs included lectures, a regular newsletter, a library specializing in energy issues, school curricula development, and a high school text on environmental law.

=== Financial crises ===
Despite early success, in March 1974 there was an abrupt end to core funding by the government. In order to provide financial stability, the EAC registered as a society and obtained tax status as a charitable organization. In December 1990, the EAC, along with Greenpeace, the Cape Breton Coalition for Environmental Protection, and the Save Boularderie Island Society filed an unsuccessful lawsuit against the Federal Government of Canada over the proposed Point Aconi Generating Station, which had a significant negative financial impact on the EAC. Thanks to efforts by the fundraising committee, in February 1996 the EAC became officially clear of the debt incurred by the Point Aconi case, but its membership base was lower than at any point in the centre's history.

=== Locations ===
At the time of its inception in May 1971, the EAC was located in a private house on Carleton Street. In November 1971 the EAC moved to the basement of the Forrest Building at Dalhousie University, where it was situated at no cost for 14 years. However, this agreement ended in 1986 and since then the centre has had five homes: the Roy Building on Barrington Street (fall 1986); Veith House in North End Halifax (April 1989); 1553 Granville Street (early 1995); 1568 Argyle Street (June 1996); and 2705 Fern Lane (as of April 2006).

==== Current headquarters ====
The building at 2705 Fern Lane in North End Halifax was purchased by the EAC in July 2005 and renovated by volunteers prior to opening to the public in May 2006. Over the next decade the centre outgrew this space, and further renovations began in May 2015, which were completed in April 2016 after more than 1800 hours of work by volunteers. The current headquarters is largely composed of salvaged materials and features natural plasters on the walls; despite adding nearly 50% more office space, the building's energy efficiency has increased by 22%, setting an impressive precedent for green renovations.
