= New Russell, Nova Scotia =

Community in Nova Scotia, Canada

Coordinates: 44°46′11″N 64°25′24″W

New Russell is a community in the Canadian province of Nova Scotia, located in the Chester Municipal District in Lunenburg County. The South Canoe Wind Energy Project is proposed for this area.
