= Head of St. Margarets Bay, Nova Scotia =

Head of St. Margarets Bay
- Location within Nova Scotia
- Coordinates: 44°40′58″N 63°55′00″W
- Country: Canada
- Province: Nova Scotia
- Municipality: Halifax Regional Municipality
- Community council: Western Region Community Council
- Planning Area: St. Margarets Bay

Population (2021 census)
  - Total: 840

Head of St. Margarets Bay is a rural community on the northeast corner of St. Margarets Bay. The community is in the Halifax Regional Municipality, 40 km west from Halifax via on Trunk 3.

== History ==
The bay was named after Samuel de Champlain's mother Marguerite. His map of 1612 shows the bay as St. Marguerite Baie. The community is the site of the St. Margaret's Bay Hydroelectric System, built in 1922, the oldest hydro plant in Nova Scotia.

== Demographics ==
In the 2021 Census of Population conducted by Statistics Canada, St. Margaret's Bay had a population of 840 living in 364 of its 396 total private dwellings, a change of 7.4% from its 2016 population of 782. With a land area of 2.51 km^{2} (0.97 sq mi), it had a population density of 334.7/km^{2} (866.8/sq mi) in 2021.

== Communications ==
- Telephone exchange 902 – 820 821 826
- First three digits of postal code – B3Z
- Cable Internet access – Eastlink

== Schools ==
- St. Margarets Bay Elementary
