= Dalhousie Mountain =

Mountain in Nova Scotia, Canada

Highest point
- Elevation: 341 m (1,119 ft)
- Coordinates: 45°34′02″N 62°57′47″W

Geography
- Location: Pictou County, Nova Scotia
- Parent range: Cobequid Mountains
- Topo map: NTS 11E10 New Glasgow

Climbing
- Easiest route: drive/hike

Dalhousie Mountain is a Canadian peak in the Cobequid Mountains and the highest elevation point in Pictou County, Nova Scotia.

Located north of Trunk 4 west of Salt Springs, the peak is accessible by vehicle using gated roads and is topped by wind turbines and a forest fire surveillance tower.

== Wind farm ==
The Dalhousie Mountain Wind Farm was constructed in 2009 at a cost of $130 million and consists of 34 wind turbines with an installed capacity of 51 MW. The turbines are clustered in the vicinity of Dalhousie Mountain as well as on the peak itself. The wind farm is owned by RMSenergy Ltd and is operated as Dalhousie Mountain Wind Farm Operating Limited Partnership.

== See also ==
- List of highest points of Canadian provinces and territories
