= Burnside Combustion Turbine =

Power station in Nova Scotia, Canada

- Country: Canada
- Location: Dartmouth, Nova Scotia
- Coordinates: 44°42′54″N 63°36′35″W
- Status: Operational
- Commission date: 1976
- Owner: Nova Scotia Power

Thermal power station
- Primary fuel: Light fuel oil

Power generation
- Nameplate capacity: 132 MW

Burnside Combustion Turbine is a light fuel oil-fired station owned by Nova Scotia Power, located in Dartmouth, Nova Scotia, Canada.

== History ==
The power station, located in the Burnside Industrial Park, was commissioned in 1976 with four 30-MW gas turbines.

== Description ==
The Burnside Combustion Turbine Station consists of 132 MW light oil-fired station that operates as a secondary source.
