= Nova Scotia Utility and Review Board =

The Nova Scotia Utility and Review Board (NSUARB) was an independent tribunal responsible for regulating public utilities and fulfilling a variety of adjudicative functions in Nova Scotia.

On April 1, 2025, the NSUARB's responsibilities were transferred to the newly established Nova Scotia Energy and Regulatory Boards Tribunal, which now handles energy, regulatory, and utility-related matters in the province.

Prior to the transfer, the NSUARB was governed under the Utility and Review Board Act and reported directly to the Nova Scotia House of Assembly through the Minister of Finance.

== History ==
NSUARB was established in 1992 following the amalgamation of the former Public Utilities Board, the Nova Scotia Municipal Board, the Expropriations Compensation Board and the Nova Scotia Tax Review Board.

== Responsibilities ==
The NSUARB had a broad range of mandates. Its responsibilities included:

- apprenticeship and trades appeals
- automobile insurance
- criminal injury compensation appeals
- electricity rates for Nova Scotia Power and other electrical utilities
- expropriation compensation
- film classification appeals
- gaming (casinos)
- gasoline and diesel pricing
- Halifax-Dartmouth Bridge Commission
- Halifax Water sewer and stormwater rates
- liquor licensing
- motor carrier - public passenger licensing
- municipal electoral district boundaries
- municipal planning appeals
- natural gas
- payday loans
- property assessment appeals
- railways
- municipal water utilities

== See also ==
- Prince Edward Island Regulatory and Appeals Commission
