= Cobequid Mountains =

Canadian mountain range

Coordinates: 45°31′N 64°05′W

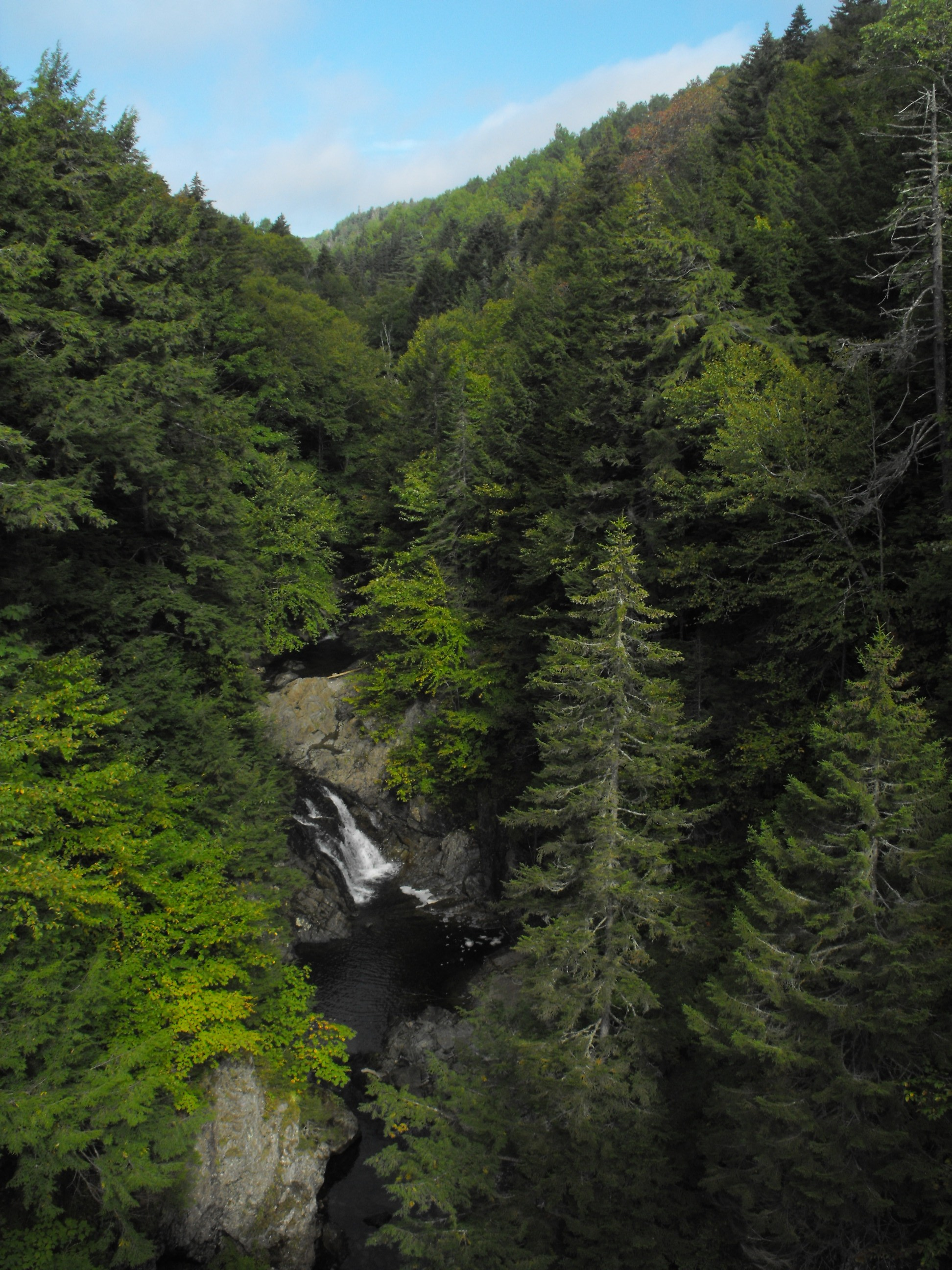
Waterfall on the Great Village River, one of many deeply cut rivers flowing out of the Cobequid Mountains of Nova Scotia.

The Cobequid Mountains, also sometimes referred to as the Cobequid Hills, is a Canadian mountain range located in Nova Scotia in the mainland portion of the province.

== Geologic history ==
Geologically, the Cobequid Mountains are considered part of the Appalachians. The range stretches from Cape Chignecto in Cumberland County in the west through to Pictou County in the east.

The Cobequid Mountains trace their geologic history to the Precambrian and Devonian ages. Consequently, the mountains are composed of a combination of sediments, granites and volcanic rocks, all of which has been crushed and folded by continental drift when this part of Nova Scotia was located at the centre of the Pangea supercontinent. Subsequent erosion over millions of years has resulted in the present-day low range of mountains and rolling hills.

The part of northern Nova Scotia which contains the Cobequid Mountains is believed to have been linked with what is now northern Europe. Its collision with a section from present-day northern Africa has resulted in the current landscape in the province; a remnant fault line from this event, the Cobequid-Chedabucto Fault, extends along the southern portion of the Cobequid Mountains, immediately north of the Minas Basin and Cobequid Bay east to Canso.

Some mistakenly consider the Cobequid Mountains to extend into Antigonish County further east, however this smaller range is geologically distinct and is named the Pictou-Antigonish Highlands.

== Highest elevations ==
The highest point of the Cobequid Mountains is an unnamed peak on the eastern side of the Wentworth Valley (365 m (1,198 ft)). Other high peaks include Higgins Mountain (364 m (1,194 ft)), Nuttby Mountain (360 m (1,181 ft)), Dalhousie Mountain (335 m (1,099 ft)), and Mt. Thom (329 m (1,079 ft)).

== Freshwater resources ==
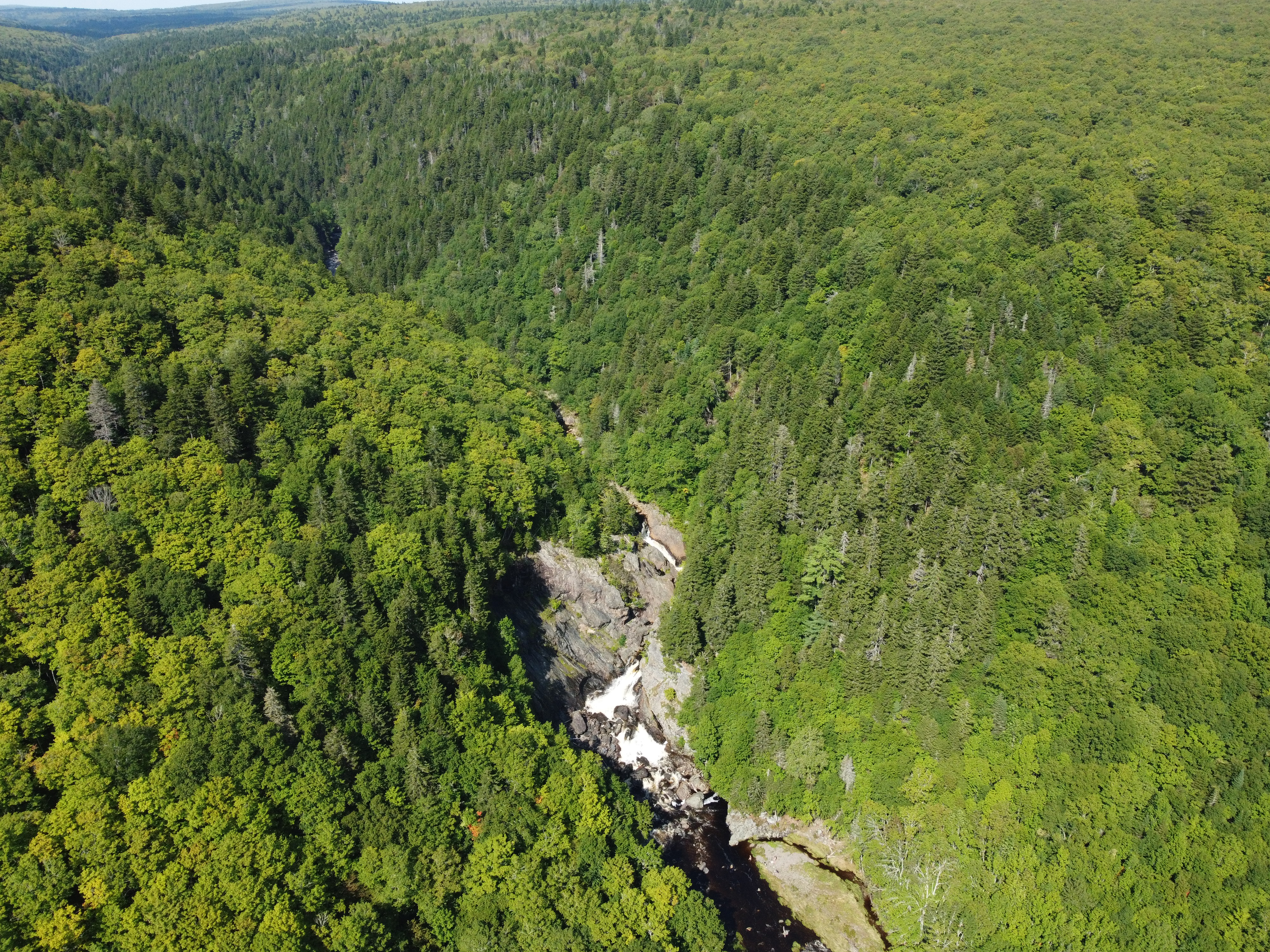
The waterfall around 7 km north of Economy, showing the typical terrain of the Cobequid Mountains: a relatively level plateau with a mix of hard and softwoods, interspersed with multiple rivers running through deep, V-shaped valleys.

The range contains an abundance of freshwater lakes and some springs which form headwaters that flow via a number of small rivers and streams south into the Minas Basin and north into Northumberland Strait. Several escarpments associated with the Fundy Basin have been formed from fault lines, resulting in a number of waterfalls on the southern mountain slopes.

== Forests and mineral resources ==
Forests covering the Cobequid Mountains are mainly of hardwood species sugar maple and yellow birch on mountain slopes, which present spectacular displays in autumn with the changing of the colours. Steep stream and river valleys are dominated by red spruce stands. The lower slopes consist of balsam fir, red spruce, black spruce, white spruce, paper birch, and red maple.

The sedimentary deposits in the Cobequid Mountains hold several coal deposits in various basins, stretching across the northern slope of the mountains in Cumberland County (from Joggins through River Hebert to Springhill) and on the southern edge at Debert. Igneous rocks yielded iron ore at Londonderry.
