= St. Margaret's Bay Hydroelectric System =

Hydroelectric Generating System in Nova Scotia, Canada

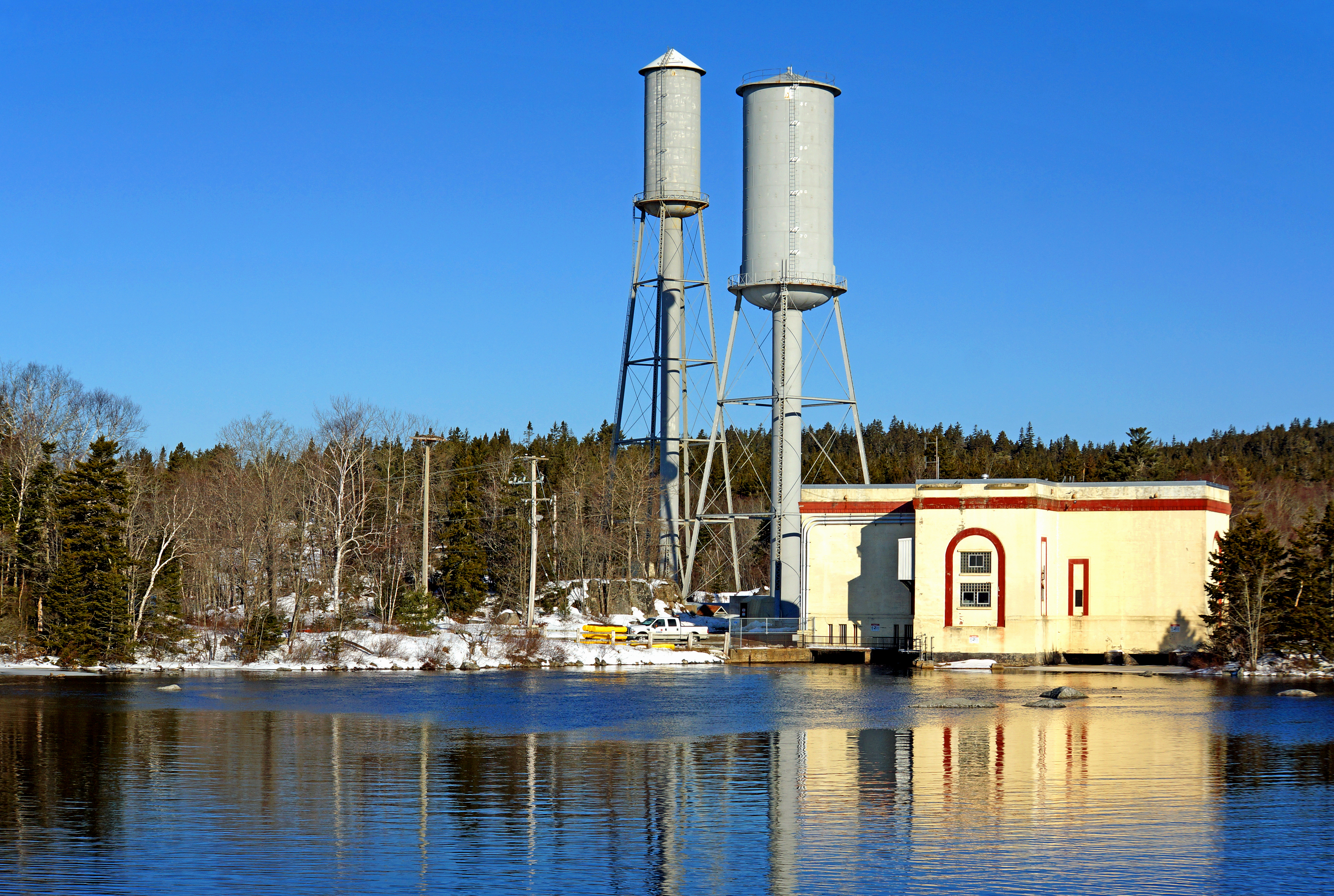
- Mill Lake Hydro Plant

- Location of second of two power stations St. Margaret's Bay Hydroelectric System (Canada)
- Country: Canada
- Location: Halifax Regional Municipality, Nova Scotia
- Coordinates: 44.69145°N 63.8917°W
- Purpose: Power
- Status: Operational
- Construction began: May 1920
- Construction cost: $1,700,000
- Built by: D.G. Loomis & Sons
- Designed by: C.H. & P.H. Mitchell, of Toronto
- Owner: Emera
- Operator: Nova Scotia Power

Upper reservoir
- Creates: Mill Lake & Sandy Lake
- Total capacity: 101,145,000 m^{3} (82,000 acre⋅ft)
- Active capacity: 89,180,700 m^{3} (72,300 acre⋅ft)
- Catchment area: 271 square kilometres (105 sq mi)
- Normal elevation: Mill Lake 77.4 m (253.9 ft), Sandy Lake 66 m (216.5 ft)

Lower reservoir
- Creates: Mill Lake Head Pond
- Normal elevation: 27.9 m (91.5 ft)

Mill Lake, Sandy Lake & Tidewater Plants
- Coordinates: 44.691384°N 63.891380°E
- Commission date: 8 June 1922
- Type: Conventional
- Hydraulic head: Mill Lake 50 m (164.04 ft), Sandy Lake 38 m (124.67 ft), Tidewater 27.9 m (91.54 ft)
- Turbines: 2 x 6 MW + 2 x 2.9 MW
- Installed capacity: 10.2 MW
- Annual generation: 30 GWh
- Website www.nspower.ca

The St. Margaret's Bay Hydroelectric System consists of three hydroelectric power plants (two collocated in the same building) and the related lake, dam, and river systems driving them. The system is situated within both Lunenburg County and the Halifax Regional Municipality, beginning approximately 2.5 km (1.6 mi) east of the Head of Saint Margarets Bay and approximately 10 km (6.2 mi) southwest of Hammonds Plains. The system is part of the East Indian River watershed and drains 271 square kilometres (105 sq mi), with water storage provided in Lunenburg County by Mill Lake, Coon Pond, Sandy Lake, Wrights Lake, Big Indian Lake, Five Mile Lake and, at times, an overflow from Pockwock Lake in the Halifax Regional Municipality. The system is owned and operated by Nova Scotia Power Inc.

System assets associated with the St. Margaret's Bay Hydro System, which represents six generating units with an operating capacity of 10.2 MW, include Beeswanger Dam, Five Mile Dam and Wing Dam 4, Mack Lake Main Dam, Five Mile Wing Dams 1,2 and 3, Big Indian Dam, Wright's Lake Dam, Coon Pond Dam, Sandy Lake Dam, Sandy Lake and Coon Pond Pipeline, Mill Lake Plant and Surge Tank, Little Indian Crossover, Mill Lake Dam, Tidewater Plant and Surge Tank, Tidewater Pipeline, as well as associated headponds. Outflow is into St. Margarets Bay, Nova Scotia between Head of St. Margarets Bay and Tantallon.

Commissioned 8 June 1922, St. Margaret's Bay Hydroelectric System is the oldest hydro plant in Nova Scotia.

== Technical characteristics ==
=== Dams, Wing Dams, Spillways, and Canals ===
There are 19 dams and wing dams of various heights, lengths and construction types holding back the lakes and reservoirs that make up the St. Margaret's Bay Hydroelectric System:

Dam or other Structure	Height (ft.)	Length (ft.)	Foundation	Type
Coon Pond Dam and Spillway	32	408	Constructed on bedrock	Concrete & Earthfill
Sandy Lake Dam and Spillway	50.5	1,021	Constructed on bedrock	Concrete & Earthfill
Big Indian Spillway	25.1	430	Constructed on bedrock	Concrete
Big Indian Main Dam (Concrete)	37.9	470	Constructed on bedrock	Concrete
Big Indian Main Dam (Earthfill)	33.3	120	Constructed on bedrock	Concrete & Earthfill
Big Indian Wing Dam No. 1	4	75		
Big Indian Wing Dam No. 2	2.5	85		
Five Mile Lake Main Dam	14.5	695	Constructed on bedrock	Concrete
Mack Lake Dam	20	410		Earthfill
Five Mile Lake Wing Dam No. 1	6	200	Freeboard dam	Earthfill
Five Mile Lake Wing Dam No. 2	4	165	Freeboard dam	Earthfill
Five Mile Lake Wing Dam No. 3	4	105	Freeboard dam	Earthfill
Five Mile Lake Wing Dam No. 4	10	500	Freeboard dam	Concrete
Beeswanger Dam	8	460	Freeboard dam	Earthfill
Wrights Lake Dam and spillway	17	326		Concrete & Earthfill
Wrights Lake Wing Dam No. 1	4	20		
Wrights Lake Wing Dam No. 2	3.5	20		
Wrights Lake Wing Dam No. 3	5	35		
Little Indian Lake Cross-over Control Structure	4	170	Constructed on bedrock	Concrete & Earthfill
Mill Lake Head Pond Dam (Tidewater Plant)	20	830	Constructed on bedrock	Concrete & Earthfill

Water for the system comes from Five Mile Lake, Big Indian Lake, Sandy Lake, Wrights Lake, Coon Pond, Mill Lake and, at times, overflow from Pockwock Lake. The two principal storage areas for the Sandy Lake Development are Five Mile Lake and Big Indian Lake.

On the Eastern side of the system, drainage into Wright's Lake and Coon Pond, in addition to surplus water from Pockwock Lake (owned by Halifax Regional Municipality), supplies the Mill Lake Plant. The new Coon Pond Dam has water continually flowing out from a maintenance chute to ensure water is always feeding a stream leading to St. Margaret's Bay to maintain fish habitat in the stream.

Output water from the Sandy Lake and Mill Lake plants then flow into the Mill Lake Head Pond to supply the Tidewater Plant which outputs at sea level into St. Margaret's Bay.

The total elevation from the highest reservoir to sea level is 134.2 m (440 ft). The St. Margaret's Bay Hydroelectric System has an annual output of 30 Gigawatt hours of electricity from two .6 MW generators at Mill Lake and two 2.9 MW generators at the Tidewater plant.

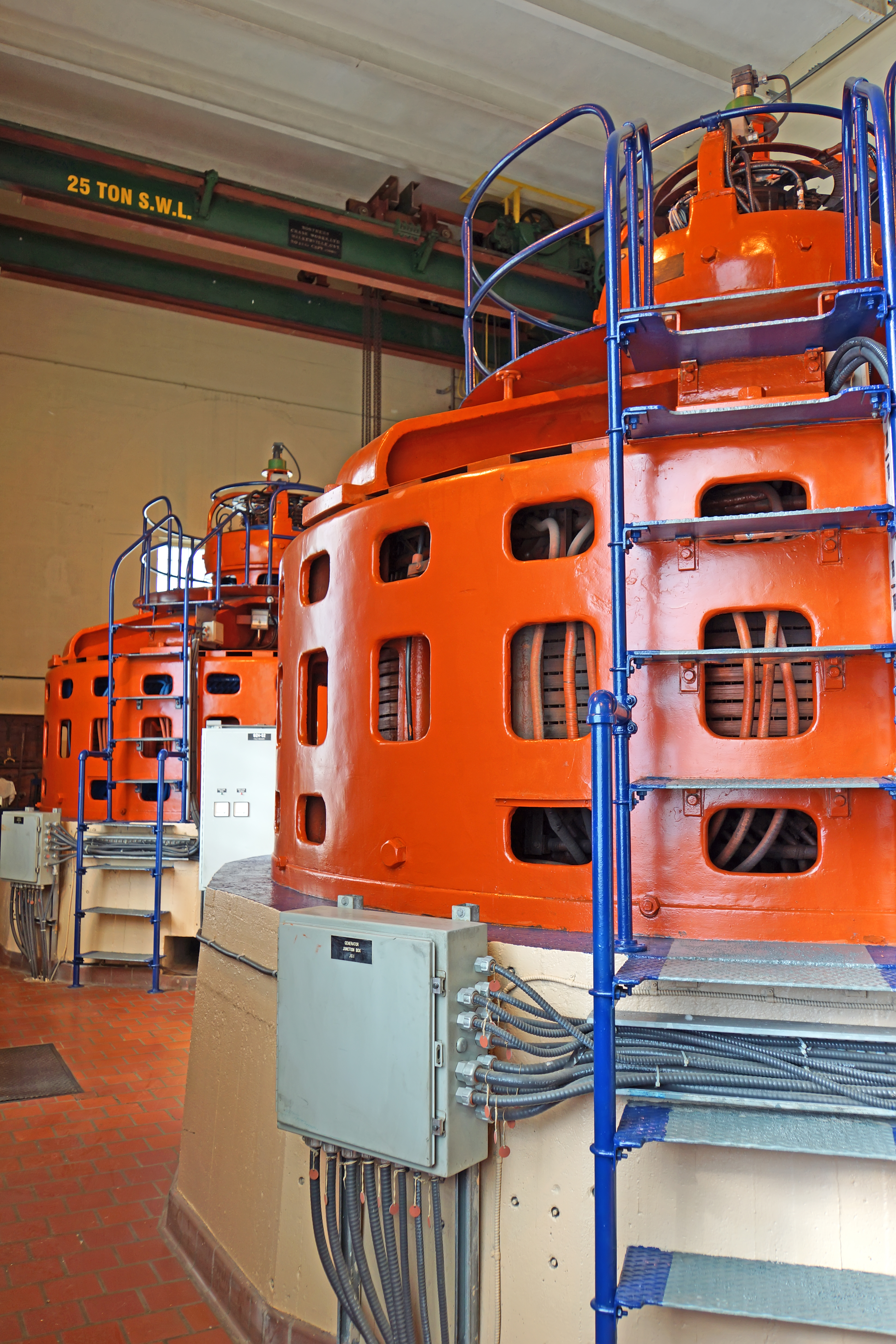
The Generators were made by General Electric Co limited from Peterborough, Toronto, Ontario, Canada.

=== Mill Lake Generating Station ===
Located on the Northeast River. Two vertical francis turbine units, shaft direct connected to the generators, with individual direct connected exciters, 49.5 m (162.4 ft) static head, 514 rpm, 1.42 MW (1,904 hp), for a total of 3.73 MW (5,000 hp). Two generators, 1,600 kVA each, 13,200 volts, 3 phase, 60 Hz. The original penstocks were built out of wood, using tongue & groove staves held together with metal bands (the same technology used in wood barrels), 1.82 m (6 ft) diameter, 965.6 m (3,168 ft) long, later replaced in part with fibreglass penstocks. More recently (2010) the penstocks from Coon Pond to the Mill Lake Station were replaced with black polypropylene, buried underground.

=== Sandy Lake Generating Station ===
Sandy Lake Generating Station was added to the system in 1927. The power house was built beside the Mill Lake Plant. Two vertical francis turbine units, shaft direct connected to the generators, with motor generator set excitation, 38.1 m (125.0 ft) static head, 514 rpm, 1.86 MW (2,494 hp), for a total of 2.84 MW (3,810 hp). Two generators, 2,000 kVA each, 13,200 volts, 3 phase, 60 Hz. The original Penstocks were built out of wood tongue & groove staves with metal bands, 2.43 m (8 ft) diameter, 1,756.5 m (5,763 ft) long, later replaced in part with fibreglass penstocks.

=== Tidewater Generating Station ===
Located on the shores of St. Margaret's Bay. Two vertical francis turbine units, shaft direct connected to the generators, with individual direct connected exciters, 27.9 m (91.5 ft) static head, 300 rpm, 2.57 MW (3,446 hp), for a total of 5.14 MW (6,890 hp). Two generators, 3,900 kVA each, 13,200 volts, 3 phase, 60 Hz. The original Penstocks were built out of wood tongue & groove staves with metal bands, 3 m (10 ft) diameter, 909.2 m (2,983 ft) long, later replaced in part with fibreglass penstocks.

== 2012 Upgrade ==
The system was upgraded in 2012 with $17.8 million of work to replace the old wooden penstocks in fibreglass, a new water surge tank, a new dam at Mill Lake, a new gatehouse and gate at Mill Lake, and new floating booms to keep debris away from the dams.

== 2016 Surge Tank replacement ==
The original 43.9 m (144 ft) tall Sandy Lake Surge Tank was installed in 1927, and refurbished in 1996. In 2016 it was replaced with a new Surge Tank made of steel and fiberglass.

== Restoration of Fish Habitat ==
Gaspereau have returned to Indian River on the St. Margaret's Bay Hydro System for the first time in well over 100 years.

On 16 May 16, 1881, an inspector with the then federal Department of Marine and Fisheries toured the St. Margaret's Bay watershed and noted the lack of fish because dams used for running and milling logs did not have fish ladders.

In 2015 Nova Scotia Power invested $4 million into building the largest fish ladder in Nova Scotia at the Sandy Lake Dam.

On 17 May 2016 – 135 years and one day after the federal inspector had been there - a field biologist with Nova Scotia Power checked the ladder and spotted three gaspereau in the resting pools.

“It’s awesome, it’s absolutely awesome,” said Darcy Pettipas, the senior environmental technologist who for two weeks had been checking the ladder for signs of the fish. He'd seen speckled trout and smallmouth bass, but no gaspereau.

Pettipas was working on another project the day the biologist saw the three gaspereau. He headed out to the fish ladder the next day and dipped his underwater live view camera into the fishway. It turns out there were so many gaspereau he didn't need the camera.

“We saw many gaspereau throughout the ladder as well as speckled trout, smallmouth bass and a white sucker,” Pettipas said.

“We weren’t sure if the gaspereau would come back or not,” said senior environmental scientist Jay Walmsley. That's because it had been generations since gaspereau last spawned in this river system.

The intent of the ladder is to ensure the passage of species of fish that have to migrate to fulfill their life cycles, such as gaspereau and the endangered Southern Upland Atlantic salmon. Gaspereau swim up the river in the spring to spawn in the still waters of the lake then swim back to sea in the fall.

“Gaspereau tend to go back to spawn in the same river that they’re used to. They imprint on the steam on their way out, and when they come back to spawn, most go up the river they were born in,” Walmsley said.

But it seems the new fish ladder, through both its design and the 30 cubic feet per second of water that flows through it, created enough white, bubbly water in the river to attract some of the fish to the ladder.

From the ladder, the fish will make their way to Sandy Lake.

“Gaspereau are important because they bring nutrients from the ocean and the more different types of fish we have in the system, the greater the diversity and productivity, and the healthier the system,” Walmsley said. “They are very beneficial to the ecosystem.”

Walmsley said this success holds tremendous potential. It's hoped the fish will eventually extend to the whole catchment area of the Indian River.
