= South Canoe Wind Energy Project =

- Location of South Canoe in Nova Scotia
- Country: Canada
- Location: Lunenburg County
- Coordinates: 44.7728°N 64.3243°W
- Status: Operational

Wind farm
- Type: Onshore

Power generation
- Nameplate capacity: 102 MW

The South Canoe Wind Energy Project is a wind farm in Lunenburg County, Nova Scotia, between Vaughan and New Russell, including 34 wind turbines providing 102 megawatts of electricity. The project opened 21 June 2015.

The project is being developed by Minas Basin Pulp and Power, Oxford Frozen Foods Ltd., and Nova Scotia Power. The project was built entirely within land owned by Minas Basin.

The Municipality of the District of Chester approved the project March 14, 2013.

However a local citizens group, the Friends of South Canoe Lake, has launched an appeal of this decision citing the decision did not reasonably conform to Chester's Municipal Planning Strategy (MPS). As of May 30, deliberations are underway at the Nova Scotia Utility and Review Board (UARB) under case number M05602.
