= Point Aconi Generating Station =

Thermal Generating System in eastern Nova Scotia, Canada

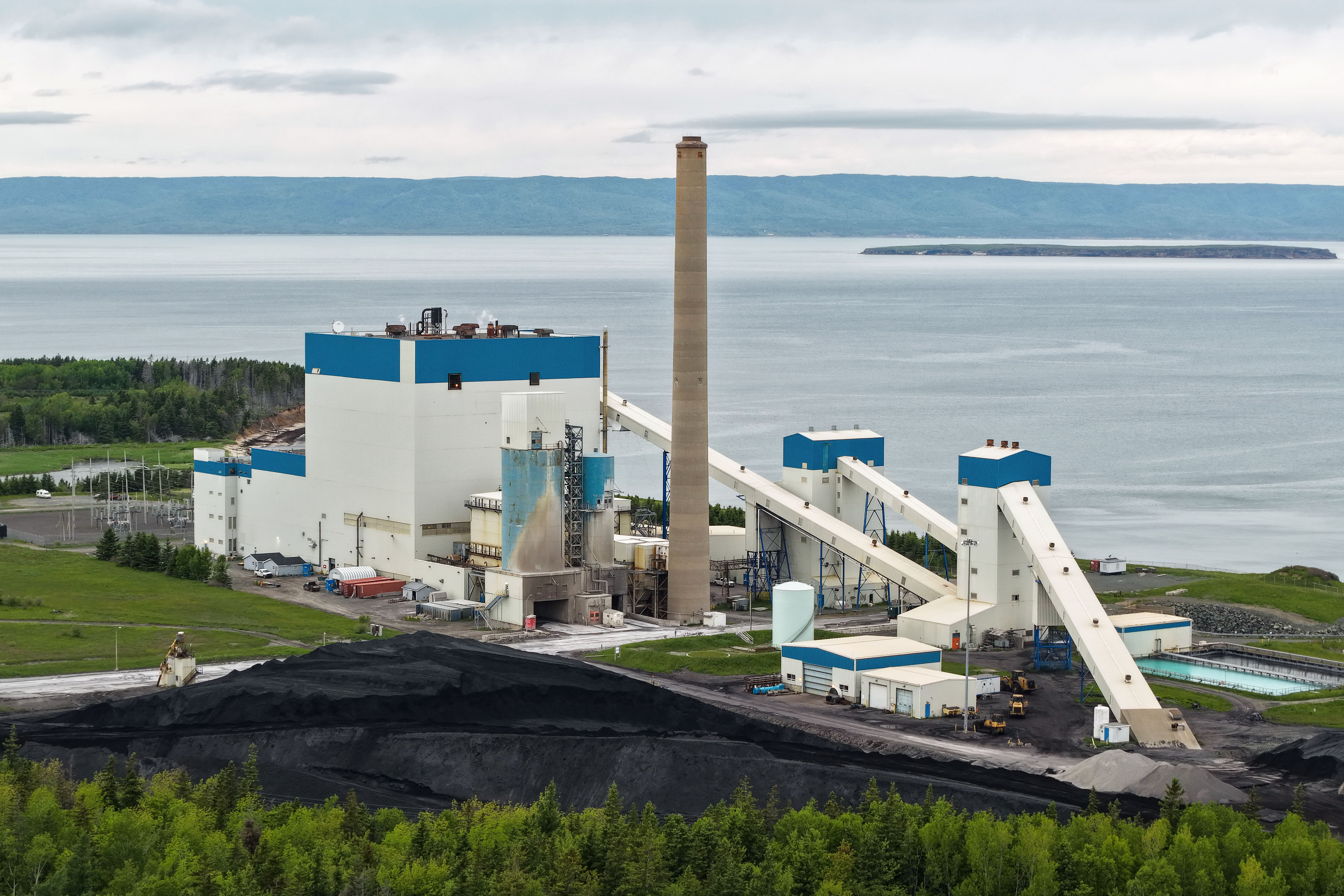
- Point Aconi Generating Station
- Country: Canada
- Location: Point Aconi, Nova Scotia
- Coordinates: 46.321633°N 60.329987°W
- Status: Operational
- Construction began: January 1990
- Commission date: 13 August 1994
- Owner: Nova Scotia Power
- Employees: 65

Thermal power station
- Primary fuel: Coal
- Secondary fuel: Petroleum coke
- Turbine technology: Steam turbine
- Chimneys: 1
- Cooling source: Water from the Cabot Strait

Power generation
- Units operational: 1
- Nameplate capacity: 185 MW

External links
- Website: https://www.nspower.ca
- Commons: Related media on Commons

The Point Aconi Generating Station is a 165 MW Canadian electrical generating station located in the community of Point Aconi, Nova Scotia, a rural community in the Cape Breton Regional Municipality. A thermal generating station, the Point Aconi Generating Station is owned and operated by Nova Scotia Power Corporation. It opened on August 13, 1994, following four years of construction.

The Point Aconi Generating Station is situated on the shores of the Cabot Strait at the northeastern tip of Boularderie Island, located approximately 2 km (1.2 mi) west of the headland named Point Aconi and 2 km (1.2 mi) east of the headland named Table Head. Its civic address is 1800 Prince Mine Rd, Point Aconi, NS. The facility is located at the northern terminus of Prince Mine Rd – Highway 162.

Unlike the nearby Lingan Generating Station which has four generating units, Point Aconi has only one. The Point Aconi unit, however, is the largest producing unit in Nova Scotia and is also the province's newest. The facility is able to produce 165 MW and, unlike the vast majority of Canadian coal-fired power plants, uses circulating fluidized bed (CFB) to reduce emissions of NO_{x} and SO_{2}.

Point Aconi was the world's largest CFB plant—and the first to enter commercial service in North America—when it came on-line in 1993. Tokyo-based Mitsui & Co., Ltd. was the turnkey contractor for Point Aconi; Sargent & Lundy was the project's architect/engineer.

== Development ==
The Seaboard Generating Station opened in Glace Bay in 1931 by Dominion Steel and Coal Corporation and was the sole supplier of electricity for the Industrial Cape Breton region until its purchase by Nova Scotia Power in 1966 as part of DOSCO's ongoing asset liquidation. Nova Scotia Power opened the province's largest generating station, the Lingan Generating Station, at the height of the 1979 energy crisis to take advantage of relatively cheap Cape Breton coal being produced by the Cape Breton Development Corporation (DEVCO).

The idea of replacing the aging Seaboard Generating Station was discussed during the 1980s and was an important promise by the incumbent Progressive Conservative Party led by Premier John Buchanan during the 1988 provincial election. After Buchanan's government was returned to power, Nova Scotia Power issued a call for proposals in October 1988 to construct a 150 megawatt CFB (Circulating Fluidized Bed) coal-fired electrical generating station in Point Aconi.

Significant controversy dogged Buchanan's election promise to build a new generating station as the Public Utility Board had authority to decide on all applications by Nova Scotia Power to construct new generating stations as well as associated rate increases. The PUB began to conduct hearings into the project in spring 1989 and stated that an economic analysis of Buchanan's election promise (the $500 million Point Aconi Generating Station) was not required as the province's generating needs were met by current sources. Coincidentally, Nova Scotia Power had also promised to purchase electricity from small independent power producers in the province beginning in 1990, however this agreement was abolished after the Small Private Power Association of Nova Scotia intervened at the PUB hearings to block the proposed Point Aconi Generating Station. On April 27, 1989, Buchanan introduced a controversial amendment to the Public Utilities Act, which would remove the requirement for Nova Scotia Power to submit proposals for new generating station to the PUB. Hearings into the Point Aconi project were cancelled after the amendment to the Public Utilities Act receiving royal assent in early June 1989.

=== Request for proposals ===
In early January 1990, Nova Scotia Power announced that the Japanese industrial conglomerate Mitsui had won the Request for Proposals (RFP) that had been issued in fall 1988 and a contract was signed on behalf of the Government of Nova Scotia. The proposal detailed a turnkey project designed by Mitsui with the CFB steam boiler supplied by Pyro-Power through Kamtech Services (a subsidiary of Lauren Engineers & Constructors of Abilene, Texas), project management and engineering by Chicago-based Sargent & Lundy LLC, and construction of the plant itself by Jones Power Corporation.

=== Public hearings ===
Two weeks later, the provincial government announced that its Environmental Control Council would conduct a one-day hearing into the project on January 18, 1990, in place of the PUB hearings conducted the previous spring which were aborted as a result of the amendment to the Public Utilities Act. The hearing received submissions from citizens and organizations that were strongly opposed to the Point Aconi Generating Station, pointing out the environmental impact, that its generating capacity wasn't required, and that it was a political mega-project that would add to the financial debt of the publicly owned Nova Scotia Power Corporation.

Other submissions from citizens and organizations were supportive of the project, which they claimed would create an estimated 500 construction and operating jobs, as well as theoretically guarantee work in Cape Breton's coal mines; the United Mine Workers of America Local 26 had lobbied hard for the power plant. Richie Mann, the environment critic for the official opposition Liberal Party asked at the one-day hearing, "Can you give us some evidence that this process is not an exercise in public relations, a sham?"

On Friday, March 9, 1990, the provincial government announced its approval of the estimated $436 million project, even though it had already signed a contract with Mitsui two months earlier. Nova Scotia's Environment Minister John Leefe defended the projected 1.5 million tonnes per year of carbon dioxide emissions, stating "[The project will be] absolutely inconsequential in terms of global carbon dioxide production."

Nova Scotia Power pointed out the environmental benefits of the Point Aconi project, stating that the use of CFB technology whereby limestone would be used to filter out sulphur dioxide (SO_{2}) and nitrogen oxide (NO_{x}) which were major contributors to acid rain. Minister Leefe stated that Nova Scotia Power intended to reduce SO_{2} emissions from its generating stations to 100,000 tonnes a year by 2010 from the 1990 level of 160,000 tonnes. Minister Leefe also noted that while the use of CFB technology would reduce acid rain, it would also result in a comparatively massive increase in carbon dioxide (CO_{2}) emissions which was a greenhouse gas; Leefe told reporters that Nova Scotia's coal-fired plants contributed 32 per cent of the 18 million tonnes per year of CO_{2} emitted by the province (as of 1990).

The projected increase in Nova Scotia's CO_{2} emissions as a result of the Point Aconi Generating Station (an estimated additional 1.5 million tonnes per year) went against a recent (1990) decision by federal and provincial energy ministers to reduce emissions of the gas by at least 20 per cent by 2005.

The debate over construction of the Point Aconi Generating Station took place in the shadow of a much larger global debate over acid rain and its contributing factors, such as fossil fueled generating stations. The acid rain controversy resulted in the Canada-United States Air Quality Agreement which was signed by both countries on March 13, 1991, and stipulated that both countries would agree to reduce emissions of sulphur dioxide (SO_{2}) and nitrogen oxide (NO_{x}).

=== Full federal environmental review rejected ===
On September 20, 1990, federal Minister of Fisheries and Oceans Bernard Valcourt rejected a full environmental review of the project, arguing that any problems to the environment would be relatively minor. Valcourt justified this decision by referring to a scientific report on the project conducted by the Department of Fisheries and Oceans which stated that use of CFB technology could be mitigated. It noted, however, the widespread concern of local residents over the effect of the generating station's draw on ground water supplies (CFB requires large amounts of fresh water) as well as ash discharge and CO_{2} emissions. The DFO scientists noted widespread mistrust of the provincial government's decision and that the controversial one-day hearing in January left the impression "of a cooked-up deal between the province and federal government to slip this project by without a fair assessment of its potential dangers. In fact, problems are relatively minor... Point Aconi is in some respects a model."

On December 13, 1990, lawyers for Greenpeace, the Ecology Action Centre and six property owners who live near Point Aconi argued in the Federal Court of Canada that Valcourt had made a legal error in rejecting a public environmental review panel and that federal Environmental Assessment Review Panel guidelines should be followed to institute a formal review of the $436 million project. Mr. Justice Andrew MacKay ruled against the application on Friday, January 18, 1991, by stating that the Department of Fisheries and Oceans acted in accordance with the law in deciding not to order a full environmental assessment of the project. MacKay noted that the project has resulted in substantial testing of ground water around the plant. He also noted that because there are no standards for CO_{2}, it was impossible to say that the plant would create a pollution problem with its massive CO_{2} emissions.

A citizens liaison committee was established by Nova Scotia Power to review the project. Current (2010) Member of Parliament for Sydney—Victoria, Mark Eyking whose family operated several farms on Boularderie Island near Point Aconi was a member of this committee at that time and had questions about how emissions from the plant or ground water withdrawn for it would affect his crops or how losses would be compensated, stating, "We see all these little mistakes happening and we know we're going to get dumped on. But when we ask for a neutral party to look at this, Nova Scotia power brings in its big shooters and they knock us down like pegs. Now it's almost too late but people won't sit down and take this any more."

In addition to the estimated $436 million cost for the generating station, the project also included construction of a $150 million transmission line running for 435 km (270 mi) from Point Aconi to Halifax. Several property owners along the proposed route rejected offers by Nova Scotia Power to purchase their land, citing the physiological effects of the electromagnetic field from transmission lines. Additional controversy occurred when it was determined that the proposed route would disturb a great blue heron colony, which brought angry responses from members of the Mi'kmaq Nation.

Mitsui formed Mitsui & Co. (Point Aconi) Ltd. as an extraprovincial corporation in another province on December 1, 1989, as a result of its RFP submission. Mitsui & Co. (Point Aconi) Ltd. was registered in Nova Scotia on February 12, 1990, after the contract was signed with Nova Scotia Power in early January.

== Construction ==
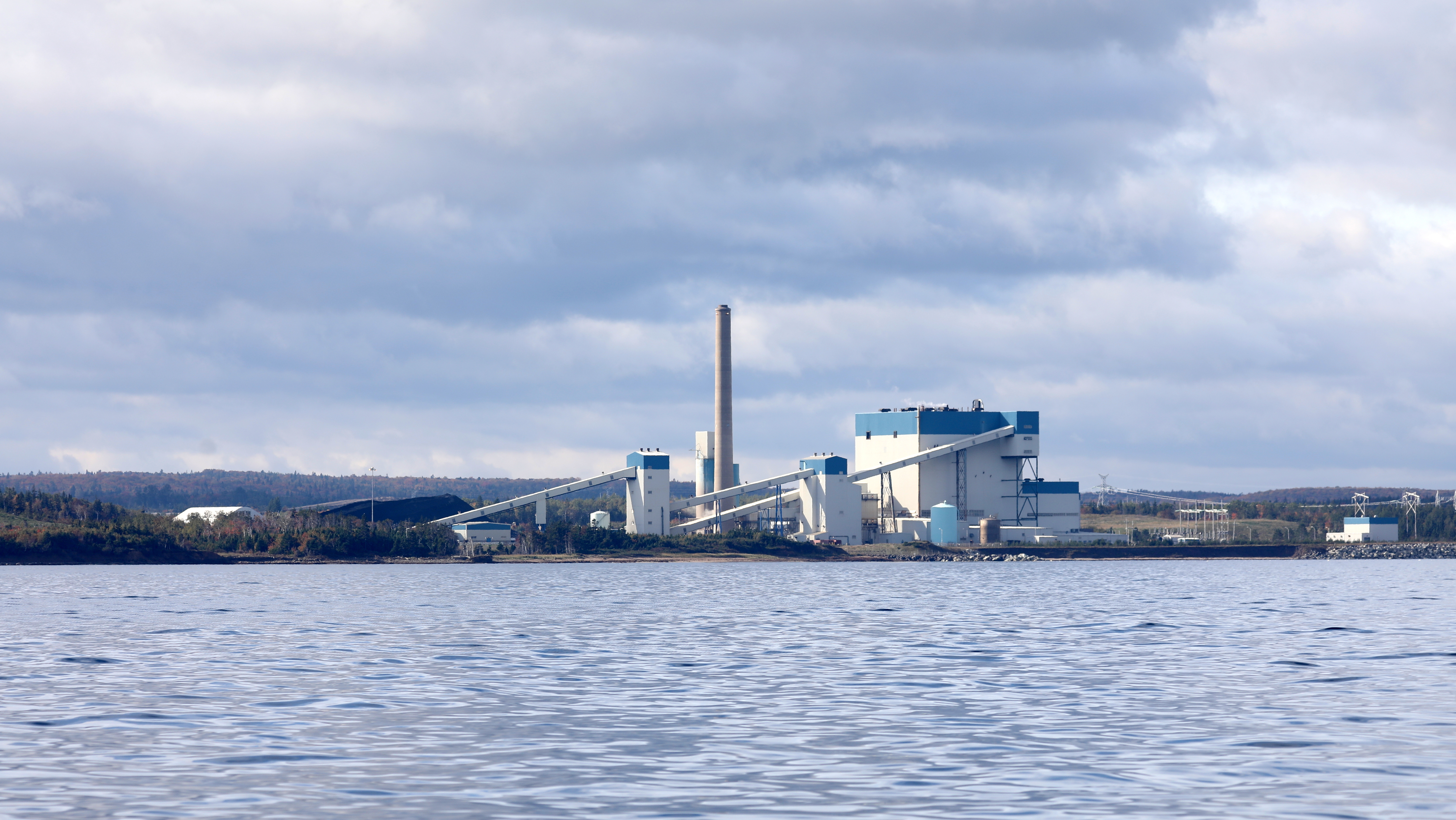
Point Aconi Generating Station seen from the waters of the Cabot Strait

Construction of the Point Aconi Generating Station began in early 1990 after Mitsui & Co. (Point Aconi) Ltd. contracted with Jones Power Corporation to act as construction manager and carry out construction work for the Point Aconi Generating Station project. Jones Power Corporation's obligations were guaranteed by its subsidiary J.A. Jones Construction.

The Point Aconi Generating Station project ran into delays as a result of cost overruns, resulting in a series of prolonged contractual disputes that arose between 1991 and 1992. Jones Power Corporation claimed millions of dollars in additional compensation and a July 28, 1992 memorandum of understanding between Mitsui & Co. (Point Aconi) Ltd. and Jones Power Co. fixed compensation for Jones Power Corporation at $118 million. The companies agreed to complete the project on November 5, 1992, and leave the contractual dispute after the project's conclusion. Additional documents were discovered after the MOU had been signed but were deemed to be protected by solicitor-client privilege or litigation privilege as detailed in Mitsui & Co. (Point Aconi) Ltd. v. Jones Power Co. which is referenced as [2000] NSJ no. 258; 2000 NSCA 96; Mitsui & Co. (Point Aconi) Ltd. was removed from the Nova Scotia Registry of Joint Stock on June 23, 2003, after legal proceedings were completed.

Construction of the plant was overshadowed by the resignation of Premier John Buchanan upon his appointment to the Senate of Canada in the wake of a corruption scandal relating to his tenure as premier. The selection of a new leader for the governing Progressive Conservative Party, Donald Cameron, took place on February 26, 1991. Cameron made a surprise announcement on January 9, 1992, that his government would privatize Nova Scotia Power Corporation to remove public responsibility for the utility's $2.4 billion debt; Cameron stated that the debt had hurt the province's credit rating and that there had been allegations of political interference for setting electricity rates and decisions to build large power projects. The $850 million initial public offering for 85 million shares of the utility took place on August 12, 1992.

The Point Aconi Generating Station began operating in March 1994 and was officially opened in a ceremony on August 12, 1994, however construction was not completed until later in the fall of 1994 and the plant didn't begin commercial operation until January 1, 1995.

Point Aconi was originally rated to produce 183 MW (gross) by burning 65 tons/hr of local coal and 15.5 tons/hr of limestone. The Ahlstrom Pyropower circulating fluidized-bed (CFB) combustion system was designed to achieve a 90% reduction in SO_{2} emissions and a 65% to 75% reduction in NO_{x} emissions—very respectable numbers in 1994, when the plant began operation.

After initial production issues at the Point Aconi facility were resolved, Nova Scotia Power Corporation closed and decommissioned the 65-year-old Seaboard Generating Station in 1997.

== Operation ==
In the first years of operation the boiler was plagued by serious problems with fouling and corrosion. By 1999 the unit had an average capacity factor of 50% and a forced outage rate of 30%. A switch to a fuel blend including petroleum coke and design changes to the boiler solved these problems. By 2005 the capacity factor was increased to 92% and the outage rate reduced to under 2%.

The Point Aconi Generating Station has one 165 MW unit (name plate capacity 186 MW). Its boiler was supplied by Finland's Ahlstrom Pyropower. The plant burns bituminous coal and petroleum coke in a variety of blends, which is transported to the facility using semi-trailer trucks from a bulk ship unloading pier in Sydney Harbour near the community of Whitney Pier. The unit is a fluidized bed combustor built for NO_{x} and SO_{2}, control. The station has a fabric filter baghouse for particulate control. Point Aconi station is the only Nova Scotia Power Thermal plant without activated carbon injection system to control mercury emissions as it is an inherently lower emitter due to the injection of limestone into the process. Fly ash and bottom ash is handled dry and land-filled. The unit has one chimney 100 m (330 ft) above ground.

The drum-type reheat CFB boiler was designed to produce 547,550 kg/h (1,207,150 lb/h) of steam (maximum continuous rating) at 12,000 kPa (1,800 psi) and 538 °C (1,000 °F). Toshiba Corp. supplied the multicylinder, tandem-compound steam turbine-generator. The 3,600-rpm generator is totally enclosed and has a cylindrical rotor whose winding is directly cooled by hydrogen at 210 kPa (30 psi). The generator is rated at 217 MVA and has a power factor of 0.85.

Point Aconi's coal-handling system comprises an active 27,500-ton storage pile; an inactive storage pile of identical size; receiving hoppers, conveyors, crushing equipment; and four in-plant storage bunkers. The conveying system can handle 440 tons of coal per hour or about 550,000 tons per year. The limestone-handling system consists of receiving hoppers and conveyors common to the coal system, crushers, dryers, storage silos, and a pneumatic conveyor leading to two in-plant storage bunkers. Limestone also arrives by truck, at the rate of about 165,000 tons per year.

The in-plant ash-handling system conveys fly ash from hoppers under the baghouse, economizer, and air heater, as well as bottom ash from the combustor, to either of two silos located outside the powerhouse. Once in the silos, the ash is conditioned with water, loaded into trucks, and transported to a disposal site located next to the plant.

Point Aconi uses a once-through circulating seawater system. Seawater is drawn from 1,000 m (3,300 ft) offshore at a depth of 11 m (36 ft) through a velocity cap intake structure. A tunnel 40 m (130 ft) below the seabed connects the offshore velocity cap to the onshore pump house. The two-pass, surface-type deaerating condenser operates at 1 inch HgA.

The Point Aconi Generating Station consumes 189,000 tonnes of coal and 213,000 tonnes of petroleum coke per year and currently generates approximately 6.8% of the province's electricity and produces roughly 10.07% of the province's air pollution, including hydrochloric acid, sulphuric acid, hexachlorobenzene and mercury. In 2007, it created 1.465 million tonnes of greenhouse gases. In 2017 it reported 1,188,377 tonnes carbon dioxide equivalent under Nova Scotia's Cap-and Trade regulations.

Nova Scotia Power anticipates that the Point Aconi generating station will be shut down by 2029.

== Coal supply ==
The Point Aconi Generating Station was originally designed to burn high sulphur coal mined in the Sydney Coal Field, which it sits atop. The primary source of coal was to be from the Prince Colliery, located 2 km (1.2 mi) east of the generating station property. The Prince Colliery was owned by the federal Crown corporation Cape Breton Development Corporation (DEVCO) which was beset with production problems at its three remaining collieries during the mid-late 1990s as a result of flooding, roof collapses and labour difficulties. The instability of locally mined coal forced Nova Scotia Power to import coal from the United States and South America beginning in 1998 to supplement the supply from DEVCO.

From 1998 to 2000, Nova Scotia Power brought imported coal into Nova Scotia at the Martin Marietta Materials aggregate loading facility in Auld's Cove on the Strait of Canso. That required coal ordered for the Point Aconi Generating Station and Lingan Generating Station to be transported by the Cape Breton and Central Nova Scotia Railway to the DEVCO coal washing plant at Victoria Junction, and the coal destined for the Point Aconi Generating Station was trucked the final distance to the plant. DEVCO closed the Prince Colliery, its last operating coal mine, on November 23, 2001; ironically, the original reason for constructing the Point Aconi Generating Station had been to secure the long-term viability of the Prince Colliery.

== See also ==
- List of power stations in Canada
