= Nova Scotia Power =

Electricity company in Canada

Nova Scotia Power Inc.
- Type: Subsidiary
- Industry: Energy
- Predecessor: Nova Scotia Power Commission, Nova Scotia Light and Power Company, Limited
- Founded: 1972 (as Nova Scotia Power Corporation)
- Headquarters: Halifax, Nova Scotia, Canada
- Area served: Nova Scotia
- Key people: Peter Gregg, President & CEO
- Products: Electricity
- Number of employees: 1700 (2013)
- Parent: Emera
- Website: www.nspower.ca

Nova Scotia Power Inc. is a vertically integrated electric utility in Nova Scotia, Canada. It is privately owned by Emera and regulated by the provincial government via the Nova Scotia Utility and Review Board (NSUARB). Nova Scotia Power provides electricity to 520,000 residential, commercial and industrial customers in Nova Scotia.

== History ==
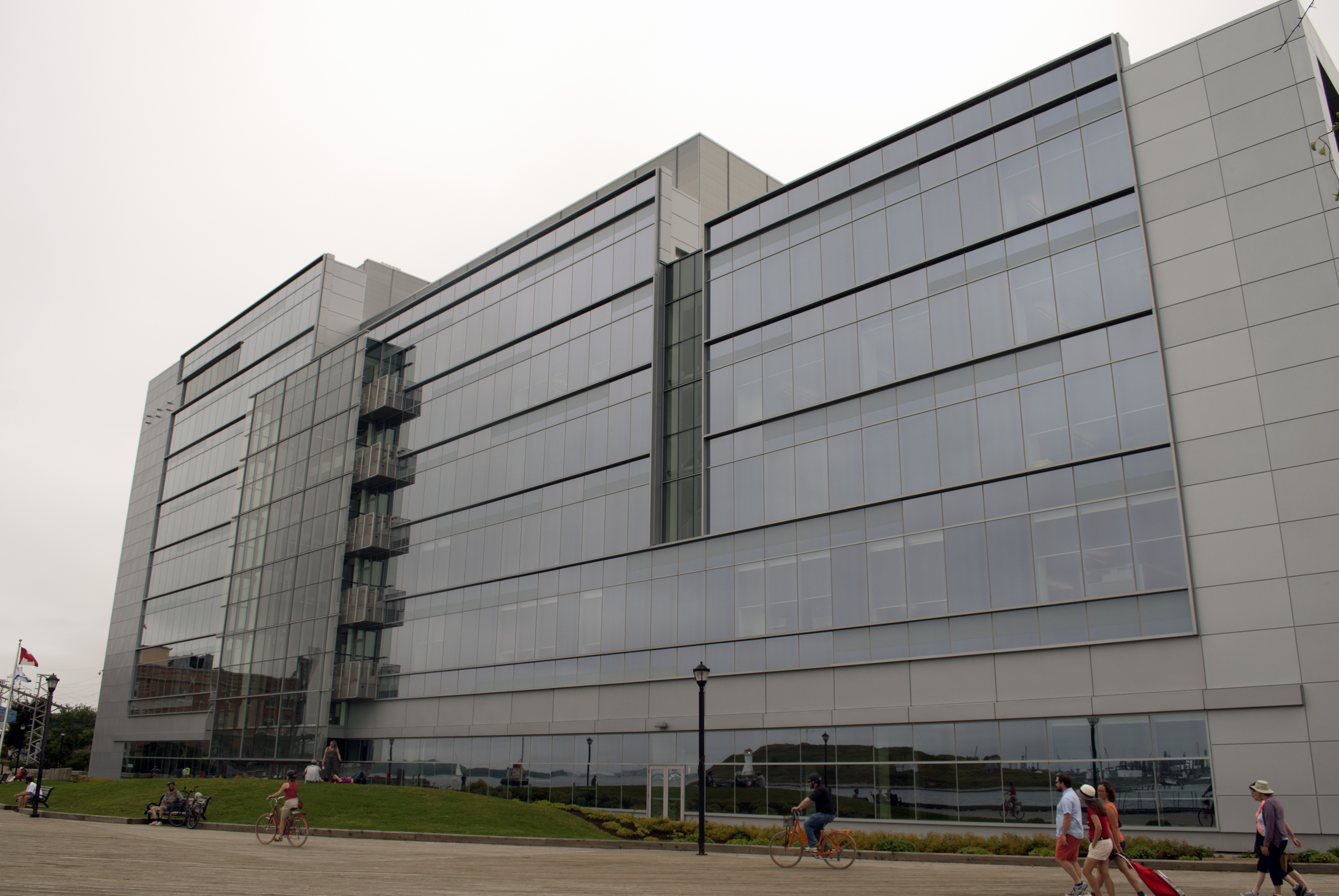
Emera head office

=== 20th century ===
The Nova Scotia Power Commission was formed in 1919 by the provincial government, following the lead of several other Canadian provinces in establishing Crown corporation electrical utilities. The commission constructed and opened its first hydro plant at Tantallon the following year. Throughout the 1920s-1960s, the commission grew as private and municipal owned hydro plants and electrical utilities went bankrupt or sold their assets. In 1960, Nova Scotia was connected to the New Brunswick Electric Power Commission in the first electrical inter-connection between provinces in Canada. The Nova Scotia Power Commission underwent unprecedented expansion during the late 1960s when five new thermal generating stations were constructed to meet the growing residential and industrial demand in the province.

On January 27, 1972, the Government of Nova Scotia acquired Nova Scotia Light and Power Company, Limited (NSLP), an investor-owned utility, leasing its assets to the renamed Nova Scotia Power Corporation (NSPC). In 1984, NSPC opened the world's first tidal power generating station on the Annapolis River at Annapolis Royal. This technology, similar to hydroelectric dams, did not become globally widespread. In 1992, NSPC was privatized by the provincial government of Premier Donald Cameron in what was then the largest private equity transaction in Canadian history. Cameron's government had been under heavy pressure to control provincial deficits and debt servicing thus the controversial decision to sell the Crown corporation. This privatization created Nova Scotia Power Incorporated (NSPI). On December 2, 1998, NSPI shareholders voted to restructure the company to create a holding company which would be shareholder-owned, with the regulated utility being a wholly owned subsidiary of the holding company. On December 9, 1998, NSPI received approval to establish NS Power Holdings Incorporated and NSPI shareholders exchanged their shares in NSPI for shares in NS Power Holdings Inc. on a one-to-one basis on January 1, 1999. Common shares in NS Power Holdings Inc. began trading on the Toronto Stock Exchange and Montreal Stock Exchange on January 6, 1999. The NS Power Holdings Inc. name was changed to Emera Incorporated on July 17, 2000.

=== 21st century ===
In the wake of major winter storms in 2004, NS Power came under increasing criticism from the Union of Nova Scotia Municipalities, energy-oriented public interest groups, and provincial political parties for a perceived lack of investment in the monitoring, preventive maintenance and instrumenting of its electric grid. A study was eventually commissioned from SNC-Lavalin to explore a "regional system operator" to relieve NS Power of the control of the grid, but Nova Scotia Power remains a single, vertically integrated utility as of 2014.

==== NB Power controversy ====
Concerns were raised by the Nova Scotia government regarding the future of Nova Scotia Power and the province's renewable energy strategy in the aftermath of a tentative C$4.8 billion deal for the sale of most assets of NB Power to Hydro-Québec, on October 29, 2009. The government of Nova Scotia was concerned that the deal could affect its plan to develop renewable energy sources for exports to New England in competition with Quebec's publicly owned utility, as all existing transmission routes were through New Brunswick. The sale was reduced in scope due to public pressure in NB, then dropped entirely. The Shawn Graham government fell partly as a result of the failure of these deals and the lack of public consultation prior to pursuing them.

In partial response to concerns about being cut off from the New England market, NS Premier Darrell Dexter began to pursue a "loop" strategy for Nova Scotia's electric interconnection, connecting Muskrat Falls in Labrador to Cape Breton, thence to mainland Nova Scotia and, via subsea DC transmission cable, New England. This would connect NL, NS and potentially PEI with its peers in FERC Eastern Interconnection directly without relying on Quebec or New Brunswick. Thus, any future deal to extend Quebec's ownership or Quebec's interconnection could not prevent dealings between peers in the Eastern Interconnection. Nova Scotia Power has not announced any plans for a direct interconnection with the United States as of 2014.

==== Maritime Link ====
On November 18, 2010, Nova Scotia Power's parent company, Emera, announced a $6.2 billion deal with Newfoundland and Labrador's Nalcor Energy to develop the Phase 1 of the Lower Churchill Project, including transmission infrastructure to bring power to Nova Scotia from Muskrat Falls, Labrador. By providing long-term, guaranteed access to a block of hydroelectric power at a fixed price, the deal served the longstanding policy goal of reducing Nova Scotia's dependence on coal-fired generation. A new regulated utility registered in Nova Scotia, Nova Scotia Power Maritime Link Incorporated (NSPML), was formed to build and maintain the Maritime Link, including overhead power lines between the Granite Canal Hydroelectric Generating Station and Cape Ray, Newfoundland and a submarine power cable across the Cabot Strait. In 2013, Nova Scotia Power signed an agreement to act as the agent of NSPML in commercial relationships with neighbouring utilities. Nova Scotia Power also agreed to provide transmission services for Nalcor Energy in Nova Scotia, allowing electricity to be traded among all four Atlantic provinces.

==== 2012 audit ====
An audit commissioned by the Nova Scotia Utility and Review Board (NSUARB) and conducted by Liberty Consulting Group in 2012 found that NSP overcharged its customers by $21.8 million because it paid too much for fuel over a two-year period. The audit was heavily redacted when first released in July 2009, but the NSUARB ordered the release of the unredacted report in September 2009, arguing that it would not harm NSP's ability to carry on its business.

== Energy conservation ==
=== Programs administered by Nova Scotia Power ===
As NS implemented its climate and demand side management strategies, lobbyists questioned whether the Nova Scotia Power could be trusted to administer a province-wide conservation program designed to prevent having to build any large, new power plant. Its "integrated resource plan" of 2007 indicated that energy conservation is an important element to meet the future electricity needs of Nova Scotia. NS Power began implementing Energy Efficiency & Conservation programs (EEC) for customers in 2008.

Conservation programs for large commercial and industrial electricity users were the first to be launched by NSP, in May 2008. Although electric utilities across Canada commonly administer similar programs, lobbyists accused NSP of potential conflicts of interest, because it was both a vendor of electricity and also the administrator of programs that, if successful, would reduce energy sales.

The utility spent $11.9 million on conservation programs in 2008 and 2009. A third party evaluation confirmed that the programs had saved over 85 million kilowatt-hours of electricity, exceeding the utility's goal of 66 million kilowatt-hours. In April 2009, the utility applied to the Nova Scotia Utility and Review Board for approval to spend $23 million on conservation programs in 2010. The spending was offset by a reduction in power rates under Nova Scotia's fuel adjustment mechanism due to lower-than-expected oil and gas prices in 2009.

=== Independently administered programs ===
Public consultations held in Nova Scotia in 2008 produced a report recommending the creation of an independent demand side management administration. Conserve Nova Scotia, a government agency founded in 2006, was recast as the agency responsible for "the planning, development, and co-ordination of policies and programs for energy efficiency and conservation, including public education and behavioural change" in 2009.

A new non-profit agency, Efficiency Nova Scotia, was created in 2010 to offer demand side management programs previously offered by Nova Scotia Power. The agency is led by an independent board of directors and regulated by the Nova Scotia Utility and Review Board. Its programs are funded by a DSM Cost Recovery Rider (DCRR) on customers' power bills that varies according to each customer's rate class and energy consumption. The average residential customer pays $63 per year for conservation programs as of 2014. Average payments by medium industrial customers dropped from over $200/month in 2012 to just over $100 in 2013 and 2014.

For 2012, ENS claimed that it "helped Nova Scotians save $100 million in electricity costs. Energy savings totaled 141.8 million kilowatt hours, enough electricity to take 14,000 average homes off the grid" on expenditures of $43.7 million - a total cost under $0.31 per kilowatt hour for permanent savings that recur year over year. The cash-on-cash return on investment province-wide is well over 100% for the entire history of Efficiency Nova Scotia.

== Smart grid proposals ==
In October 2013 NSP announced it would extend Schneider Electric's GIS technology with embedded OMS and DMS technologies to "efficiently monitor, analyze, and manage its network of nearly 500,000 customers for more rapid response to power outages." NSP accordingly appears to be following Schneider's blueprint for grid evolution.

=== Municipal utilities ===
In 2013, the Town of Lunenburg Electric Utility (TLEU) initiated a smart meter pilot project. Participating customers were provided with meters that could record power consumption in real time, and a wireless network was set up to communicate with the meters. Municipal Electric Utilities of Nova Scotia Cooperative Ltd. and the Nova Scotia Department of Energy had previously studied ways to reduce or shift demand during peak times as a way to reduce power costs for customers served by the municipal utilities. NSP had not piloted smart meters as of April 2013.

=== Time-of-day power rates ===
As of 2014, time-of-day power rates are only available for customers using approved electric thermal storage heating systems, who pay between 14 and 19 cents/kW·h on-peak and 7.3 cents/kW·h off-peak. The rates and necessary metering equipment have not been offered to other customers who requested them. Dalhousie Professor Dr. Larry Hughes argues that they should be more widely deployed to encourage conserving power on peak, ensuring that electric vehicles and other discretionary devices charge off-peak, and otherwise levelling usage.

An increasing amount of power is coming from wind which is generated at unpredictable times, either on or off peak, suggesting a dynamic electricity pricing scheme might be required and thus a more functional fully networked power grid far beyond the capabilities of typical "smart meters."

== Smart meters ==
In June 2017, NSP withdrew its application for a pilot project to test wireless smart meters, under criticism from consumer advocates. It instead proposed that it "would prepare a new application for provincewide installation of the meters, including a cost-benefit analysis, which it will submit to the board sometime this summer" i.e. before September 2017.

On June 12 2018 the Nova Scotia Utility and Review Board approved the application by Nova Scotia Power to install new Smart Meters throughout the Province at a cost of up to $133.2 million. Project costs included all computers, systems, installation costs, communications, administration and financing as well as new meters. Costs also included a $13.4 million contingency. The project began in the fall of 2019 and NSP plans to be finished in 2021.

== Generating facilities ==
NSPI has a generating capacity of 2,368 megawatts and produces 13,000 gigawatt hours of electricity each year. As of 2014, the utility operates 43 power stations, excluding wind turbines, using sources of energy including coal, petcoke, natural gas and renewables.

=== Thermal power stations ===
Station	Image	Location	Fuel	Generating Capacity	Unit	Net Capacity (MW)	Commissioned
Lingan Generating Station		46°14′12″N 60°2′14″W	Coal/Petcoke	620 MW	1	155	1979
Lingan Generating Station		46°14′12″N 60°2′14″W	Coal/Petcoke	620 MW	2	155	1980
Lingan Generating Station		46°14′12″N 60°2′14″W	Coal/Petcoke	620 MW	3	155	1983
Lingan Generating Station		46°14′12″N 60°2′14″W	Coal/Petcoke	620 MW	4	155	1984
Point Aconi Generating Station		46°19′12″N 60°19′50″W	Coal/Petcoke	183 MW	1	183	1994
Point Tupper Generating Station		45°35′14″N 61°20′53″W	Coal/Petcoke	154 MW	1	154	1973 (oil) 1987 (coal)
Trenton Generating Station		45°37′13″N 62°38′53″W	Coal/Petcoke	307 MW	5	152	1969
Trenton Generating Station		45°37′13″N 62°38′53″W	Coal/Petcoke	307 MW	6	155	1991
Tufts Cove Generating Station		44°40′35″N 63°35′46″W	Oil/Natural Gas	500 MW	1	81	1965
Tufts Cove Generating Station		44°40′35″N 63°35′46″W	Oil/Natural Gas	500 MW	2	93	1972
Tufts Cove Generating Station		44°40′35″N 63°35′46″W	Oil/Natural Gas	500 MW	3	147	1976
Tufts Cove Generating Station		44°40′35″N 63°35′46″W	Oil/Natural Gas	500 MW	4	49	2003
Tufts Cove Generating Station		44°40′35″N 63°35′46″W	Oil/Natural Gas	500 MW	5	49	2004
Tufts Cove Generating Station		44°40′35″N 63°35′46″W	Oil/Natural Gas	500 MW	6	50	2012

=== Combustion turbines ===
- Burnside Combustion Turbine
- Tusket Combustion Turbine
- Victoria Junction Combustion Turbine

=== Tidal ===
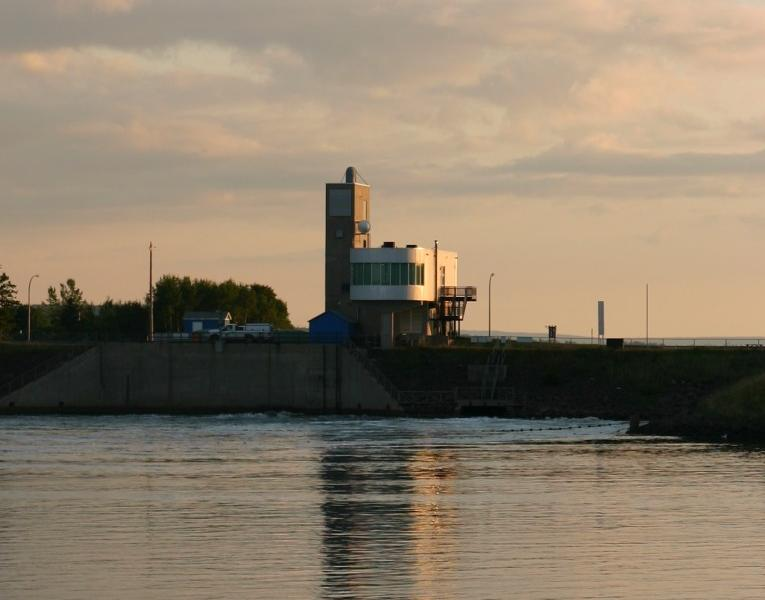
20 MW Annapolis Royal Generating Station

- Annapolis Royal Generating Station

=== Wind ===
- Grand Etang
- Little Brook
- Nutby Mountain
- Digby Neck
- South Canoe Wind Energy Project (proposed)

=== Hydroelectric ===
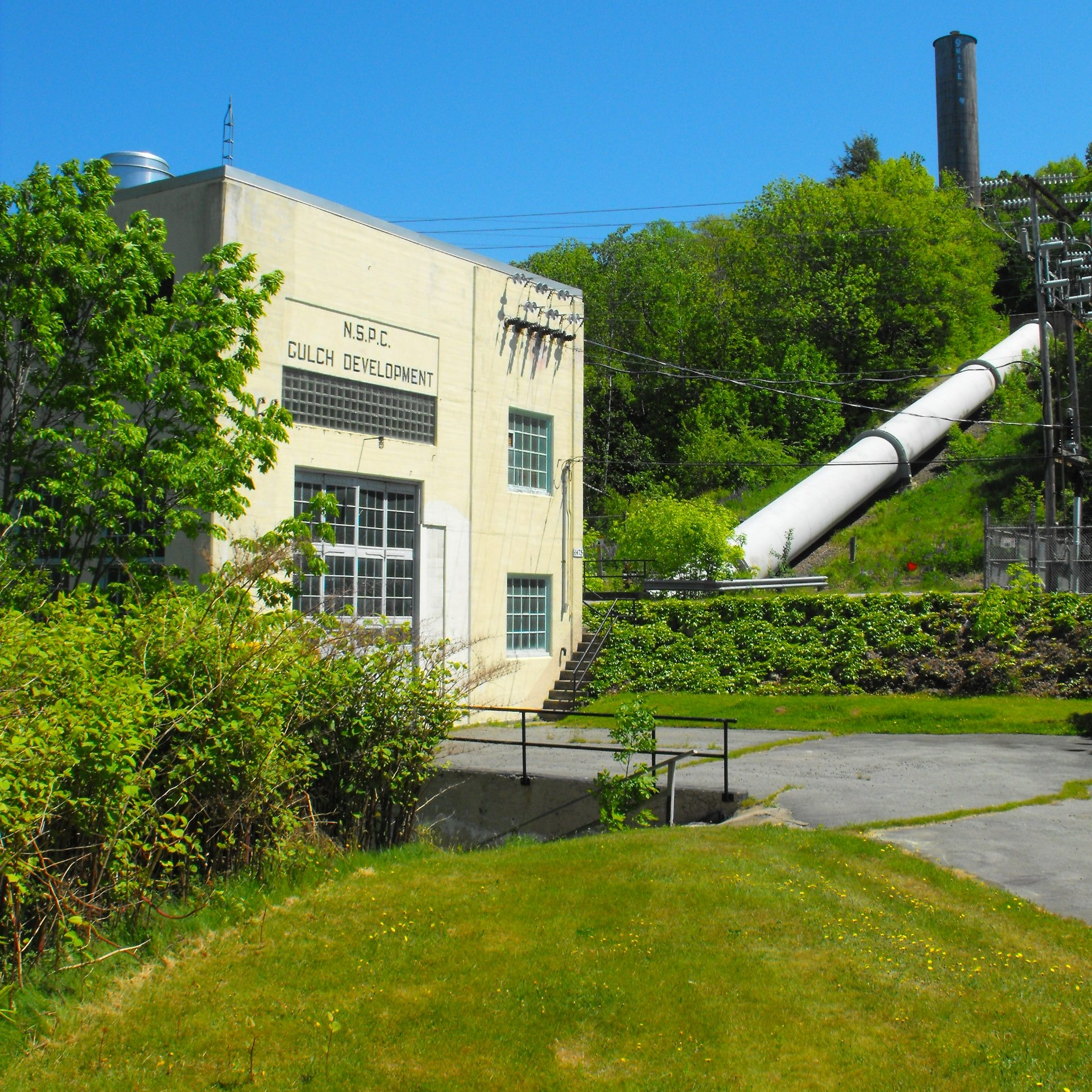
6 MW Gulch power plant, one of two hydroelectric plants in the Bear River System

- Avon River System
- Bear River System
- Black River System
- Dickey Brook
- Fall River System
- Lequille
- Mersey System
- Nictaux Falls
- Paradise
- St. Margaret's Bay
- Sheet Harbour System
- Roseway
- Tusket Falls
- Wreck Cove

=== Purchased power ===
NSPI also purchases energy from independent power producers who generate electricity using wind, hydro, and biomass (including landfill gas). Notable examples include wind farms at Pubnico Point, Lingan, and Dalhousie Mountain.

== Major customers ==
=== Provincial ===
- The vast majority of residents of Nova Scotia are direct retail customers of NS Power's distribution network, receiving bills directly from NSP.

=== Industrial ===
- Intertape Polymer Inc. (Truro)
- Michelin (Bridgewater, Granton, Waterville)
- Port Hawkesbury Paper (Point Tupper)

=== Municipal utilities ===
There are six municipal utilities currently operating in the province. The municipal utilities jointly own the Municipal Electric Utilities of Nova Scotia Cooperative Ltd. (MEUNS). Together, they serve under 15,000 people, or about 2% of the provincial population.

- Antigonish Electric Utility (Town of Antigonish)
- Berwick Electric Light Commission (Town of Berwick)
- Canso Electric Light Commission (former Town of Canso)
- Lunenburg Electric Utility (Town of Lunenburg)
- Mahone Bay Electric Utility (Town of Mahone Bay)
- Riverport Electric Light Commission (Village of Riverport)

==== Relationship with Nova Scotia Power ====
The majority of the municipal utilities purchase electricity through an interconnection with Nova Scotia Power; however, some, including the Berwick Electric Light Commission, have supplementary generating assets such as small hydro stations. In 2012, MEUNS successfully opposed charges of $28–32 million that NSP had requested before the Nova Scotia Utility and Review Board (NSUARB). The proposed charges would have been a one-time "exit fee" payable by the municipal utilities in exchange for ending NSP's monopoly on the wholesale supply of electricity. The NSUARB found that a 2005 agreement that allowed third-party suppliers to sell power over NSP's grid gave the municipal utilities the right to purchase power from third parties without paying an exit fee, as long as their businesses did not substantially change or expand.

==== Renewable energy plans ====
In 2014, Mahone Bay, Antigonish, and Berwick signed an agreement to develop a 16 MW wind farm in Hants County as co-owners of the Alternative Resource Energy Authority. The project is expected to help the towns' municipal utilities meet Nova Scotia's target of producing 25 percent of electricity from renewable sources by 2015, and to pay financial dividends to the three towns for the next 25 years.
