= Melissa Fay Greene =

American nonfiction author (born 1952)

Melissa Fay Greene

Melissa Fay Greene (born December 30, 1952) is an American nonfiction author. A 1975 graduate of Oberlin College, Greene is the author of six books of nonfiction, a two-time National Book Award finalist, a 2011 inductee into the Georgia Writers Hall of Fame, and a 2015 recipient of the John Simon Guggenheim Fellowship in the Creative Arts.

Greene has written for The New Yorker, The New York Times, The Washington Post, New York Magazine, Newsweek, Life Magazine, Good Housekeeping, The Atlantic, Reader's Digest, The Wilson Quarterly, Redbook, MS Magazine, CNN.com and Salon.com.

== Life ==
Born into a Jewish family in Macon, Georgia, and raised in Dayton, Ohio. Melissa Fay Greene lives in Atlanta with her husband, Don Samuel, a criminal defense attorney, and numerous children. Married in 1979 in Savannah, Melissa and Don are the parents of nine children.

== Publications ==
=== Praying for Sheetrock ===
Published in 1991, Praying for Sheetrock is the true story of the often-criminal heyday of the good old boys in McIntosh County on the rural coast of Georgia and the rise of civil rights there in the mid-1970s. It won the Robert F. Kennedy Center for Justice and Human Rights Book Award, the Chicago Tribune Heartland Prize, the Anisfield-Wolf Book Award, the Quality Paperback Book Club New Visions Award, was a finalist for the National Book Award and the National Book Critics Circle Award. SHEETROCK was named one of the "100 Best Works of American Journalism of the 20th Century" by a panel convened by the journalism faculty of New York University and one of Entertainment Weekly's "The New Classics: Best Books of the Last 25 Years."

=== The Temple Bombing ===
The Temple Bombing (1996) investigates an incident of domestic terrorism during the era of "massive resistance" to desegregation in Atlanta in 1958 when an Atlanta synagogue known as "The Temple" was bombed by a homegrown Neo-Nazi organization. Rabbi Jacob M. Rothschild, a friend and colleague of Rev. Martin Luther King Jr., and other white and African-American leaders of the civil rights movement, spoke and acted on behalf of civil equality despite the precarious social position of Southern Jews and the fears of his congregants that the violent racists would come after them.

The book was a National Book Award finalist and winner of the Southern Book Critics Circle Award, the Georgia Author of the Year Award of the Georgia Writers Association, the Georgia Historical Society Award, the Hadassah Myrtle Wreath Award, the Salon Book Award, and the American Civil Liberties Union National Civil Liberties Award.

The infamous 1915 lynching—by a white mob including civic leaders—of the Jewish 31-year-old manager of the Atlanta Pencil Company, Leo Frank, wrongly convicted and posthumously pardoned for the murder of 13-year-old child worker Mary Phagan, occurred within this same community: Frank was a member of The Temple.

The Academy Award-winning film Driving Miss Daisy (Best Picture, 1989), written by prize-winning Atlanta native Alfred Uhry, makes dramatic use of the Temple bombing incident—Miss Daisy is a Temple member—though the chronology is fictionalized.

=== Last Man Out ===
Last Man Out (2002) tells the story of the 1958 mining disaster in Springhill, Nova Scotia and the absurdist American white supremacist coda to the spectacular rescue of a handful of Canadian men. Nearly a week after the collapse of the deepest coal mine in the world, long after all the missing were presumed dead, two groups of miners—injured and desperately dehydrated—were discovered a vertical mile underground. The worldwide focus on the rescue of the first group—through newspapers, television news reports, and movie theater news-reels—inspired a few highly placed officials in the administration of Governor Marvin Griffin of Georgia, a staunch segregationist, to invite the survivors and their families to vacation on the coastal resort of Jekyll Island. The state officials conceived it as a PR gimmick that would enlighten the world about the Georgia coast as a tourist destination equal to Florida's beaches. However, a second group of miners was found alive; when the survivors were finally extricated, the "last man out" turned out to be a Black Nova Scotian, Maurice Ruddick. All tourist accommodations in Georgia were segregated. Rather than a brilliant PR coup, Georgia officials inadvertently insulted Ruddick, a Canadian hero, causing a minor international incident.

Last Man Out was named a Best Book of the Year by Chicago Tribune, The Globe and Mail, the Cox newspaper chain, and the New York Public Library.

=== There Is No Me Without You: One Woman's Odyssey to Save Her Country's Children ===
This 2006 book illuminates the Ethiopian orphan crisis caused by the HIV/AIDS pandemic in Africa through the portrait of one person on the frontlines: a middle-aged Ethiopian foster mother, Mrs. Haregewoin Teferra, and the scores of children crossing her threshold. It was winner of Elle magazine's Elle's Lettres Readers Prize, a finalist for the J. Anthony Lukas Book Prize, an American Library Association Notable Book and Booksense Notable Book, and named a Best Book of the Year by Publishers Weekly, Christian Science Monitor, Entertainment Weekly, Chicago Tribune, and The Atlanta Constitution.

There Is No Me Without You has been translated into 15 languages.

=== No Biking in the House without a Helmet ===
[Farrar, Straus & Giroux, 2011] Greene's first humorous book and first memoir is an overview of family life with nine children from three continents, composed, according to the acknowledgements, with the consent and veto-power of all family members.

No Biking was named a Best Audio Book of 2011 and was an Oprah Mother's Day Pick.

== Awards and honors ==
2015: John Simon Guggenheim Fellowship

2013: Georgia Governor's Award for the Arts & Humanities

2011: Induction into the Georgia Writers Hall of Fame

2010: Honorary Doctorate of Letters, Emory University

2006: Winner, Elle magazine's Elle's Lettres Readers Prize

2006: Finalist, J. Anthony Lukas Book Prize

1996: The Southern Book Critics Circle Award

1996: Hadassah Myrtle Wreath Award

1996: Georgia Author of the Year Award

1996: ACLU National Civil Liberties Award

1996: Finalist, The National Book Award in Nonfiction

1992: Winner, Robert F. Kennedy Book Award

1992: Lyndhurst Foundation Fellowship

1992: Winner, The Lillian Smith Book Award

1992: Winner, Anisfield-Wolf Book Award

1991: Winner, Chicago Tribune Heartland Prize for Nonfiction

1991: Finalist in Nonfiction, The National Book Critics Circle Award

1991: Finalist, National Book Award in Nonfiction

1991: Winner, The Salon Book Prize
