= Ardon Bess =

Canadian actor

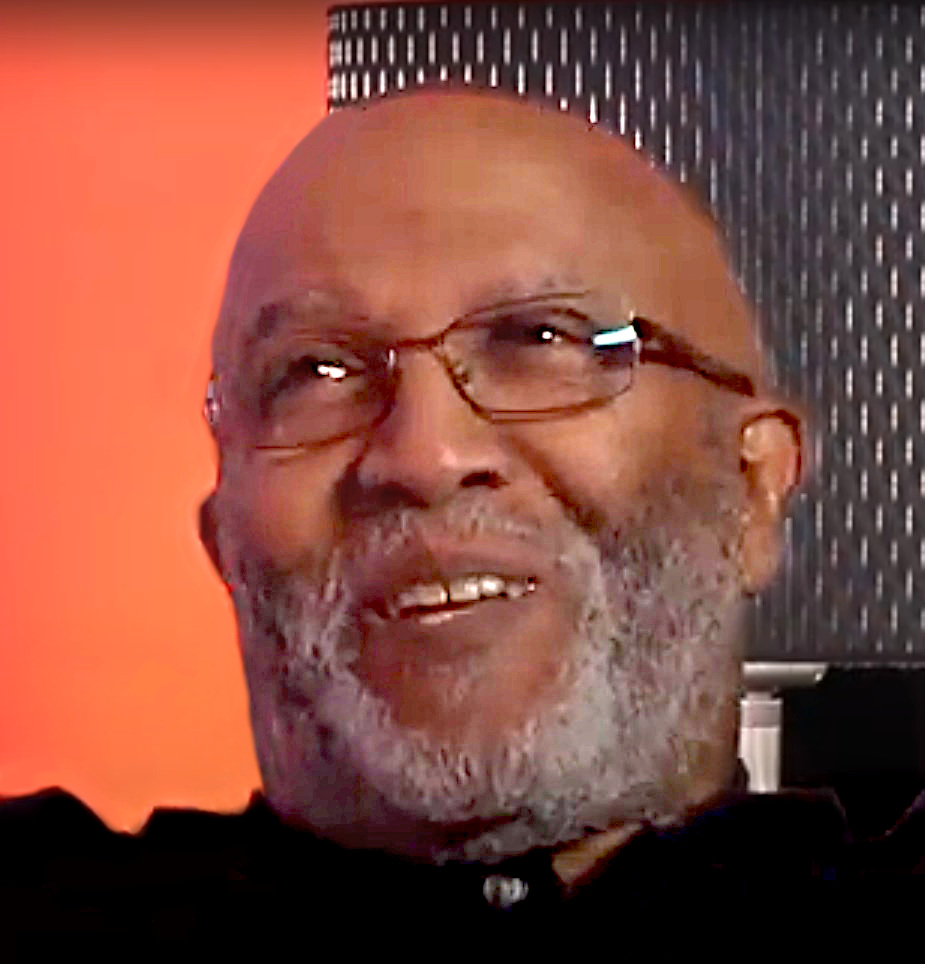
- Bess in 2013
- Born: 1941 (age 84–85); Kingstown, Saint Vincent and the Grenadines
- Occupation: actor
- Years active: 1973-present

Ardon Bess (born 1941) is a Canadian actor best known for appearing in a Heritage Minutes short film about the 1958 Springhill mining disaster portraying survivor Maurice Ruddick, and for playing Nestor "The Jester" Best in the sitcom King of Kensington.

== Early life and education ==
Bess was born in Kingstown, St. Vincent and the Grenadines. After completing his secondary school education in St. Vincent, he became a bank teller. Before moving to Canada, Bess was acting in and directing local amateur theatre in Kingstown. He moved to Canada in 1964 and first lived in Oakville, Ontario with his father. He briefly studied architecture at Ryerson Polytechnical Institute in Toronto. Bess was encouraged by a classmate at Ryerson to go to an acting audition which took place after a soccer practice they were both attending. Following that audition, Bess was offered his first professional theatre role as Sakini in a production of The Teahouse of the August Moon. Subsequently, Bess left Ryerson to attend the National Theatre School of Canada.

== Career ==
He has also appeared in other films and television roles including Trailer Park Boys, How She Move, Take the Lead, The Ladies Man, Kung Fu: The Legend Continues, Prom Night, King of Kensington, and Jewel. He earned a Gemini Award nomination for Best Performance by an Actor in a Featured Supporting Role in a Dramatic Program or Mini-Series for his role in One Heart Broken Into Song.

In 2000, Bess' role of Don in the short film My Father’s Hands earned him a Golden Sheaf Award in the category of best performance by a male.

== Filmography ==
=== Film ===
Year	Title	Role	Notes
1975	My Pleasure Is My Business	Ambassador	
1975	Lions for Breakfast	Police officer	Uncredited
1976	Love at First Sight	Auditor	
1978	High-Ballin'	Policeman	
1979	H. G. Wells' The Shape of Things to Come	Merrick	
1980	Prom Night	Teacher	
1980	Head On	Poker Player	
1980	Deadline	Limousine Driver	
1982	Highpoint	Freightman	Uncredited
1993	Ordinary Magic	Barbershop #2	
1994	Trial by Jury	Albert, Juror	
1995	Soul Survivor	Papa	
1995	Moving Target	Jake	
1999	The 4th Floor	Hardware Owner	
1999	My Father’s Hands	Don	Short film
1999	One Heart Broken Into Song	Serious Cromwell	
2000	After Alice	Lenny	
2000	The Ladies Man	Stage Manager	
2001	On Their Knees	Gas Station Clerk	
2002	The Skulls II	Mr. Beckford	
2002	Jack & Ella	Darrell	
2006	Take the Lead	Smitty	
2007	How She Move	Uncle Cecil	
2008	Saving God	Officer Earle	
2012	Bloodwork	Martel	
2016	A Sunday Kind of Love	Server	
2017	Cardinals	Stanley Axel	
2022	Junior's Giant	Cec	

=== Television ===
Year	Title	Role	Notes
1973	The Starlost	Soldier	Episode: "The Goddess Calabra"
1975–1978	King of Kensington	Nestor Best	63 episodes
1980	The Littlest Hobo	Policeman / Ernie	2 episodes
1984, 1985	Hangin' In	Errol	2 episodes
1985	Reckless Disregard	Jury Foreman	Television film
1985	The Park Is Mine	Daniels	Television film
1985	Check It Out!	Clyde	Episode: "Love on Sale"
1986	Philip Marlowe, Private Eye	Jed Mason	Episode: "Pickup on Noon Street"
1987	CBS Schoolbreak Special	Mr. McLean	Episode: "The Day They Came to Arrest the Book"
1987	Street Legal	Percival	Episode: "Tango Bellarosa"
1987	The Kidnapping of Baby John Doe	Bill Davis	Television film
1987	Friday the 13th: The Series	Hotel Manager	Episode: "Cupid's Quiver"
1987, 1988	Night Heat	Gil Johnson / Tago	2 episodes
1988	Hostage	Garage Attendant	Television film
1988, 1990	T. and T.	Smiling Ryan	2 episodes
1989	The Campbells	Jake	Episode: "Eyes of Angels"
1990	Shining Time Station: 'Tis a Gift	Tucker Cooper	Television film
1993	Heritage Minutes	Maurice Ruddick	Episode: "Maurice Ruddick"
1993	Coming of Age	Condo Salesman	Television film
1993–1996	Kung Fu: The Legend Continues	Brad Poster / Rawlins / Saul	4 episodes
1994	Spenser: The Judas Goat	Winston Boyko	Television film
1994	Ready or Not	Serjak	Episode: "Break Up"
1995	Due South	Rudy Porter	Episode: "An Eye for an Eye"
1995	Triplecross	Ben	Television film
1995	Prince for a Day	Nix	Television film
1996	Mr. and Mrs. Loving	Justice of the Peace	Television film
1996	F/X: The Series	Security Guard Tony	Episode: "High Risk"
1998	The Defenders: Choice of Evils	Counsel Room Guard	Television film
1998	Free of Eden	Businessman	Television film
1999	The Promise	Jury Foreman	Television film
1999	Twice in a Lifetime	Dr. Harold Roth	Episode: "Ashes to Ashes"
2000	D.C.	Old Man	Episode: "Pilot"
2000	On Hostile Ground	Smiley	Television film
2000	Soul Food	Uncle Pete	4 episodes
2000	Songs in Ordinary Time	Earlie's Grandfather	Television film
2001	Laughter on the 23rd Floor	Cecil	Television film
2001	Jewel	Nelson	Television film
2001	Trailer Park Boys	Levi	6 episodes
2001	MythQuest	Baba	Episode: "The Blessing"
2001	Fortier	Dexter Kennedy	Episode: "Soupçons et paranoïa: Part 1"
2002	Sins of the Father	Minister at Church	Television film
2002	Matthew Blackheart: Monster Smasher	Blind Sid	Television film
2002	10,000 Black Men Named George	Daddy Moore	Television film
2002	Power and Beauty	Thomas	Television film
2002	Degrassi: The Next Generation	Wayne	Episode: "Don't Believe the Hype"
2003	Odyssey 5	Congressman Reddling	Episode: "Fossil"
2004	72 Hours: True Crime	Patrick Critton	Episode: "Hijacked"
2004	Doc	Benny Anderson	Episode: "Happy Trails"
2005	Sue Thomas: F.B.Eye	Oscar	Episode: "Bad Girls"
2009	Da Kink in My Hair	Pops	Episode: "Looks Can Be Revealing"
2009	Guns	Sonya's Father	2 episodes
2011	John A.: Birth of a Country	Chief Barber	Television film
2013	Cracked	Attendant	Episode: "Swans"
2014	Remedy	Henry Kozlow	Episode: "Shift/Change"
2016	Four in the Morning	Amadeus	Episode: "The Music"
2017	Kim's Convenience	Arthur	Episode: "Resting Place"
