= Island (short story collection) =

- First edition
- Author: Alistair MacLeod
- Language: English
- Published: 2000
- Publisher: McClelland & Stewart; W. W. Norton & Company
- Publication place: Canada
- Media type: Print (hardback & paperback)
- Pages: 320 (first edition, hardback)
- ISBN: 0-393-05035-1

Island is a book of short stories by Alistair MacLeod, first published in 2000 by McClelland and Stewart.

The book collects all of the short stories published in MacLeod's earlier collections, The Lost Salt Gift of Blood and As Birds Bring Forth the Sun and Other Stories, as well as two previously unpublished stories, "Island" and "Clearances". The volume was published because the success of MacLeod's 1999 debut novel No Great Mischief revived interest in MacLeod's prior work, which was largely out of print by this time.

The book was reprinted in 2017, as Island: The Collected Short Stories 1968–2014 and included a new story, "Remembrances".

== Adaptations ==
In 2018, filmmakers Tom Gentle and Rupert Clague adapted "In The Fall" to screen, choosing to shoot the film in Orkney, Scotland.
