= Springhill mining disasters =

Any of three mining disasters in Springhill, Nova Scotia, Canada (1891, 1956, 1958)

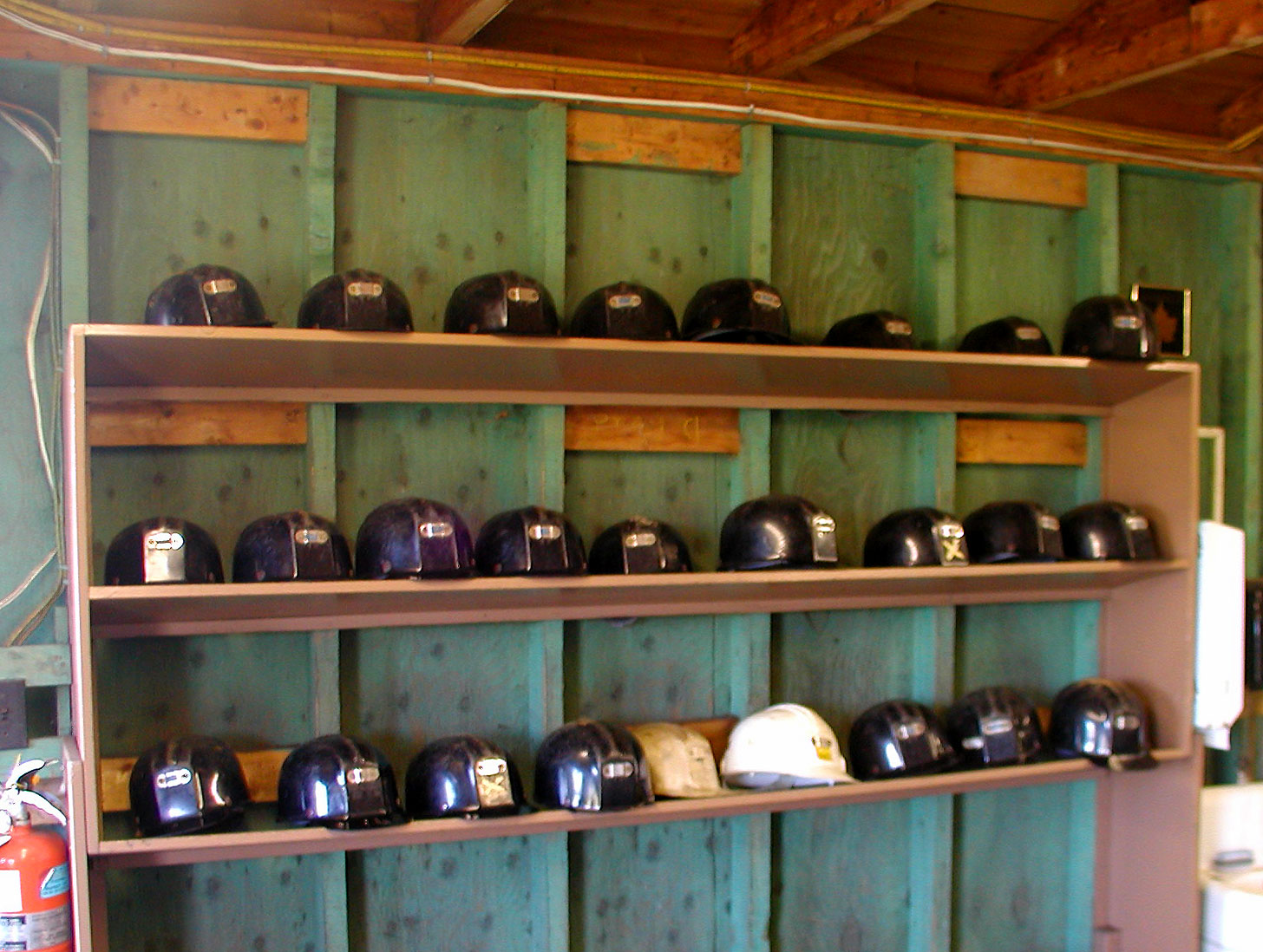
Mine shed at Springhill, NS

Springhill mining disaster may refer to any of three deadly Canadian mining disasters that occurred in 1891, 1956, and 1958 in different mines within the Springhill coalfield, near the town of Springhill in Cumberland County, Nova Scotia. In the 1891 accident, 125 died; in 1956, 39 were killed; and in 1958, 75 miners were killed.

The mines in the Springhill coalfield were established in the 19th century, and by the early 1880s were being worked by the Cumberland Coal & Railway Company Ltd. and the Springhill & Parrsboro Coal & Railway Company Ltd. These entities merged in 1884 to form the Cumberland Railway & Coal Company Ltd., which its investors sold in 1910 to the industrial conglomerate Dominion Coal Company Ltd. (DOMCO). Following the third disaster in 1958, the operator Dominion Steel & Coal Corporation Ltd. (DOSCO), then a subsidiary of the A.V. Roe Canada Company Ltd., shut its mining operations in Springhill, and they were never reopened. As of 2015 the mine properties, among the deepest works in the world, with the No. 2 mine reaching 14,300 feet (4,400 m) and now filled with water, are owned by the government of Nova Scotia, and provide Springhill's industrial park with geothermal heating.

== 1891 explosion ==
Springhill's first mining disaster, the 1891 explosion, killed 125 miners, some of them child laborers between 10 and 13 years old. It occurred at approximately 12:30 pm on February 21, 1891, in the Number 1 and Number 2 collieries, which were joined by a connecting tunnel at the 1,300-foot (400 m) level (below the surface). A fire caused by accumulated coal dust swept through both shafts.

Rescue efforts throughout that afternoon and evening were made easier by the lack of fire in No. 1 and No. 2, but the scale of the disaster was unprecedented in Nova Scotian or Canadian mining history, and the subsequent relief funds saw contributions come in from across the country and the British Empire, including Queen Victoria.

A subsequent inquiry determined that sufficient gas detectors in working order had been present in the two collieries; however, the ignition source of the explosion was never determined, despite investigators having pinpointed its general location.

The song "La Mine" (allegedly traditional) by the French Canadian folk group Le Vent du Nord on their 2009 album La part du feu relates to the 1891 explosion.

== 1956 explosion ==
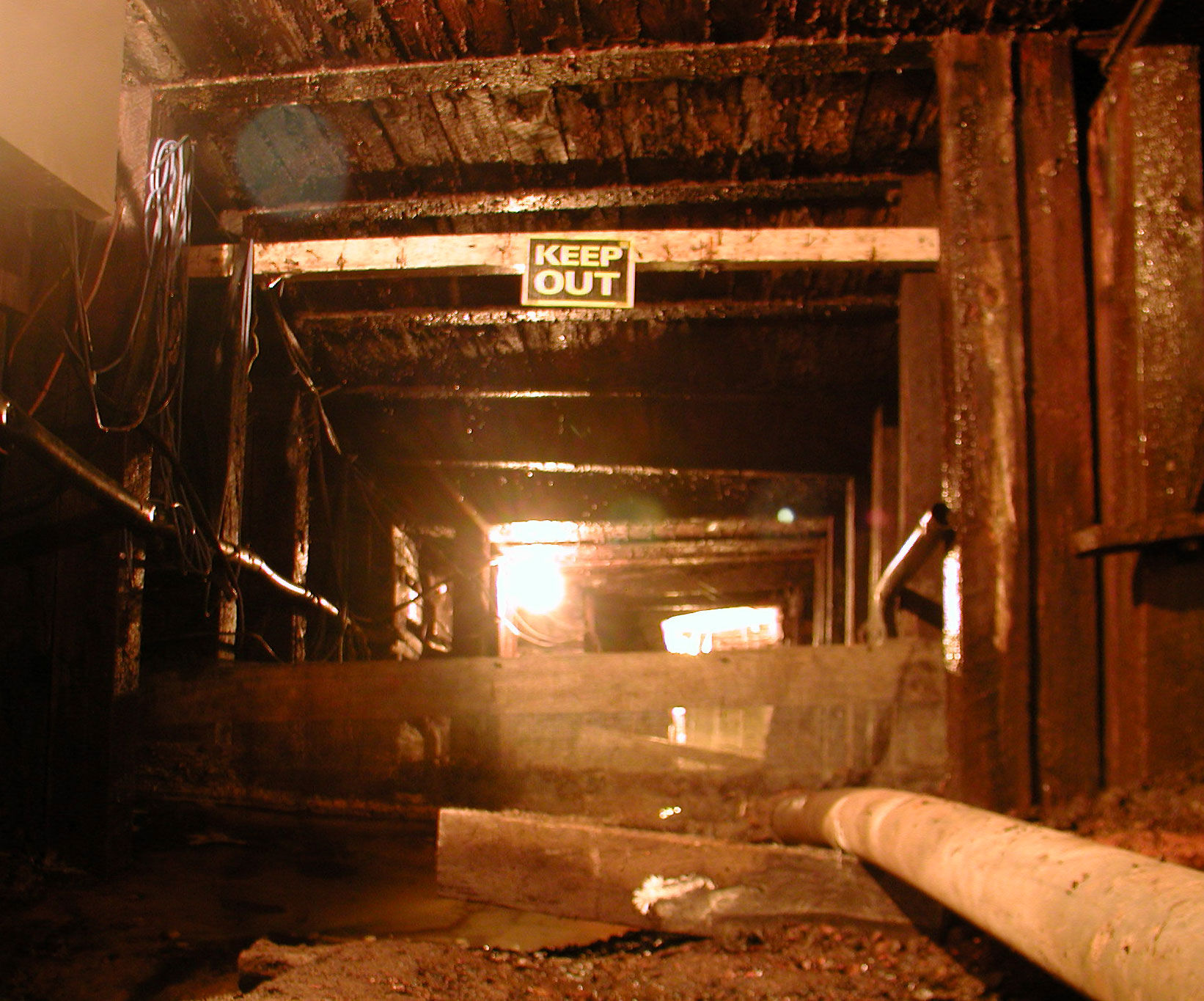
Inside a Springhill, NS mine shaft

The 1956 explosion occurred on November 1, and killed 39 coal miners, but 88 others underground were rescued because of improved equipment. Prior to the blast, a mine train was hauling a load of fine coal dust up to the surface of the Number 4 colliery for removal from the pithead, and encountered a heavy flow of ventilation air being forced down the shaft by surface fans. The flow of air disturbed the contents of the ascending train cars and spread fine (and highly flammable) dust throughout the air of the shafts of No. 4. Before the train reached the surface, several cars broke loose and ran back down the slope of No. 4, derailing along the way and hitting a power line, causing it to arc and igniting the coal dust at the 5,500-foot (1,700 m) level (below surface).

The resulting explosion blew coal dust up the slope to the surface where the additional oxygen created a huge blast, which leveled the bankhead on the surface – where the coal is hauled out from the mine in an angled shaft into a vertical building (the coal is then dropped into railway cars). Most of the devastation was sustained by the surface buildings, but many miners were trapped in the shaft along with the derailed train cars and fallen support timbers and other items damaged by the explosion.

Heroically, Drägermen (rescue miners with breathing equipment) and barefaced miners (without such protection) entered the 6,100-foot-deep (1,900 m) No. 4 to aid their colleagues. International media coverage of the 1956 explosion was largely overshadowed by the Soviet invasion of Hungary and the Suez Crisis, which happened at about the same time. Nevertheless, Canadian and local media gave extensive coverage to the 1956 disaster. After the rescue effort, the connected No. 4 and No. 2 collieries were sealed for several months to deprive the fires of oxygen. In January 1957, the bodies of the remaining casualties were recovered from the pit, and No. 4 colliery closed forever. One of the rescuers, physician Arnold Burden, was also involved in the 1958 disaster.

== 1958 bump ==
=== The events ===
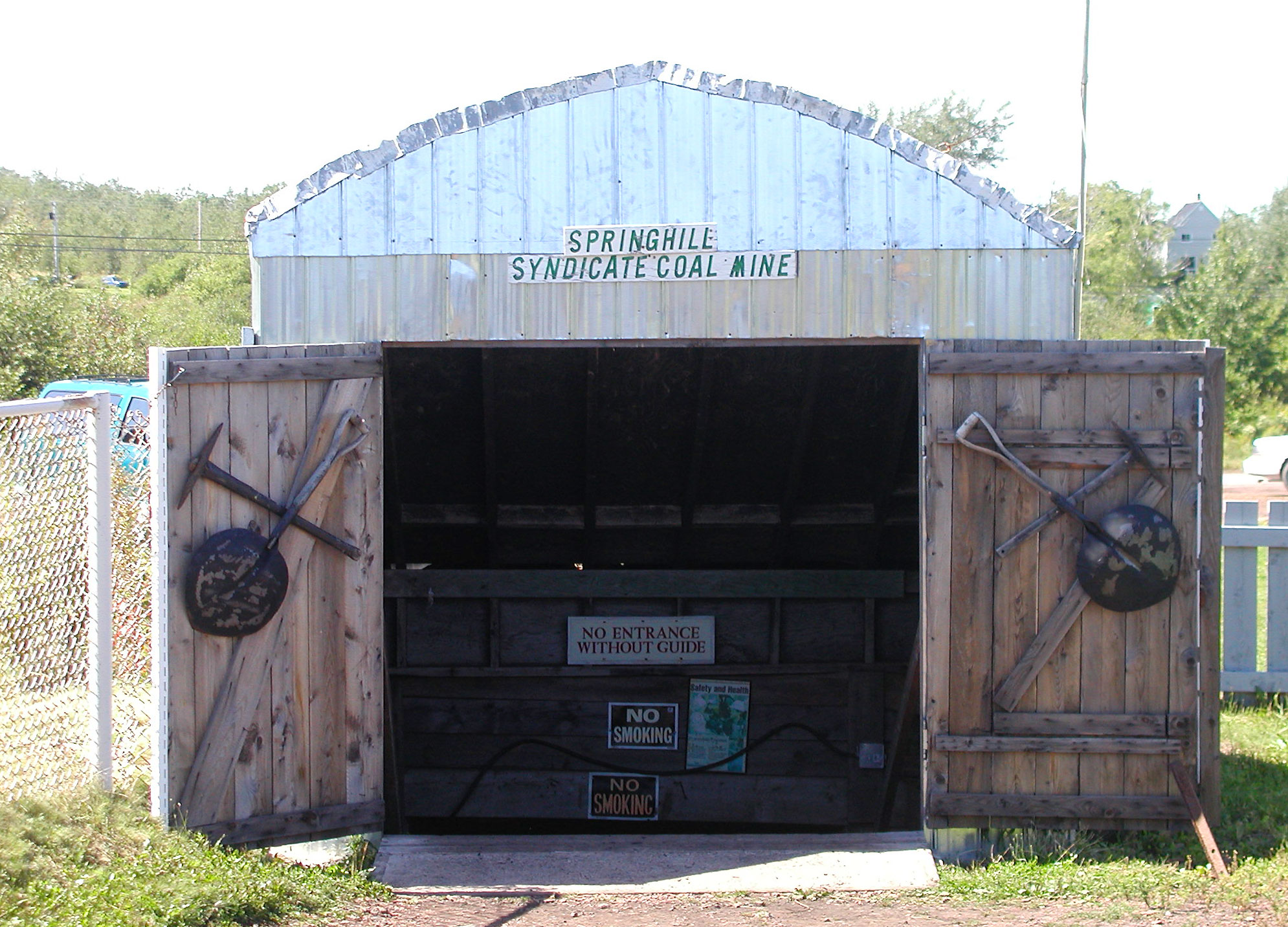
Miner museum entrance in Springhill, NS.

The 1958 bump killed 75 miners on October 23, 1958, out of 174 working at the No. 2 colliery. The accident was the most severe "bump" (underground seismic event) in North American mining history, injured Springhill residents, and devastated the town's economy.

Springhill's No. 2 colliery was one of the deepest coal mines in the world. Sloping shafts 14,200 feet (4,300 m) in length led to a vast labyrinth of galleries more than 4,000 feet (1,200 m) below the surface. Mining techniques there had been changed 20 years before the 1958 bump, from "room and pillar" to "long wall retreating" after reports had shown the increased danger of "bump" phenomena resulting from the former technique.

On October 23 a small bump occurred at 7:00 pm during the evening shift; it was ignored, as this was a somewhat common occurrence. However, just over an hour later, at 8:06 pm, an enormous bump "severely impacted the middle of the three walls that were being mined and the ends of the four levels nearest the walls".

The bump spread as three distinct shock waves, resembling a small earthquake throughout the region, alerting residents on the surface over a wide area to the disaster. "Dräger" teams and teams of barefaced miners entered No. 2 colliery to begin the rescue effort. They encountered survivors at the 13,400-foot (4,100 m) level walking or limping toward the surface. Gas released by the bump was encountered in increasing concentrations at the 13,800-foot (4,200 m) level where the ceiling had collapsed, and rescuers were forced to work down shafts that were in a partial state of collapse or were blocked completely by debris.

Of the 174 miners in No. 2 colliery at the time of the bump, those who were not located either in side galleries, or some other shelter, were immediately crushed, the coal galleries and faces being completely destroyed. However, 75 survivors were on the surface by 4:00 am on October 24, 1958, and rescue teams continued working to find 24 others, but the number of rockfalls and the amount of debris slowed progress.

Meanwhile, the Canadian and international news media had made their way to Springhill. Arnie Patterson was the public relations spokesman for the company, and relayed news of the progress of rescue (and later recovery) to the families of the miners and to reporters. The disaster became famous for being the first major international event to appear in live television broadcasts (on the CBC). As the world waited and those on the surface kept their vigil, rescuers continued to toil below ground trying to reach trapped survivors. Teams began to arrive from other coal mines in Cumberland County, on Cape Breton Island and in Pictou County.

After five and a half days (therefore around the morning of Wednesday, October 29, 1958), contact was established with a group of 12 survivors on the other side of a 160-foot (49 m) rockfall. A rescue tunnel was dug; it broke through to the trapped miners at 2:25 am on Thursday, October 30, 1958.

On Friday, October 31, 1958, the rescue site was visited by various dignitaries, including the Premier of Nova Scotia, Robert Stanfield, and His Royal Highness Prince Philip, the Duke of Edinburgh who had been at meetings in Ottawa.

On Saturday, November 1, 1958, another group of survivors was found. None were found thereafter. Instead, bodies of the dead were hauled out in airtight aluminum coffins, on account of the advanced stage of decomposition, accelerated by the Earth's heat in the depths of No. 2 mine at 13,000–14,000 feet (4,000–4,300 m) below the mine entrance.

=== The aftermath ===
The 1958 bump had profound and long-lasting effects on the town and on the public imagination.

In the media crush at the pithead (the shaft entrance at the surface), reporters rushed to speak with survivors, particularly the two groups of miners who had been trapped until Thursday and Sunday respectively. When asked what he wanted most, survivor Douglas Jewkes replied, "A 7 Up". Following this high-profile media event and unexpected "plug", the 7 Up company hired him as a spokesman.

Several miners and their rescuers were invited onto The Ed Sullivan Show. One miner, Maurice Ruddick, was chosen as Canada's "Citizen of the Year". Ruddick and the other "miracle miners" enjoyed public attention for a brief time after their rescue. For Ruddick, the only black man in the group, racism dimmed his moment in the spotlight. An aide to the Democratic Governor of the U.S. state of Georgia Marvin Griffin took advantage of the intense media coverage to promote tourism to that state by offering a group of survivors free vacations to Jekyll Island. However to the segregationist governor's chagrin (he had been vacationing on a hunting trip in Manitoba at the time of the disaster), he learned of Ruddick's race – which resulted in a public relations nightmare. Upon learning that Ruddick was black, the governor said that Ruddick would have to be segregated. Ruddick agreed to the governor's terms so that the other miners' vacations would not be ruined; but he and his family stayed in a trailer apart from his colleagues. Ruddick died in 1988. In 2003, U.S. author Melissa Fay Greene retold this aspect of the aftermath in her book Last Man Out.

The rescuers were awarded a gold medal by the Royal Canadian Humane Association for bravery in lifesaving, the first time the medal had been awarded to a group. In 1958, the town of Springhill was awarded the Carnegie Medal for Heroism recognizing the community involvement needed to save the surviving miners. As of 2015, Springhill is the only community to have received that award, usually reserved for individual acts of heroism.

=== Representations in popular culture ===
In music

- On November 7, 1958 (a week after the last survivors were rescued from The Bump), bluegrass musician Bill Clifton recorded "Springhill Disaster", a song that he adapted from a poem written by the celebrated survivor, Maurice Ruddick.
- American folksinger Peggy Seeger and English folksinger Ewan MacColl composed the song "The Ballad of Springhill" about the 1958 disaster. It was originally performed by MacColl and Seeger as an a cappella duet in 1959. They sang the song at the 1960 Newport Folk Festival with guitar accompaniment. It was subsequently sung by popular folk revival group Peter, Paul and Mary. In 1987, Irish rock band U2 drew attention to the disaster when they included "The Ballad of Springhill" in the playlist for their Joshua Tree Tour. U2 performed the song at fifteen concerts, and were televised live in 1988. U2's lyrics have sometimes been misheard, with people thinking that Bono sang "late in the year of 88"; when in fact he sang "laid in the earth are 88", referring to the number of those who died (in fact: 75 died in the 1958 bump, but 88 were rescued after the 1956 explosion). On July 30, 2011, U2 performed the first verse of the song during the final show on their 360° Tour in Moncton, New Brunswick. In an interview after the 1987 performance on a 25th anniversary television tribute to the Irish band The Dubliners, Bono said that the first recording of "The Ballad of Springhill" he heard was that by Irish folk singer Luke Kelly, a member of The Dubliners. Peggy Seeger came to Springhill in 2008, where she sang the song on the 50th anniversary of the bump. Other recordings of the song include those by English folk musician Martin Carthy on his 1965 self-titled debut album as “Springhill Mine Disaster”; Irish musician Pauline Scanlon on her début album Red Colour Sun, featuring Damien Dempsey, as "The Springhill Mining Disaster"; and Canadian rapper/producer Socalled on his 2011 album Sleepover.
- Canadian folk group Tanglefoot refer to the 1958 bump in their song "Hard Work" on their 2006 album Dance Like Flames.
- In 2008, Brian Vardigans wrote a song entitled "Springhill" that was sung at the 50th anniversary ceremonies for the victims of the 1958 bump on October 23, 2008.
- In 2023, Adam Baldwin wrote a song entitled "No. 2 Colliery" as part of his album "Concertos and Serenades" which includes ballads about the working man's trials and tribulations on the East Coast.

In literature

- Leonard Lerner's 1960 book Miracle at Springhill is about the 1958 bump.
- Richard Brautigan wrote a poem entitled "The Pill Versus the Springhill Mine Disaster", published in 1968, about the 1958 bump.
- On the CBC Radio show The Vinyl Cafe, host Stuart McLean tells one of his popular "Dave and Morley" fictitious stories from the perspective of Dave's mother and the tale of how Dave's uncle died in the 1958 disaster.
- Alistair MacLeod's short story "The Vastness of the Dark" features the narrator passing through Springhill in 1960, and recalling the disasters and the efforts of his mining community to retrieve the survivors.
- In 2003 Melissa Fay Greene wrote Last Man Out: the Story of the Springhill Mine Disaster, a riveting biographical reconstruction based on survivor interviews.
- A 2014 book by Cheryl McKay, Spirit of Springhill: Miners, Wives, Widows, Rescuers and Their Children Tell True Stories of Springhill's Coal Mining Disasters, relates to the 1956 explosion, to the 1957 Main Street fire, and to the 1958 bump.
- A 2014 fictionalized novel by Cheryl McKay, Song of Springhill – A Love Story: An Inspirational Romance Based on Historical Events relates to the 1958 bump. The character of Isaak Revere in the novel is based on Maurice Ruddick.

In film

- The disaster is indirectly referenced in the Disney 1961 animated film One Hundred and One Dalmatians. After the puppies are stolen, there is an image of a newspaper front page; under the headline "15 puppies are dognapped from home", there is an account of the 1958 bump.
- Ron Kelly's 1972 film Springhill dramatized the disaster, with a cast including Paul Bradley, Sean Sullivan and Ed McNamara. It film faced some controversy, with survivors of the disaster expressing their opposition to having their experiences dramatized for television.

== See also ==
- William Davis Miners' Memorial Day
