= John Leonard MacKean =

Canadian sex offender (1949–2014)

- Born: June 15, 1949
- Died: August 14, 2014 (aged 65); Springhill, Nova Scotia
- Known for: Sexual assaulting a captive 16-year-old boy
- Penalty: 2 years imprisonment; 3 years probation

John Leonard MacKean (June 15, 1949 – August 14, 2014) was a Canadian man convicted of sexually assaulting a kidnapped 16-year-old boy.

== Crime ==
MacKean's crime occurred in September 2012 in Nova Scotia, Canada. A 16-year-old boy was kidnapped by two men after being offered a "painting job". The teenager was then taken to a remote cabin and was blindfolded and chained. MacKean communicated with the two men holding the boy captive and arranged a meeting to use the boy for sexual services.

The boy testified that he was blindfolded and crying while MacKean entered the cabin and performed oral sex on him.

== Conviction ==
MacKean pleaded not guilty to the charges of sexual assault and communicating for the purpose of obtaining sexual services from a person under 18.

In March 2014, MacKean was found guilty of all charges and sentenced to two years imprisonment followed by three years probation.

== Controversy ==
The short sentence of MacKean sparked controversy among Canadians. The sentence triggered an uproar of disbelief from Twitter users.

Crown attorney Lloyd Tancock defended the sentence of MacKean. Tancock said that the penalty for those convicted of "communicating for the purpose of obtaining sexual services from a person under 18" ranges from no jail time to significant prison terms. Because of the wide range, other factors must be considered in the sentencing, saying that it was relatively shorter because MacKean does not have a previous record and he was also only involved in the incident for a brief period of time.
