= Oxford Junction =

Oxford Junction may refer to:

- Oxford Junction, Iowa, a city in Jones County
- Oxford Junction, Nebraska, an unincorporated community in Harlan County
- Oxford Junction, Nova Scotia, a Canadian rural community in Cumberland County
