= Springhill Junction =

Community in Nova Scotia, Canada

Coordinates: 45°41′36.9″N 64°6′46.9″W

Springhill Junction is a rural community in central Cumberland County, Nova Scotia, Canada. It is approximately 4 kilometres (2.5 mi) northwest of Springhill, Nova Scotia.

== History ==
In 1872 the Intercolonial Railway of Canada constructed its Truro, NS-Moncton, NB mainline through the area at the persuasion of the Spring Hill & Parrsborough Coal & Railway Company Ltd., creating a diversion several miles to the south of the preferred route running between Oxford Junction, NS and Amherst, NS.

Springhill Junction in Nova Scotia

The community received its name in 1877 following completion of the Springhill & Parrsboro Railway which ran south to the mining town of Springhill and on to the Bay of Fundy port of Parrsboro. The SP&P changed its name to the Cumberland Railway & Coal Company Ltd. in 1884 and operated under this name through the closure of the coal mines in Springhill in 1958 and the abandonment of the railway line south of Southampton to Parrsboro on June 14, 1958. The railway continued limited services between Southampton, Springhill and Springhill Junction until permission to abandon the remaining line was granted in February 1962. The last of the rails from the Springhill to Springhill Junction line were lifted in 1964.

The Intercolonial Railway in the meantime was operated as part of the Canadian Government Railways after 1915 and was fully merged into the Canadian National Railways (CNR) in 1918.

== Present day ==
Today Springhill Junction remains a siding on CN Rail's Halifax-Montreal mainline and a flag stop for Via Rail's Ocean passenger train. The official name still contains the word "junction", despite the fact that the CR&C was abandoned in 1962, making the community a run-through location on CN's mainline.

== See also ==
- Nova Scotia Trunk 2
