= Cumberland Railway and Coal Company =

Canadian industrial company

Map

The Cumberland Railway and Coal Company is a defunct Canadian industrial company with interests in coal mines in Springhill, Nova Scotia, and a railway that operated from Springhill Junction to Parrsboro.

== Springhill and Parrsboro Coal and Railway Company ==
The General Mining Association (GMA) had been established in 1825 to develop mineral rights in Nova Scotia held by the Duke of York. The lease was abrogated in 1857 after the colonial government of Nova Scotia had released all mineral rights in the colony in 1849. In compensation for this loss of mineral rights, the GMA was permitted to retain certain assets in specific geographic areas. Among those rights was a 4 square mile (10 km^{2}) property on a hill in central Cumberland County.

The lack of transportation prevented mining development at Springhill until 1870 when the construction of the Intercolonial Railway between Truro and Moncton came through the area. This instigated several corporate moves for acquiring mineral rights in the Springhill Coal Field.

Since the Intercolonial Railway's preferred route was the most direct east-west line possible, the Spring Hill and Parrsborough Coal and Railway Company (Limited) was incorporated in 1872 as a mining and railway company to link from a mine at Springhill south to the port of Parrsboro on the Bay of Fundy from which coal could be shipped to destinations in southern Nova Scotia and along the eastern seaboard of North America. The same investors also created the Pugwash and Spring Hill Railway Company, which received a charter to build a line north to the Northumberland Strait port of Pugwash from which coal could be shipped to northern Nova Scotia, Prince Edward Island, eastern New Brunswick and Quebec. Both railway lines were promised a subsidy that year by the provincial government for their construction.

However, the investors were able to reduce the amount of new railway construction required in Cumberland County after they encouraged local politicians to persuade the Intercolonial Railway surveyors to route that railway's main line further south from the direct route between Oxford Junction and Amherst. Thus the line made a diversion of several miles to what came to be named Springhill Junction where the Spring Hill and Parrsoborough Railway would link to the new government-owned railway.

The prospect of the railway connection with the Intercolonial saw the Spring Hill & Parrsborough Coal & Railway Company (Limited) lease several areas of Crown mineral rights outside the GMA holdings in the Springhill area to develop a coal mine. In 1874 the provincial government confirmed an attractive subsidy for constructing the railway: 10,000 acres (40 km^{2}) and $5,000 per mile. In 1875, the company secured financing and began construction with the railway line reaching Parrsboro two years later. The Spring Hill & Parrsborough Railway officially opened on July 1, 1877 and began shipping coal to the port; the first year saw 900 ships loaded in the port. The Pugwash & Spring Hill Railway was never constructed as a result of the construction of the Intercolonial Railway connecting to additional markets; in the 1880s the Intercolonial would build a spur to Pugwash off its Oxford Junction - Stellarton.

In 1878, the Springhill colliery had reached the boundary of the GMA holdings and in 1879 the provincial government revoked the GMA lease and transferred the mineral rights for the property to the Spring Hill and Parrsborough Coal and Railway Company (Limited).

== Cumberland Railway and Coal Company ==
Unfortunately, construction costs for the railway and expansion of the colliery had impacted company finances. Revenues were insufficient to pay interest on company bonds and bankruptcy was declared with the company liquidated in 1883.

The Cumberland Coal and Railway Company was incorporated in 1883 and changed its name to Cumberland Railway and Coal Company in 1884 when it purchased the assets of the Springhill and Parrsborough Coal and Railway Company (Limited). The new CR&C began mining on a much larger scale, opening the No. 1 and No. 2 collieries on the Springhill Coal Field.

The company suffered a devastating loss on February 21, 1891 when a fire ignited accumulated coal dust in both collieries killed 125 miners (see the 1891 Fire under Springhill mining disaster).

Following the fire, coal production resumed on an ever-increasing scale in the Springhill Coal Field, fed by the railway boom across Canada and the economic protection afforded by the National Policy which prevented a flood of cheap American coal into the country.

=== DOMCO and DOSCO ===
In 1910 the Dominion Coal Company Limited (DOMCO) absorbed the Cumberland Railway and Coal Company, maintaining the CR&C as a subsidiary. DOMCO was merged into the British Empire Steel Corporation (BESCO) in the early 1920s, which was later subsumed by the Dominion Steel and Coal Corporation (DOSCO) in 1930. In 1957 DOSCO was acquired by Avro Canada, which became Hawker Siddeley Canada in 1962.

Under DOSCO ownership, the CR&C operated its Springhill mines as efficiently as possible, however by the 1950s, demand for coal was softening as railways dieselized and alternative heating fuels were implemented. DOSCO made few capital investments in the Springhill mines as production was winding down, which is believed to have contributed to two mining tragedies in that decade.

The 1956 Explosion was caused by a runaway mine tram on November 1, 1956 and killed 39 miners. (see 1956 Explosion under Springhill mining disaster) The mines returned to production in January 1957 however few improvements were made, other than what was necessary to begin mining again. Declining export markets for Springhill coal saw the CR&C decide to stop shipments through the port of Parrsboro in the summer of 1958. The last train operated to Parrsboro on June 14.

That fall saw the final chapter in Springhill mining history. The 1958 Bump was caused by the use of "room and pillar" mining techniques up until the late 1930s, creating undue stress on the local geology. Despite using the newer "long wall retreating" method, a devastating bump on October 23, 1958 killed 74 miners when the collieries collapsed.

Following the 1958 Bump, DOSCO never reopened the mine and abandoned all of its mining properties in the Springhill Coal Field, throwing thousands out of work and devastating the economy of central Cumberland County.

The CR&C railway limped on for a few years after the closure of the coal mines. After June 14, 1958, the southern terminus of the railway was in Southampton, to serve blueberry packers there. Scheduled CR&C service was reduced to one daily round trip between Springhill and Springhill Junction. Traffic continued to decline, and permission to commence abandonment of the line was granted in February 1961. The last train ran in 1962, and the last of the tracks were lifted in 1964.

== Foray onto Cape Breton Island ==
DOSCO wasn't quite finished with its CR&C subsidiary. In 1961, DOSCO had the Cumberland Railway (which, like its predecessor the Spring Hill and Parrsborough Railway had a federal railway charter, thus qualifying it for federal railway subsidies) assume the operations of the Sydney and Louisburg Railway on Cape Breton Island. The reason for this change in title was that the S&L had been formed under a provincial charter in 1910, which made it ineligible for federal railway subsidies. Thus the Cumberland Railway name continued until 1968 when its property, along with DOSCO's coal mines, was expropriated by the Canadian federal government to form the Cape Breton Development Corporation (DEVCO). DEVCO in turn created the Devco Railway from the part of former S&L connecting Glace Bay and New Waterford to Sydney; the remaining lines of the former S&L Railway were abandoned.

Even under Devco, for several years the company did business as the Sydney & Louisburg Division of the Cumberland Railway. In 1972, with H.S. Haslam as general manager, the company operated 39 miles of route with offices in Sydney. The road owned at that date 15 diesel locomotives and 1,100 freight cars.

== See also ==
- Robert Gilmour Leckie
- List of defunct Canadian railways
