= Anne Murray Centre =

Biographical museum in Springhill, Nova Scotia

Coordinates: 45.649663°N 64.059789°W

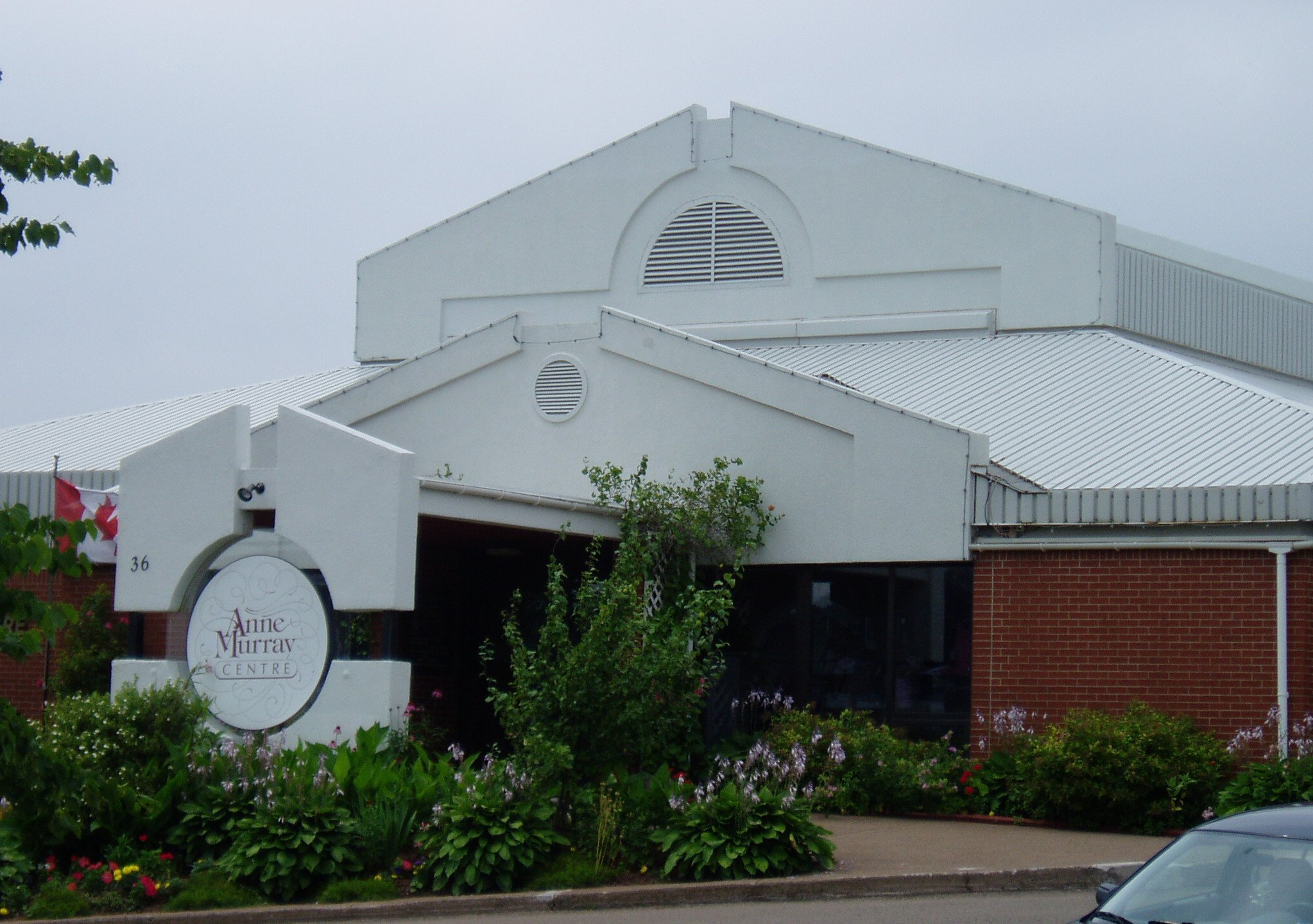
- Established: July 28, 1989
- Location: 36 Main Street, Springhill, Nova Scotia Canada
- Type: Biographical
- Website: annemurraycentre.com/

The Anne Murray Centre is located in Springhill, Nova Scotia exploring the history of the singer, Anne Murray.

The 6,894 square foot building houses exhibits and artifacts, gift shop and multi-use rooms. The centre is opened from mid-May to mid-October and has had 400,000 visitors since July 28, 1989.

== See also ==
- List of music museums
