= No Great Mischief =

1999 novel by Alistair MacLeod

- Author: Alistair MacLeod
- Language: English
- Publisher: McClelland & Stewart
- Publication date: 1999
- Publication place: Canada
- Media type: Print
- Pages: 296
- ISBN: 978-0-7710-5567-6
- OCLC: 42240172
- Dewey Decimal: 813/.54 21
- LC Class: PR9199.3.M3342 N6 1999

No Great Mischief is a 1999 novel by Alistair MacLeod.

== Plot synopsis ==
The novel opens in the present day, with successful orthodontist Alexander MacDonald visiting his elderly older brother Calum in Toronto, Ontario. The novel explores the emotional bonds of family through flashbacks to their childhood in Cape Breton Island and young adulthood spent in the mines of Northern Ontario, clan history dating back to 1779, and present-day interactions between the two brothers and a sister. Though written primarily in English, Scottish Gaelic and French are used in dialogue and songs.

The novel also mirrors Canadian history as a whole, taking its title from James Wolfe's assertion in the Battle of the Plains of Abraham that Scottish soldiers should be sent into battle because "they are hardy, intrepid, accustomed to a rough country, and no great mischief if they fall." The enduring linguistic and cultural tensions that have defined Canadian society are also reflected in the novel; during their time working in the uranium mines of Elliot Lake, the brothers are frequently in conflict with their francophone co-workers.

The novel explores the themes of brotherhood and the conflict between the rise of individualism and family in the post-modern world. Alex loves his alcoholic brother, Calum, despite his problems because Alex sees the potential in Calum. Alex lets his brother die in peace and with dignity even though he is a convicted murderer and alcoholic. The author uses Alex as an example for all human beings. MacLeod wants the reader to realize that "all of us are better when we're loved" and that forgiveness and love for humanity are the only weapons humans have against the destructive forces of evil.

Calum is posited as a contemporary clan chief of the MacDonalds defending the lost cause of Gaelic culture. His defence of Highland values parallels the devastating consequences of the Highland support for Charles Stuart in 1745. Throughout the book, Calum defends clan values in spite of the personal consequences. His distant Californian nephew, who has no idea of these values, steals from the Quebec miners. Calum's defence leads to murder and hard time, while the nephew blithely returns to California. Calum becomes the beaten alcoholic shell of a formerly strong man due to his reflexive support of the old clan values that have long since vanished as guiding principles, even among his own direct family.

The title, "No great mischief if they fall", is found most easily in Findlay, J.T., "Wolfe in Scotland in the '45 and from 1749 to 1753." London: Longmans, Green and Co., 1928, p. 226. An earlier use of the citation that MacLeod used for his title appears in Gibson, John G. "Traditional Gaelic Bagpiping 1745–1945." Montreal and Kingston: MQUP, and Nat. Mus. Scot., 1998, p. 59.

== Awards and nominations ==
- Trillium Book Award, 1999
- Thomas Head Raddall Award, 2000
- Dartmouth Book Award
- Atlantic Provinces Booksellers Choice Award
- International Dublin Literary Award, 2001
- Canadian Booksellers Association Libris Award for Fiction
- In October 2009, Atlantic Canada's 100 Greatest Books selected No Great Mischief as the greatest Atlantic Canadian book of all time.
