= The Lost Salt Gift of Blood =

1976 short story collection by Alistair MacLeod

- First edition cover
- Author: Alistair MacLeod
- Genre: Short story collection
- Publisher: McClelland & Stewart
- Publication date: 1976

The Lost Salt Gift of Blood: New and Selected Stories is a 1976 short story collection by Canadian author Alistair MacLeod. All of the stories contained in the collection were later republished in the book Island, along with the stories from his collection As Birds Bring Forth the Sun and Other Stories.

== Plot ==
According to the book blurb:

The evocative and haunting collection is set Cape Breton Island, Nova Scotia and in Newfoundland, a remote region where Gaelic is still spoken, old legends live on, and the same cold sea that washes the Hebrides beats against the granite cliffs. With a tearing lyricism, The Lost Salt Gift of Blood lays bare the joys, the fears, the darkness, and the shining hope of communities whose isolation is at once a curse and a blessing.

== Stories ==
- "In the Fall"
- "The Vastness of the Dark"
- "The Lost Salt Gift of Blood"
- "The Return"
- "The Golden Gift of Grey"
- "The Boat"
- "The Road to Rankin's Point"

== Style ==
The style of the writing contained in The Lost Salt Gift of Blood is such that the descriptions of the people, their thoughts, fears and eccentricities, as well as the detailed and warm descriptions of the events in the book are the main focus, rather than the events themselves having any complexity.

== Reception ==
A 1994 translation of the book into French by Florence Bernard, titled Cet heritage au gout de sel, won the John Glassco Translation Prize in 1995.
