= Springhill, Nova Scotia =

Springhill
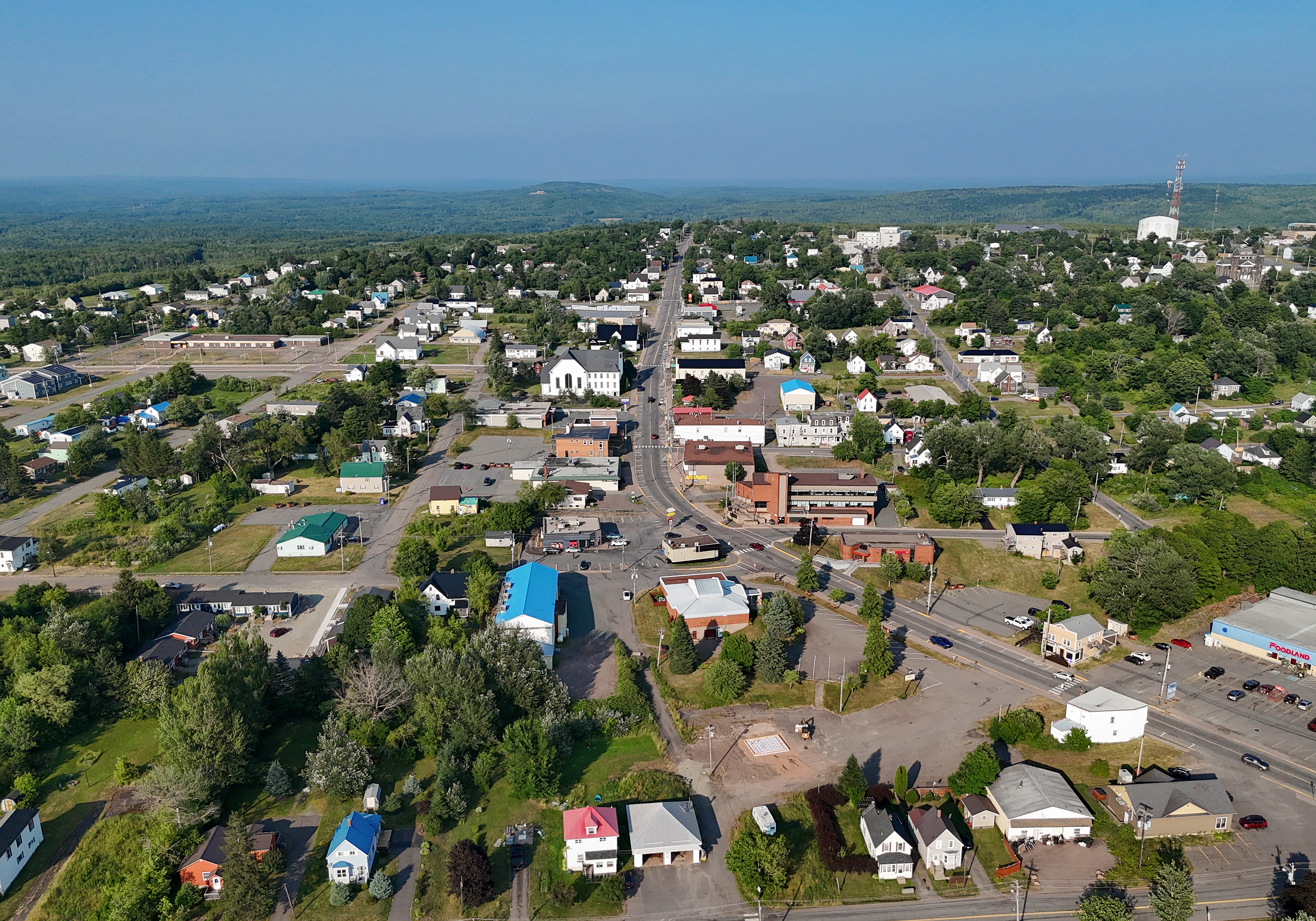
- Aerial view in 2025

- Location of Springhill in Nova Scotia
- Coordinates: 45°40′N 64°4′W
- Country: Canada
- Province: Nova Scotia
- Municipality: Municipality of the County of Cumberland
- Founded: 1790
- Incorporated: March 30, 1889
- Dissolved (merger with county): April 1, 2015
- Electoral Districts Federal: Cumberland—Colchester
- Provincial: Cumberland South

Government
  - Councillors: Scott Lockhart (District 6 Councillor) and Angel McCormick (District 5 Councillor)
  - MLA: Tory Rushton (PC)
  - MP: Stephen Ellis (CPC)

Area
  - Land: 4.84 km^{2} (1.87 sq mi)
- Highest elevation: 183 m (600 ft)
- Lowest elevation: 122 m (400 ft)

Population (2021)
  - Total: 2,654
  - Density: 548.1/km^{2} (1,420/sq mi)
- Time zone: UTC-4 (AST)
  - Summer (DST): UTC-3 (ADT)
- Postal code: B0M
- Area code: 902
- Telephone exchange: 597, 763
- Median Earnings*: $29,037
- NTS Map: 21H9 Springhill
- GNBC Code: CBKDH
- Website: cumberlandcounty.ns.ca
- Median household income, 2000 ($) (all households)

Springhill is a community located in central Cumberland County, Nova Scotia, Canada.

The community was founded as "Springhill Mines". Coal mining led to economic growth, with its incorporation as a town in 1889. The mines in the Springhill coalfield were established in the 19th century, and by the early 1880s were being worked by the Cumberland Coal & Railway Company Ltd. and the Springhill & Parrsboro Coal & Railway Company Ltd. These entities merged in 1884 to form the Cumberland Railway & Coal Company Ltd., which its investors sold in 1910 to the industrial conglomerate Dominion Coal Company Ltd. (DOMCO). All coal mining had ceased in the area by the early 1970s. The community is famous for both the Springhill Mining Disaster and being the childhood home of international recording star Anne Murray, who is honoured by the Anne Murray Centre, a popular tourist attraction.

As of 2015 the mine properties, among the deepest in the world with the No. 2 mine reaching 14,300 feet, are filled with water. They provide Springhill's industrial park with geothermal heating. Geothermal energy from the waters of the abandoned mines is capable of providing heating and cooling for large buildings through the use of heat pumps. Because the water in a mine circulates by convection, shallow wells produce water of a temperature significantly higher than groundwater of the same depth.

In 2015 the Town of Springhill amalgamated into the Municipality of the County of Cumberland.

== Anne Murray Centre ==
The Anne Murray Centre showcases the life of Springhill songstress Anne Murray. The centre displays her early life, rise to fame, and her contributions to music.

Murray was born and raised in Springhill, Nova Scotia. Her father, James Carson Murray, was the Springhill town doctor for many years. Her mother, Marion Margaret Murray, was a registered nurse who focused her life on raising her family and community charity work. The Dr. Carson & Marion Murray Community Centre is named after her parents and is a short distance from the Anne Murray Centre, which hosts an annual summer event and fundraiser that attracts tourists from around the globe.

Her musical accomplishments in pop, country, and adult contemporary music include albums selling over 55 million copies worldwide. Murray has received four Grammys, a record 24 Junos, three American Music Awards, and three Canadian Country Music Association Awards. The Anne Murray Centre in Springhill offers a mini-recording studio to record your own duet, a gift shop, memorabilia and other artifacts spanning the 40 year music career of Anne Murray.

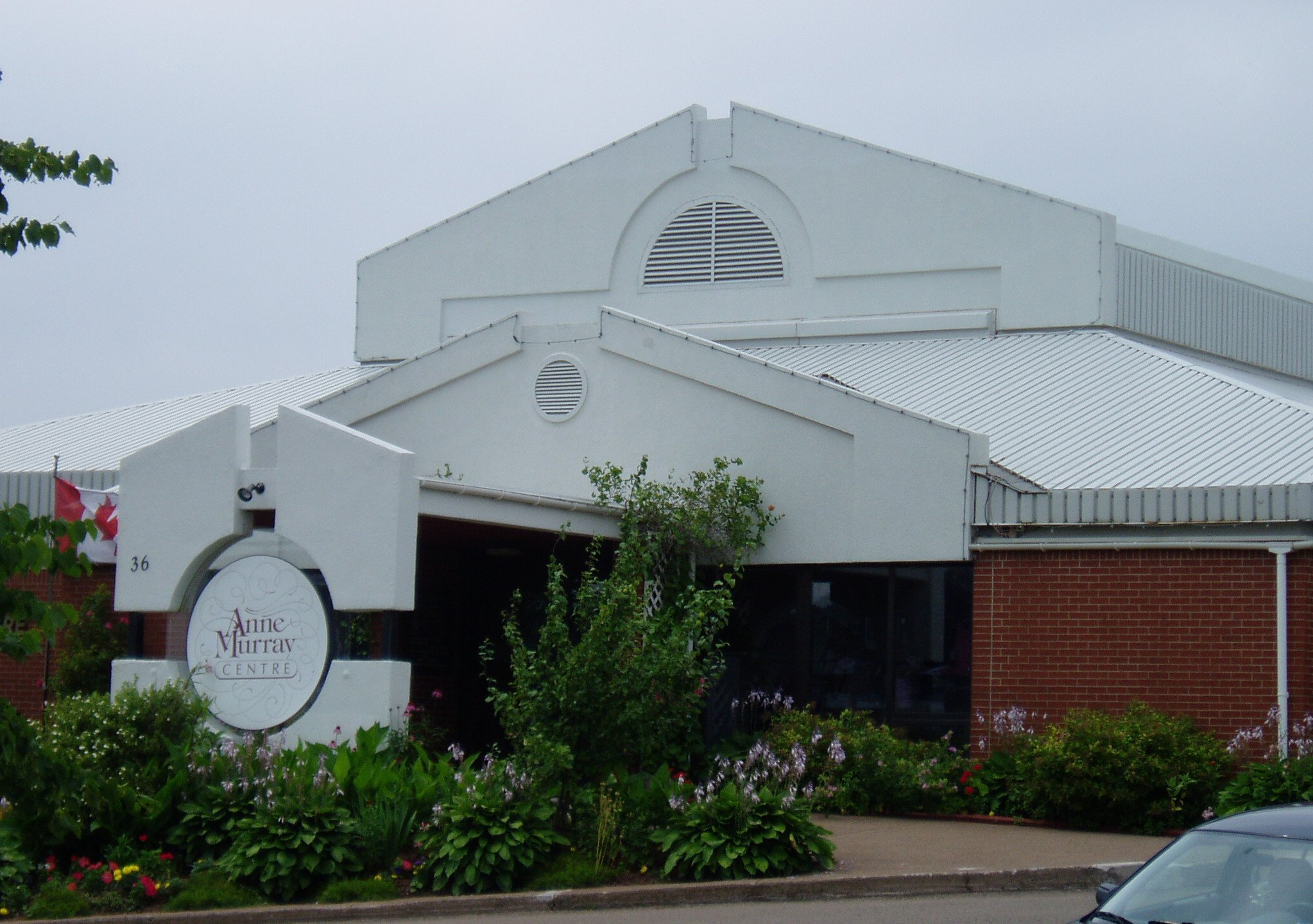
Anne Murray Centre, Springhill, NS.

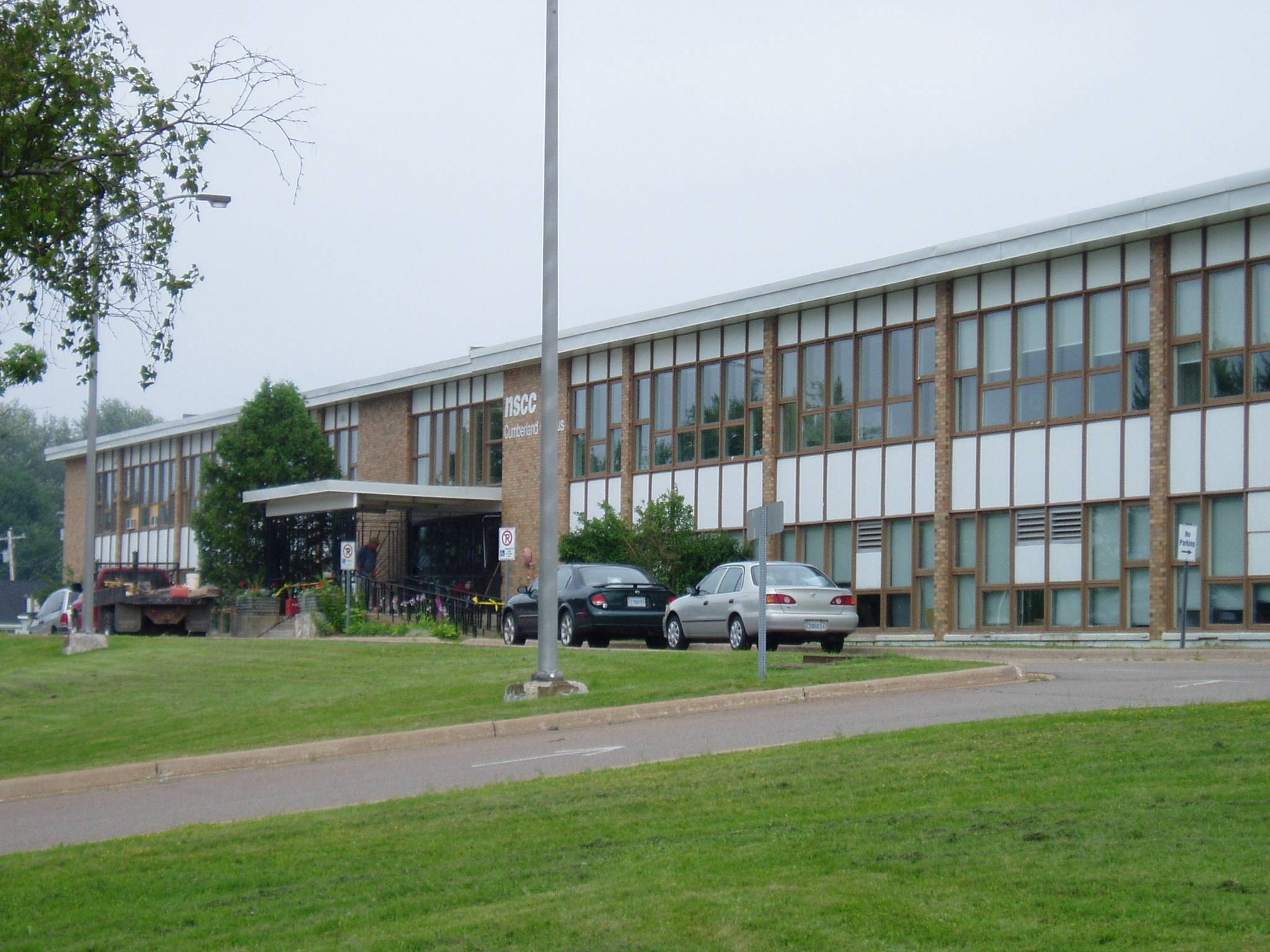
Nova Scotia Community College, Cumberland Campus.

== Landscape and geology ==
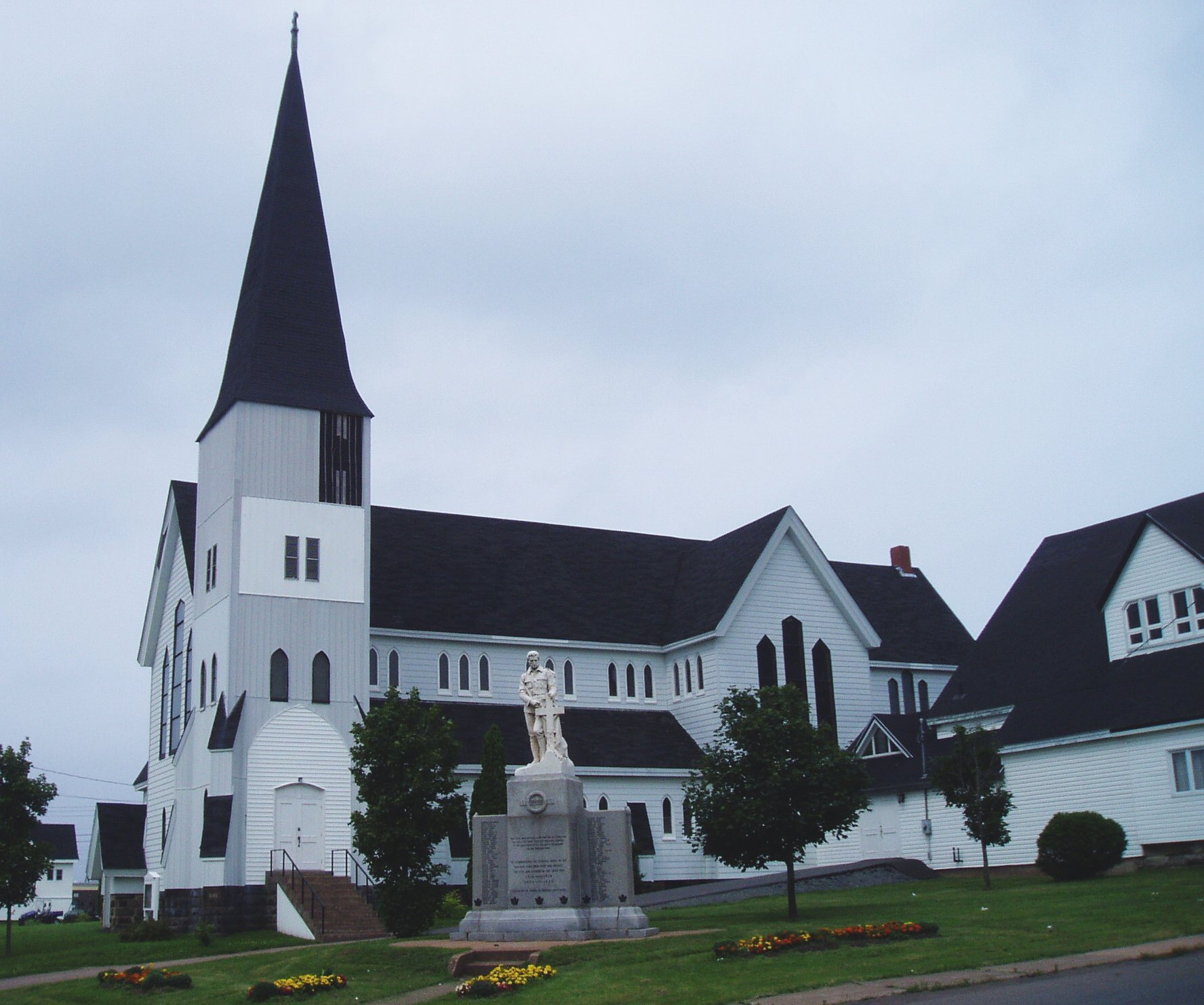
All Saints Anglican Church in Springhill (demolished in 2019). It was designed by William Critchlow Harris.

Springhill is located in the Cobequid Mountains sometimes referred to as the Cobequid Hills, which is a mountain range located in Nova Scotia in the mainland portion of the province. Geologically, the Cobequid Mountains are considered part of the Appalachians. The range stretches from Cape Chignecto in Cumberland County in the west through to Pictou County in the east. As a hamlet protruding from the hillsides of Cumberland County, Springhill lies tucked away in the Nova Scotia interior uplands resting between the smooth summit of the Cobequid Mountains and the Bay of Fundy. This craggy and rugged range is a long, narrow remnant of the Atlantic upland, stretching 75 miles across Cumberland County, from the head of the Bay of Fundy to the Northumberland Strait. When seen from a distance, particularly from a high altitude, the flatness of this mountainous range is notably distinct. Broad, rounded summits, ranging in altitude from 850 to 1,000 feet, merge to form a somewhat rolling surface with an average altitude closer to 900 feet. The undulating terrain of Springhill itself is located at approximately 650 feet above sea level and occupies a total land area of only 4 square miles. The hillside terrain has divergent elevations from 400 to 650 feet with discrete panoramic views of the historic lowlands sheltered by towering pines and stands of birch.

Springhill is located on the northwestern edge of the Cobequid Hills midway between the Minas Basin and the Northumberland Strait. Located in the carboniferous area on the southern side of the Cumberland Coal Basin, Springhill's six main coal seams overlap. The seams, separated by strata of sandstone and shale from 11–110 metres in thickness, were once horizontal, but, because they were raised by internal earth movement, now slope sharply down into the earth. The seams dip to the northwest at an angle of thirty-five degrees.

Historical population
Year	Pop.	±%
1881	900	—
1891	4,813	+434.8%
1896	4,901	+1.8%
1901	4,559	−7.0%
1911	5,713	+25.3%
1921	5,618	−1.7%
1931	6,355	+13.1%
1941	7,170	+12.8%
1951	7,138	−0.4%
1956	7,348	+2.9%
1961	5,834	−20.6%
1981	4,896	−16.1%
1986	4,712	−3.8%
1991	4,373	−7.2%
1996	4,193	−4.1%
2001	4,091	−2.4%
2006	3,941	−3.7%
2011	3,868	−1.9%
2016	2,743	−29.1%
2021	2,654	−3.2%

== Coal mining history and legacy ==
The first industrial coal mining in the area took place in the 1870s after a rail connection was built by the Springhill and Parrsboro Coal and Railway Company to the newly completed Intercolonial Railway at neighbouring Springhill Junction. Early growth of the coal industry in Nova Scotia was built on exports to the east coast of the United States.

Coal was so prevalent in Springhill that "there was a time when men got coal out of their backyards; shallow pits were found everywhere. In recent years, there have been instances when a homeowner would step out of his door only to find a big gaping hole where his driveway had been. Another part of an old mine had caved in."

Springhill mining disaster may refer to any of three Canadian mining disasters that occurred in 1891, 1956, and 1958 in different mines within the Springhill coalfield, near the town of Springhill in Cumberland County, Nova Scotia. The third and final disaster in 1958 accelerated the closure of the largest mines when what was known as a "bump" occurred. The underground upheaval can be described as a bump due to a seismic jolt stemming from the collapse of one or more support pillars within a mine.

A commemorative monument is prominently displayed on the main street of Springhill to honour the heroic lives of miners and their families. The statue is near to Miner's Hall, on the corner of Main and Pioneer Street. A short drive from downtown is the Springhill Coal Mining National Historic Site of Canada. This site is located at the corner of Industrial Park Drive and Memorial Crescent, Springhill, Nova Scotia, Canada. Visitor's have an opportunity to tour the depths of a Springhill coal mine, hear stories of the disaster of 1891, the 1916 subterranean fire which raged through the galleries, the loss of 39 men in the 1956 explosion and the major “bump” in 1958 which killed 75 men. The Canadian Broadcasting Corporation who owned CBHT pioneered outside broadcasting in Canada with its coverage of the Springhill Mine Disaster in 1958. The Miners’ Museum displays unique artifacts of the history of the town and its remarkable industrial heritage. There is a gift Shop and picnic area for tourists on the site.

Springhill Mining Disasters are articulated in a number of songs, poems, books and published articles, including an Alistair MacLeod short story entitled, "The Vastness of the Dark". Blue Grass musician Bill Clifton recorded a song in 1958 called the “Springhill Disaster”. The American folksinger Peggy Seeger and English folksinger Ewan MacColl composed the song "The Ballad of Springhill" about the 1958 Springhill Mining Disaster, subsequently sung by popular folk revival group Peter, Paul and Mary.

In 1987, Irish rock band U2 drew attention to the disaster when they included "The Ballad of Springhill" in the playlist for their Joshua Tree Tour. U2 performed the song at fifteen concerts, and were televised live in 1988. On July 30, 2011, U2 performed the first verse of the song during the final show on their 360° Tour in Moncton, New Brunswick.

== Post-industrial adjustment ==
The abrupt end of large-scale industrial coal mining presented incredible economic challenges for the region as residents struggled with massive unemployment in the 1960s. An unexpected legacy and benefit from the abandoned coal mines is being realized in the form of geothermal energy. Since their closure, the mines have filled with ground water which is heated to an average temperature of 18° C (65 °F) by the surrounding earth. Beginning in the late 1980s, this heat source has been exploited by companies located in Springhill's industrial park, situated on the land where the surface facilities of the coal mines were located, reducing winter heating bills substantially.

The provincial and federal government offered economic development assistance and a federal medium-security penitentiary, the Springhill Institution, was built during the late 1960s in an effort to diversify the Springhill economy. Nova Scotia Community College, operates their Cumberland Campus in the community of Springhill and offers academic upgrading, post-secondary education courses and trades training in a number of disciplines. Other companies, such as lead–acid battery manufacturer Surrette Battery and Benjamin Heating Products continue to operate in the community. The Royal Canadian Mounted Police (RCMP) have a detachment in Springhill and serve the surrounding communities. The All Saints Springhill Hospital operated under the Nova Scotia Health Authority provides health services to Springhill and surrounding areas including Oxford, Collingwood, Southampton and Springhill Junction.

== Municipal governance ==
On March 4, 2014, the town's elected council, under the leadership of Mayor Max Snow, announced the decision to give up the municipal incorporation charter for the Town of Springhill effective April 1, 2015. The council stated that the decision was arrived at because the municipality, incorporated in 1889, was facing unprecedented future financial pressures in the form of rising costs for services, salaries and pension obligations, most notably for its municipal police department. At the same time, the municipality was facing a future of decreased revenue due to declining property tax assessments while at the same time having the highest municipal property tax rate in Nova Scotia. Upon dissolution, Springhill became part of the Municipality of the County of Cumberland, comprising approximately 1/5 of the population of that municipality. The decision was criticized by some residents who alleged a lack of consultation by the town council. However, the decision was also supported by other residents as a good choice.

== Springhill Fencebusters baseball ==
Baseball and coal mining can be linked together in Nova Scotia history since the early 1900s. The development of both professional players and colliery leagues in many Nova Scotia communities came from a need for both recreation and a distraction from the hardships of life in a mining town. Baseball reinforced a cohesiveness between young and old and often brought management and laborers together. During the heyday of Nova Scotia baseball, the Famed Springhill “Fencebusters” included many great sporting moments by pioneer players like "Buddy" Condy, Al Linkletter, Edgar “The Great” Cormier, Leo MacDonald and notable pitchers like Phillip Lloyd “Lefty” Legere. This baseball tradition has been carried forward through a living history project and the coaching of Jim “Pokey” Melanson. Following his death, a ball field was named in his honour.

== Cumberland Trail ==
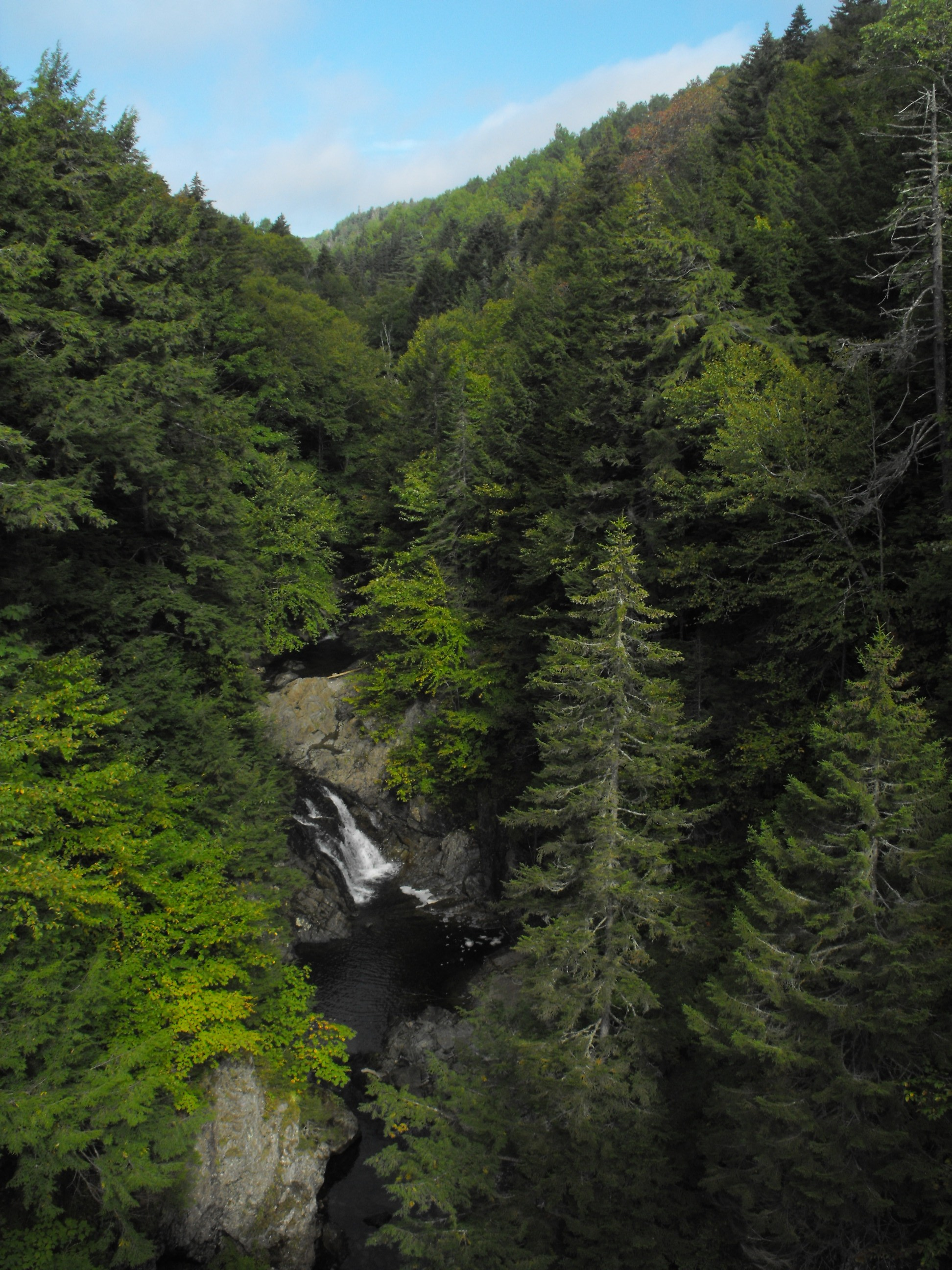
Cobequid Hills (Cobequid Mountains), Cumberland County, Nova Scotia.

“The Great Trail” or Trans-Canada Trail System includes an arm of the Cumberland Trail stretching from “The Junction” at Fisher Road passing northwest of Springhill near Lisgar and Queen Street near Springhill Lion's Park and traveling southwest toward Lagoon Road. This leg of multi-use trail travels southwest toward Parrsboro passing Newville and Gilbert Lakes. Local trails are groomed and maintained for approximately 200 kilometres between the Trans-Canada Highway and Southampton in Winter months and actively used by the Cumberland County Snowmobile Club. The Cobequid Off-Highway Vehicle Club also uses and maintains trails near Springhill, Nova Scotia.

The Springhill Centennial Golf Club is located at 2770 Pleasant Valley Road. Facilities are in operation from May to October. The course offers 9-hole, par 36, 3000 yd., a large driving range, a putting green, as well as a large clubhouse that was originally a farm house.

The Dr. Carson and Marion Murray Community Centre in Springhill has an arena with an NHL sized ice surface and seating capacity of 800. There are five dressing rooms, a room for officials, lobby, storage facilities, canteen with kitchen, coatroom, meeting/boardroom, walking track, 3,100 square foot common room, and a teen centre. The Naz MacDonald Walking Trail is a 1.8 km outdoor walking trail in that circles the park adjacent to the community centre. This fitness trail provides an opportunity to experience the beauty of various species of shrubs and flowers of the park.

== Transportation ==
Springhill is 5 km (3.1 mi) south of the Via Rail station in Springhill Junction. It is a stop on request station along the route of the Ocean which runs between Montreal and Halifax. Springhill is 1 hour and 52 minutes driving distance from the Provincial Capital of Halifax, NS, and approximately 45 minutes from Moncton, New Brunswick. Nearby Amherst is a 20-minute drive and Parrsboro is approximately 35–40 minutes from Springhill along Route 2.

== See also ==
- List of historic places in Cumberland County, Nova Scotia (Springhill Coal Mining National Historic Site of Canada)
