= As Birds Bring Forth the Sun and Other Stories =

Collection of short stories by Canadian author Alistair MacLeod

- First edition (publ. McClelland & Stewart)
- Author: Alistair MacLeod
- Publisher: McClelland & Stewart
- Publication date: May 10, 1986
- ISBN: 978-0-771-05566-9

As Birds Bring Forth the Sun and Other Stories is a collection of short stories by Canadian author Alistair MacLeod set predominantly in Cape Breton Island, Nova Scotia and in Newfoundland. It was originally published in 1986. All of its stories were later republished in Island. Macleod explores how family stories and myths, even though they are fictitious, fold into the present to provide comfort in times of emotional distress. The narrator retells the family history of an ancestor who saves and nurtures back to health an injured puppy on the brink of death, only to be violently killed by the dog's offspring a few years later. The dog, known in the stories as the "grey dog of death", consistently appears at times (in dreams or in visions) in the family's history as an omen of imminent death for a relative. The narrator is reminded of the story as he and his siblings sit in a Toronto hospital at the bedside of their ill father. While none of them mention the story to each other, it is clear to the narrator they are all thinking about it, thinking about how even its mention may signal the death of their father.

== Stories ==
- "The Closing Down of Summer"
- "Winter Dog"
- "To Every Thing There Is a Season"
- "Second Spring"
- "The Tuning of Perfection"
- "As Birds Bring Forth the Sun"
- "Vision"

== Plot summary ==
"As Birds Bring Forth the Sun" is about how a man and his dog generated a family myth. The story starts off in a folk tale setting. There was a man who had saved a puppy's life by taking her in when she was left in a box by a gate. He saved her life a second time by soothing her back to health instead of killing her to end her suffering. She grew very large and so the man called her 'cu mor glas', the big grey dog.(p. 225) She comes into heat, and the man has to find a big enough dog to assist her to breed. She doesn't return home. Over a year later, the man and two of his sons go out fishing and they get caught amidst a storm. The storm makes them take shelter on an island close by. They see the big grey dog and the reunion between master and dog becomes tragic. The big grey dog's grown puppies come and mistake the reunion as an attack and they attack and kill the man. This becomes the legend, myth, or family curse that has been bestowed upon that family. They concluded that it was an evil spell. The descendants are very influenced by the myth of the big grey dog as being a deathly curse. This instils fear in them, which causes their deaths. It ultimately took over their lives and they feared anything bad could happen to them with the thought of the big grey dog. The story transitions to the present, the narrator is remembering the curse as he sits in the hospital room with his adult siblings and his ill father, who is the 6th generation descendant. It's October and the rain is falling, which is the same month and weather conditions that occurred when the man saved the big grey dog's life as a puppy.(224, 228)

== Characters ==
- The names of the characters are not mentioned in the story.
- The man who saved the dog as a puppy
- The man's sons
- The Narrator
- The Narrator's brothers
- The Narrator's father
- Cu mor glas – the big grey dog

== Symbols ==
- The dog as an evil omen
- Gaelic Language – ties to characters identity

== Themes ==
- Identity
- Myths
