= Maurice Ruddick =

Survivor of the 1958 Springhill Nova Scotia Mining Disaster

Maurice A. Ruddick (1912–1988) was an Afro-Canadian miner and a survivor of the 1958 Springhill Mining Disaster, an underground earthquake, or "bump" as the miners call it, in the Springhill mine in Cumberland County, Nova Scotia. He was chosen as Canada's "Citizen of the Year". Ruddick and six others were trapped 4000 feet underground, and were there for nine days. Ruddick cheered his comrades with his singing, and the mother of one of the miners later declared "If it wasn't for Maurice, they'd all have been dead."

The disaster attracted international media attention. The Governor of the State of Georgia, Marvin Griffin (Democratic), invited nineteen of the survivors to vacation at one of his state's luxurious resorts, Jekyll Island, usually reserved for millionaires. This was in the Deep South in the time of Jim Crow laws, i.e. strict segregation between black and white people. When he discovered that one of the miners was black, Griffin said that Ruddick would have to be segregated from the others. When the miners heard this, they were reluctant to accept the offer, but Ruddick agreed to go on the Governor's terms, knowing how much the others really wanted the vacation. Ruddick, his wife, and the four of his twelve children who accompanied him on the trip all stayed in a separate area of the island, in trailers built by Griffin especially for the occasion, and attended separate ceremonies from the white miners.

Maurice Ruddick died in 1988. He is buried in Hillside Cemetery.

His daughter, folk singer Val MacDonald, recorded a song that he composed in the mine, "The Springhill Mine Disaster Song."

He was featured in a Canadian Heritage Minute.

A musical written called "Beneath Springhill: The Maurice Ruddick Story" by Beau Dixon with Lyrics and Music by Rob Fortin and Susan Newman was created and played at the 1000 Islands Playhouse in Gananoque, Ontario Canada.

== See also ==
- Black Nova Scotians
