= Alistair MacLeod =

Canadian writer and academic (1936–2014)

Alistair MacLeod OC ONS FRSC
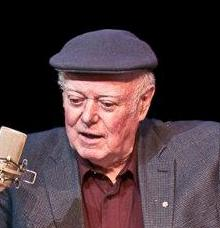
- MacLeod at Cape Breton University in 2012
- Born: July 20, 1936; North Battleford, Saskatchewan, Canada
- Died: April 20, 2014 (aged 77); Windsor, Ontario, Canada
- Education: St. Francis Xavier University, University of Notre Dame
- Occupations: Novelist, short story writer, professor
- Children: Seven, including: Alexander MacLeod
- Writing career
- Notable works: No Great Mischief, The Lost Salt Gift of Blood, As Birds Bring Forth the Sun and Other Stories

Alistair MacLeod (July 20, 1936 – April 20, 2014) was a Canadian novelist, short story writer and academic. His powerful and moving stories vividly evoke the beauty of Cape Breton Island's rugged landscape and the resilient character of many of its inhabitants, the descendants of Scottish immigrants, who are haunted by ancestral memories and who struggle to reconcile the past and the present. MacLeod has been praised for his verbal precision, his lyric intensity and his use of simple, direct language that seems rooted in an oral tradition.

Although he is known as a master of the short story, MacLeod's 1999 novel No Great Mischief was voted Atlantic Canada's greatest book of all time. The novel also won several literary prizes including the 2001 International Dublin Literary Award.

In 2000, MacLeod's two books of short stories, The Lost Salt Gift of Blood (1976) and As Birds Bring Forth the Sun and Other Stories (1986), were re-published in the volume Island: The Collected Stories. MacLeod compared his fiction writing to playing an accordion. "When I pull it out like this," he explained, "it becomes a novel, and when I compress it like this, it becomes this intense short story."

MacLeod taught English and creative writing for more than three decades at the University of Windsor, but returned every summer to the Cape Breton cabin on the MacLeod homestead where he did much of his writing. In the introduction to a book of essays on his work, editor Irene Guilford concluded: "Alistair MacLeod's birthplace is Canadian, his emotional heartland is Cape Breton, his heritage Scottish, but his writing is of the world."

== Early life and education ==
MacLeod's Scottish ancestors emigrated to Cumberland County, Nova Scotia from the Isle of Eigg in the 1790s. They settled at Cape d'Or on the Bay of Fundy where they appear to have leased farmland. In 1808, the parents with their seven daughters and two sons walked from Cape d'Or to Inverness County, Cape Breton, a distance of 362 kilometres, after hearing they could farm their own land there. An account of the journey, written by MacLeod himself, says the family took their possessions with them, six cows and a horse. He adds there were few roads at the time, so his great-great-great-grandparents followed the shoreline.

MacLeod was born in North Battleford, Saskatchewan. His parents, whose first language was Canadian Gaelic, had migrated to Saskatchewan from Cape Breton to homestead during the Great Depression. The family moved on to Edmonton when MacLeod was five and then to the town of Mercoal, Alberta where his father worked as a coal miner. However, the MacLeods suffered from homesickness and when Alistair was 10, they returned to Cape Breton and the farmhouse in Dunvegan, Inverness County, that his great-grandfather had built in the 1860s.

MacLeod enjoyed attending school and apparently did well there. He told a CBC Radio interviewer that as a student, he liked to read and write, adding, "I was the kind of person who won the English prize in grade twelve." After graduating from high school in 1954, MacLeod moved to Edmonton where he delivered milk for a year from a horse-drawn wagon.

In 1956, MacLeod furthered his education by attending the Nova Scotia Teachers College in Truro and then taught school for a year on Port Hood Island off Cape Breton's west coast. To finance his university education, he worked summers drilling and blasting in mines in British Columbia, the Northwest Territories and, in the uranium mines of northern Ontario. At some point, he also worked at a logging camp on Vancouver Island rising rapidly through the ranks because he was physically able to climb the tallest trees and rig cables to their tops.

Between 1957 and 1960, MacLeod studied at St. Francis Xavier University earning a BA and B.Ed. He then went on to receive his MA in 1961 from the University of New Brunswick. He decided to study for a PhD at the University of Notre Dame in Indiana because Frank O'Malley taught creative writing there. MacLeod said he was used to analyzing the work of other authors, but wanted to start writing himself. That wouldn't have happened, he added, if he had not attended such a "creative, imaginative university."

He wrote his doctoral dissertation on the English novelist Thomas Hardy whom he admired. "I especially liked the idea," he told an interviewer years later, "that his novels were usually about people who lived outdoors and were greatly affected by the forces of nature." MacLeod was awarded his PhD in 1968, the same year he published The Boat in The Massachusetts Review. The story appeared in the 1969 edition of The Best American Short Stories along with ones by Andre Dubus, Bernard Malamud, Joyce Carol Oates and Isaac Bashevis Singer.

== Academic career ==
A specialist in British literature of the 19th century, MacLeod taught English for three years at Indiana University before accepting a post in 1969 at the University of Windsor where he taught English and creative writing for more than three decades. A story published after his death in the student newspaper called him "a dedicated professor, an approachable colleague, and an inspiration to young, local writers." It quoted Marty Gervais, one of his university colleagues, as saying that the door to MacLeod's cluttered office was always open to students, faculty and even members of the public. "It didn't matter whether you were a good writer or a bad writer; he was open to talking with you, he would read your work, he would be honest with you, and he would be encouraging as well," Gervais added. "He could talk your ear off with stories...but he was also a good listener."

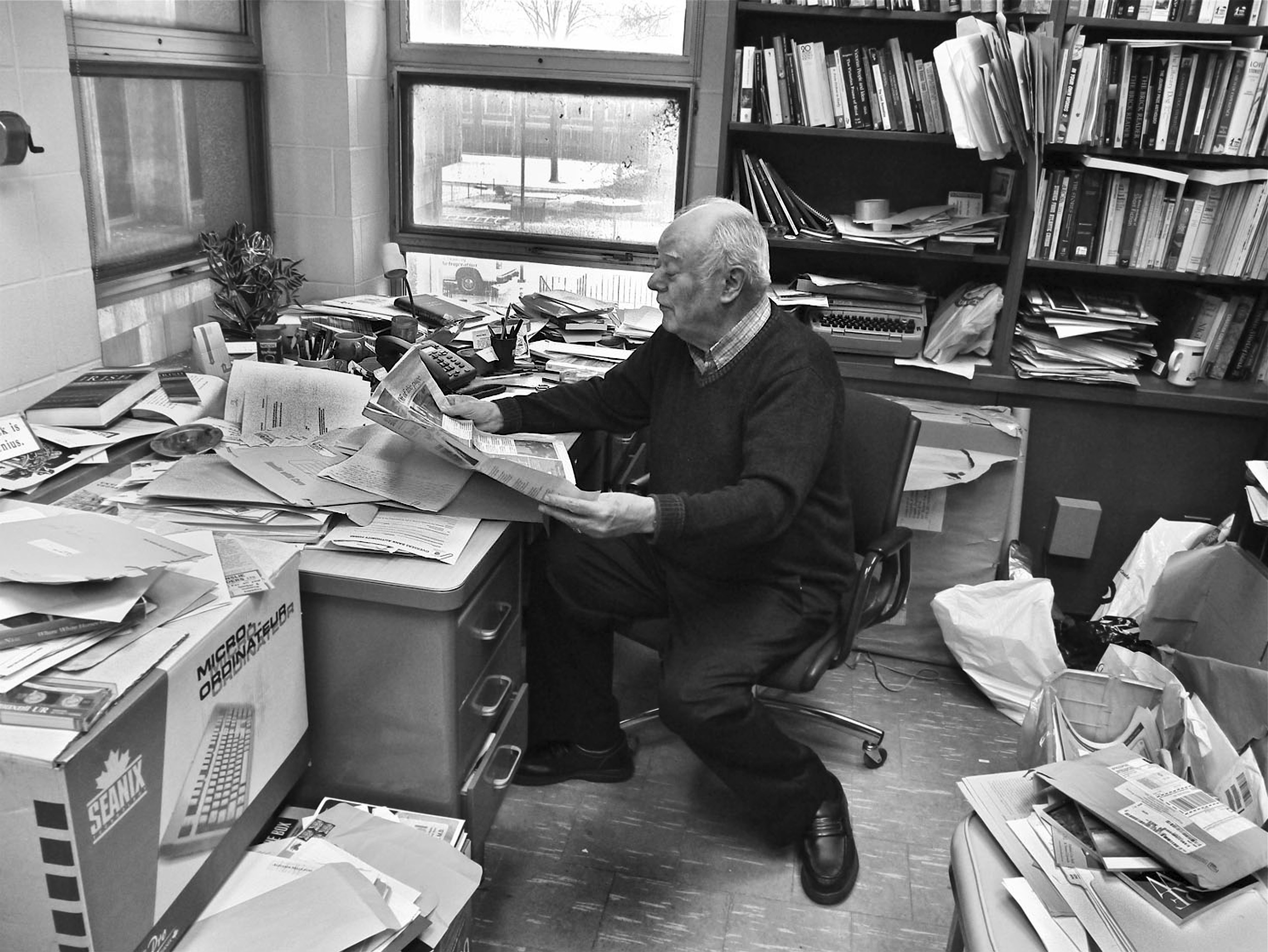
MacLeod in his university office, 2013

Alan Cumyn, who studied creative writing at the University of Windsor, remembered MacLeod as a teacher who placed great emphasis on the fundamentals of good writing such as language and metaphor, character and conflict, narrative structure and form. He wrote that MacLeod read student work carefully and always began his critiques by pointing to the best things about a story before turning to its weaknesses. "By the end," Cumyn wrote, "a story might seem in tatters, but in the oddly inspiring way that gifted teachers and editors have, issues and directions were made much clearer, and many of us felt more confident and enthusiastic about our work than we had going in."

Another student, who attended an intensive writing workshop in Toronto, wrote that if something bothered MacLeod about a student story, he would simply say, "I have a question about that, but not a big one." If he noticed a glaring inconsistency, MacLeod would say, "Some words and phrases startle me." When a student asked how long a good short story should be, "MacLeod clasped his hands and looked up toward the ceiling as if in prayer, then responded in a lyrical Cape Breton accent. 'Well then. Well then. Just make your story as long as a piece of string, and it will work out just fine.'"

MacLeod found that his university duties left little time for creative writing. "One time correcting all my papers and putting circles around their and there and they're," he told a radio interviewer, "I began to think that maybe this wasn't the most worthwhile thing I should be doing with my life and so I said...I'm going to try to write like imaginatively or creatively for two hours a day." The experiment failed, however, because MacLeod found that by the end of each day, he was too worn out from his academic work to produce stories that were any good. So, he did most of his writing during the summer breaks when his family lived on the MacLeod homestead at Dunvegan, Cape Breton. He would spend mornings there "writing in a cliff-top cabin looking west towards Prince Edward Island."

== Published works and methods ==
MacLeod published only one novel and fewer than 20 short stories during his lifetime. Writing in longhand, he worked slowly refining his sentences until he found what he felt were just the right words. "I write a single sentence at a time," he once told an interviewer, "and then I read it aloud."

I think we should realize that "story" is much older than literacy, and that all kinds of people tell stories who can't read and write. But I think that as a writer, I like to give the impression that I am telling the story rather than writing the story.

– Alistair MacLeod

Fellow Cape Breton writer Frank Macdonald described MacLeod as a perfectionist. "He wouldn't set a story free," Macdonald said, "until he was convinced that it was ready." He added that MacLeod never rewrote a story. "He wrote a sentence, and then waited, then wrote another sentence." During a CBC Radio interview in 2011, MacLeod spoke about how he shaped his work. He explained that halfway through a story, he would write the final sentence. "I think of that as the last thing I'm going to say to the reader," he said. "I write it down and it serves as a lighthouse on the rest of my journey through the story."

MacLeod's published works include the 1976 short story collection The Lost Salt Gift of Blood and the 1986 As Birds Bring Forth the Sun and Other Stories. The 14 stories in these two volumes appear in Island: The Collected Short Stories of Alistair MacLeod. The book, which also contains two new stories, was released in 2000 the year after the publication of his successful first novel No Great Mischief. When asked why, as a master short story writer, he had suddenly turned to the novel, MacLeod smiled and replied: "Well, nothing I do is very sudden. I think I just wanted more space. I needed a bus rather than a Volkswagen to put my people in."

In 2004, MacLeod published an illustrated edition of his story, "To Everything There Is a Season" with the new heading of "A Cape Breton Christmas Story".

In October 2012, Remembrance, a story commissioned by the Vancouver Writers Fest to mark its 25 anniversary, was published and sold there as a chapbook.

MacLeod's books have been translated into 17 languages.

== Critical reaction ==
=== Short stories ===
MacLeod's short stories have generated much critical acclaim, especially from Canadian reviewers. In her review of Island, for example, Frances Itani calls the book of collected stories about miners, fishermen and Scottish Highlanders who came to Cape Breton "simply stunning." She also praises the stories for their emotional impact. "Whether you are reading his stories for the first or for the eighth time, they will make you wonder and they will make you weep. The quality of the writing matches the very best in the world." Itani describes "The Boat", MacLeod's first published story (1968), as possibly the most moving and powerful in Canadian literature. For her, all of the stories show a master craftsman at work. "Every story is expertly paced. The internal rhythm has been so perfected, the stories appear to unfold by themselves. There are no tricks; there is no visible or superimposed planning or plotting. Events unfold as unpredictably as life itself." The essayist Joshua Bodwell wrote about discovering MacLeod while travelling in Cape Breton just months before his first child was born, and then later reading "The Boat" aloud to her near her tenth birthday in his piece "The Great Salt Gift of Alistair MacLeod's 'The Boat'."

The English literary critic, James Wood, on the other hand, criticized what he saw as "a certain simplicity, even sentimentalism" in many of the stories in Island. He also found some of them overly melodramatic, adding: "Several of MacLeod's stories have a quality of emotional genre-painting, and display a willingness to let the complexities of character die into stereotype. The men are white-haired and silent, the women dark-haired with sharp tongues." Although Wood conceded MacLeod's status as a writer, he pointed to certain flaws. "MacLeod is a distinguished writer, but his strengths are inseparable from his weaknesses: the sincerity that produces his sentimentality also stirs his work to a beautifully aroused plainness." Wood singles out one story, "The Tuning of Perfection", however, for its "complete lack of sentimentality." He writes that by delicately retrieving the past, MacLeod achieves a fineness removed from much contemporary North American fiction. He concludes that in this story, MacLeod "becomes only himself, provokingly singular and rare, an island of richness."

=== Novel ===
MacLeod's 1999 novel, No Great Mischief, tells the story of the red-haired and dark-eyed MacDonald clan from 1779, when they left Scotland to settle in Cape Breton, to more recent times. The judges, who awarded MacLeod the International IMPAC Dublin Literary Award in 2001, described the novel as "a story of families and of the ties that bind us to them. It is also a story of exile and of the ties that bind us, generations later, to the land from which our ancestors came." They went on to predict that the quality of MacLeod's writing would soon make his name a household word: "The music of the Cape Breton rings throughout this book, by turns joyful and sad but always haunting. Written in a hypnotic, stately prose where every word is perfectly placed, No Great Mischief, has the same haunting effect, and shows why the master craftsman took more than ten years to write it."

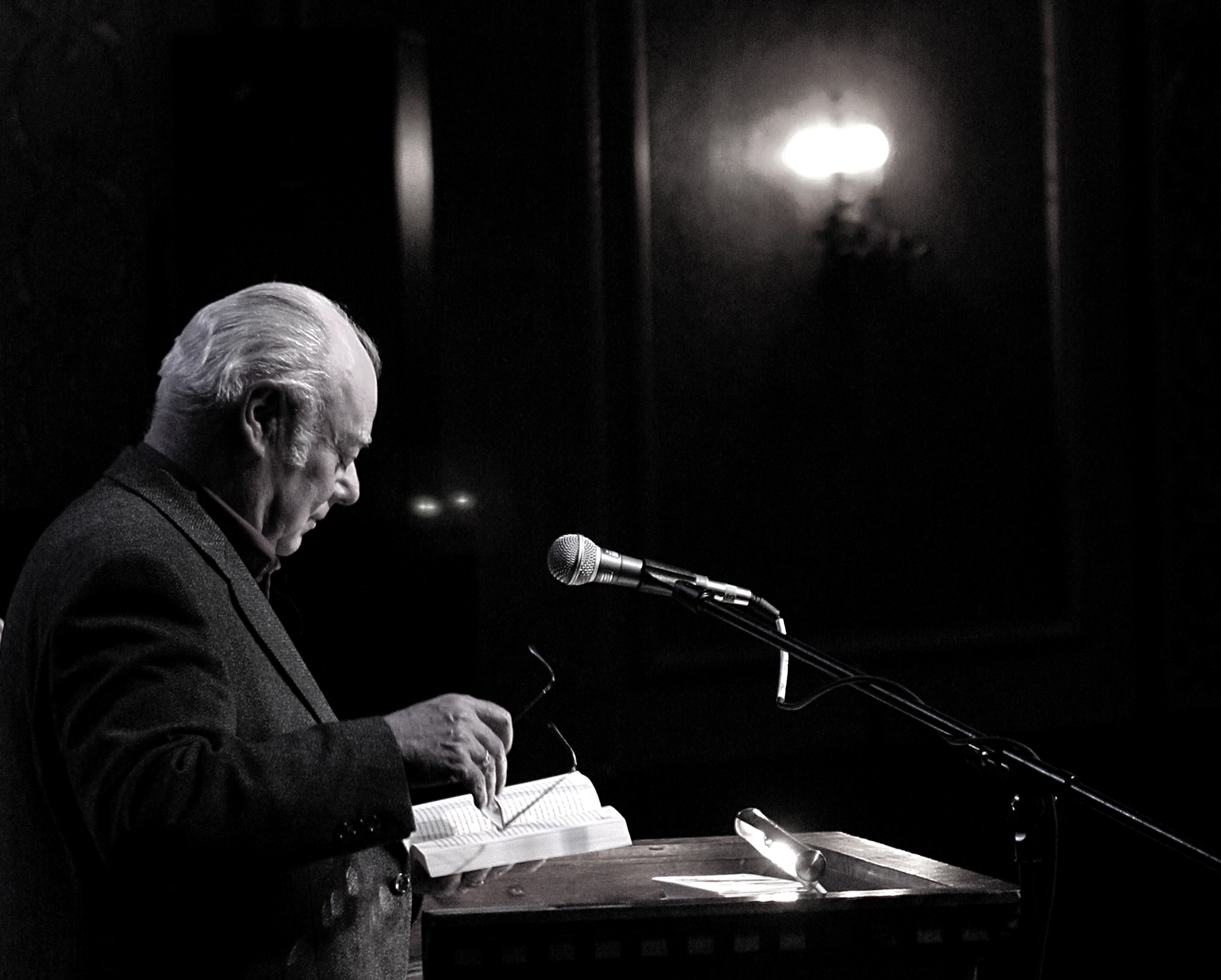
MacLeod reads from his work

Those observations were echoed by many reviewers. In The New York Times, for example, Thomas Mallon praised the book's lyricism and reported that "MacLeod's world of Cape Breton – with its Scottish fishermen and their displaced heirs, the miners and young professionals it has mournfully sent to the rest of the nation – has become a permanent part of my own inner library." Mallon's main criticism was that parts of the novel came across as heavy-handed, lacking the deftness of MacLeod's short fiction. He ended, however, by noting that MacLeod's entire body of work would soon be published in the U.S., granting American readers "a new land that their imaginations can seize like a manifest destiny."

In the British newspaper The Observer, Stephanie Merritt pointed out that when it was first published, No Great Mischief drew "unqualified praise" from the critics. Her review of the paperback edition concluded: "In its poetic and emotional range, this is one of the richest novels of recent years."

The Globe and Mail's critic Kenneth J. Harvey heaped praise on both the book and its author: "The book has it all: beauty, tragedy, grittiness, humour, darkness, love, music, raunchiness, poetry and a glut of fully drawn, extraordinary characters whose words and deeds and circumstances compel the reader to laugh and blush and weep and swell with big-hearted pride.... MacLeod is MacLeod, the greatest living Canadian writer and one of the most distinguished writers in the world. No Great Mischief is the book of the year – and of this decade. It is a once-in-a-lifetime masterpiece."

== Scholarly studies ==
MacLeod's fiction has been studied extensively by postgraduate students. Their master's and doctoral theses explore many aspects of his work, including issues concerning regional and ethnic identity, the influence of island boundaries, magical thinking and the traditional roles of men and women. MacLeod's work has been compared and, in some cases, contrasted with other Canadian authors such as David Adams Richards, Alden Nowlan, Wayne Johnston, Margaret Laurence, Hugh MacLennan and Ann-Marie MacDonald.

== Family ==
MacLeod was married for nearly 43 years to the former Anita MacLellan. She grew up in a house on Cape Breton Island that was just a couple of miles from his. They were married on September 4, 1971. They had seven children: six sons and a daughter, with one son dying in infancy. Their oldest son, Alexander MacLeod, is also a writer, whose debut short story collection Light Lifting was a Scotiabank Giller Prize finalist in 2010.

== Death ==
MacLeod died on April 20, 2014, after suffering a stroke in January 2014. He was 77. His Requiem Mass was held at St. Margaret of Scotland Catholic Church, in Broad Cove, near his home in Dunvegan. He was laid to rest in the nearby graveyard where generations of MacLeods are buried.

== Film about MacLeod ==
He was the subject of a documentary film by the National Film Board, Reading Alistair MacLeod, released in 2005. The 88-minute film, directed by Bill MacGillivray, includes interviews with MacLeod, his wife Anita and other family members. Prominent writers such as Russell Banks, Colm Tóibín and David Adams Richards read from and comment on MacLeod's writing. The film also features excerpts from composer Christopher Donison's opera Island based on one of MacLeod's short stories.

== Awards and honours ==
Macleod's 1999 novel No Great Mischief won several awards including the International Dublin Literary Award, the Trillium Book Award, the Thomas Head Raddall Award, the Dartmouth Book & Writing Award for Fiction, the Canadian Booksellers Association Libris Awards for author of the year as well as fiction book of the year (2000) and the Atlantic Provinces Booksellers' Choice Award. In 2009, No Great Mischief was voted Atlantic Canada's greatest book.

MacLeod won the Portia White Prize in 2001. The prize, awarded by the province of Nova Scotia, honours artistic excellence and achievement.

In 2003, he won the Lannan Literary Award for fiction.

In 2008, MacLeod was named an Officer of the Order of Canada, the same year he became a Fellow of the Royal Society of Canada.

In 2009, MacLeod received the PEN/Malamud Award for Short Fiction along with Amy Hempel.

In 2015, MacLeod was awarded the Order of Nova Scotia.

MacLeod has been awarded more than a dozen honorary degrees including ones from his alma mater, St. Francis Xavier University, Cape Breton University, McGill University and the University of Prince Edward Island.
