= Oxford Junction, Nova Scotia =

Community in Nova Scotia, Canada

Coordinates: 45°42′26.56″N 63°53′11.50″W

Oxford Junction is a Canadian rural community in Cumberland County, Nova Scotia, which lies approximately 5 kilometers to the southwest of the town of Oxford.

Oxford Junction received its name from its railway heritage. The Intercolonial Railway of Canada built its Halifax-Montreal mainline through the area in the early 1870s. In the late 1880s, the ICR built a line nicknamed the "Short Line" along the Northumberland Strait shore of Nova Scotia from Oxford Junction to Stellarton but it was abandoned in 1986.

Many of the homes built in the early 1900s still stand to this day, and several are still in use.
