= List of tallest buildings in Halifax =

Tall buildings in Halifax
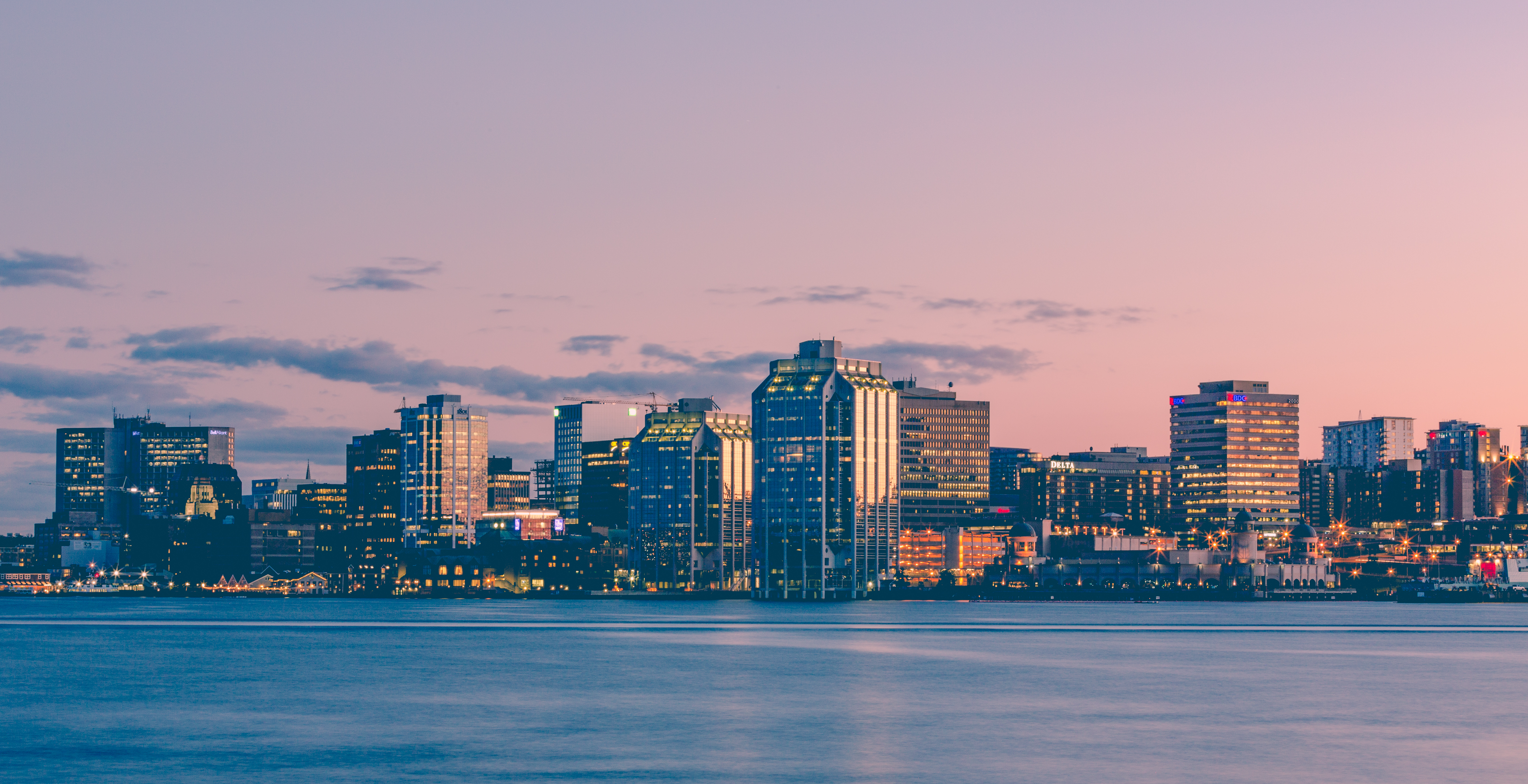
- Downtown Halifax in 2015
- Tallest building: One 77 (2025)
- Tallest building height: 111 m (364 ft)

Number of tall buildings
- Taller than 100 m (328 ft): 3 (2025)

This list of tallest buildings in Halifax ranks the tallest buildings in Halifax, Nova Scotia by height. Halifax is the capital and largest city of Nova Scotia, a Canadian province in Atlantic Canada. With an estimated population of 439,819 in 2021, it is the most populous city in Atlantic Canada.

The tallest building in Halifax is One 77, which topped out in 2023 and was completed in 2025. It is 34 storeys tall and reaches 111 m (364 ft) in height. It supplanted the previous 52-year record-holder, The Vüze, which is 33 storeys and 106 m (348 ft) in height. One 77 is part of a recent residential high-rise boom in the city, beginning in the late 2010's. Besides Downtown Halifax, this boom has also seen the growth of new high-rise buildings in the community of Dartmouth. Dartmouth received a new tallest building in 2026, with the completion of The Angus, a 27-storey, 88 m (289 ft) residential high-rise. According to the now-defunct website Emporis, the municipality contained 105 high-rise buildings over 35 m (115 ft) tall in 2022.

== Tallest buildings ==
This list ranks buildings in Halifax that stand at least 60 m (197 ft) tall, based on CTBUH height measurement standards. This includes spires and architectural details but does not include antenna masts. An equal sign (=) following a rank indicates the same height between two or more buildings.

| Rank | Building | Image | Height | Storeys | Year | Notes | Ref |
|---|---|---|---|---|---|---|---|
| 1 | One 77 (7177 Quinpool Road) | One 77 Quinpool Road in Halifax on March 16, 2024 | 111 m (364 ft) | 34 | 2025 | Tallest building in Atlantic Canada. | |
| 2 | The Vüze | | 106 m (348 ft) | 33 | 1971 | | |
| 3 | Richmond Yards (Building A) | | 103.3 m (339 ft) | 30 | 2024 | | |
| 4 | The Angus | | 88 m (289 ft) | 27 | 2026 | Tallest building in Dartmouth. | |
| 5 | Purdy's Wharf Tower 2 | | 87.8 m (288 ft) | 22 | 1990 | Tallest office building in Halifax. | |
| 6 | The Alexander | The Alexander | 87.1 m (286 ft) | 24 | 2018 | | |
| 7 | 1801 Hollis Street | | 86.6 m (284 ft) | 22 | 1985 | | |
| 8 | Barrington Tower | | 83.8 m (275 ft) | 20 | 1971 | | |
| 9 | TD Centre | | 83 m (272 ft) | 21 | 1977 | Building height raised from 73 m (239.5 ft) to 83 m (272.3 ft) in 2014. | |
| 10 | The Kevel | | 82.5 m (270 ft) | 27 | 2025 | | |
| 11 | The Roy | | 79.9 m (262 ft) | 22 | 2019 | | |
| 12 | Cogswell Tower | | 78.9 m (259 ft) | 20 | 1975 | | |
| 13= | Maritime Centre | | 78 m (256 ft) | 21 | 1977 | | |
| 13= | Parkland at the Common | | 78 m (256 ft) | 25 | 2025 | | |
| 15 | Summer Gardens | | 76.2 m (250 ft) | 21 | 1990 | | |
| 16= | Icon Bay | | 75 m (246 ft) | 22 | 2017 | | |
| 16= | Queen Square | | 75 m (246 ft) | 19 | 1975 | Tallest building in the Dartmouth neighbourhood of Halifax from 1975-2024 | |
| 18 | Purdy's Wharf Tower 1 | | 73.8 m (242 ft) | 18 | 1985 | | |
| 19 | 5151 George Street | | 72.9 m (239 ft) | 18 | 1971 | | |
| 20 | West22 | | 72.7 m (239 ft) | 22 | 2023 | | |
| 21 | The Maple | | 72.5 m (238 ft) | 22 | 2017 | Building height measured from Hollis Street main entrance to mechanical penthouse roof | |
| 22 | Duke Tower | | 71 m (233 ft) | 16 | 1970 | | |
| 23= | Tupper Building | | 70 m (233 ft) | 16 | 1967 | | |
| 23= | Park Victoria | | 70 m (233 ft) | 21 | 1969 | | |
| 23= | Summer Gardens | | 70 m (233 ft) | 21 | 1990 | | |
| 26 | Loyola Residence Tower | | 67.1 m (220 ft) | 22 | 1971 | Residence building of Saint Mary's University. | |
| 27 | Metropolitan Place | | 66.5 m (218 ft) | 16 | 1987 | | |
| 28 | CIBC Building | | 65.5 m (215 ft) | 16 | 1977 | | |
| 29 | Nova Centre (South Tower) | | 65 m (213 ft) | 15 | 2017 | | |
| 30 | The Trillium | | 64.9 m (213 ft) | 19 | 2011 | | |
| 31 | The Trinity | | 64 metres (210 ft) | 21 | 2024 | | |
| 32 | The Elevation on Robie | | 63 m (207 ft) | 19 | 2024 | | |
| 33 | Founders Square | | 60 m (200 ft) | 15 | 1986 | | |

== Tallest under construction and proposed ==
=== Under construction ===
| Building | Address | Location | Year proposed | Height m (ft) | Storeys | Site area | Residential units | Notes | Reference |
|---|---|---|---|---|---|---|---|---|---|
| Promenade Robie South (Tower 1) | College St. | Halifax | 2026 | | 34 | 5,900 m^{2} (64,000 sq ft) | 577 | | |
| Promenade Robie South (Tower 2) | College St. | Halifax | 2026 | | 34 | 5,900 m^{2} (64,000 sq ft) | 577 | | |
| The Post | 53 Queen Street | Dartmouth | | 90 m (300 ft) | 26 | | | | |
| Ocean Vista | 2215 Gottingen St. | Halifax | | | 20 | | 142 | | |
| The Marlstone | Albemarle Street | Halifax | | | 20 | | 291 | | |
| The Meridian | 1557 Hollis | Halifax | | 66 m (217 ft) | 21, 12, 6 | | | | |
| MZM Tower | 75 Wentworth Dr | Clayton Park | | | 19 | | 104 | | |

=== Proposed ===
| Building | Address | Community | Year proposed | Height | Storeys | Total area of Site | Number of Residential Units | Notes | Reference |
|---|---|---|---|---|---|---|---|---|---|
| The Maristella at King's Wharf | 50 King's Wharf Plaza | Dartmouth | 2017 | 120 m (390 ft) | 36 | 122,000 m^{2} (1,310,000 sq ft) | | When completed, The Maristella at King's Wharf will become the tallest building in Atlantic Canada and the first building in Atlantic Canada to reach 120 m (390 ft) in height, and the total complex will have 12 buildings. | |
| 2032–2050 Robie Street | 2032–2050 Robie Street | Halifax | 2014 | 85 m (279 ft) | 23 | 10,696 m^{2} (115,130 sq ft) | 102 | | |
| Wyse Road Development | 112 and 114 Wyse Road | Dartmouth | 2020 | 68.98 m (226.3 ft) | 20 | 1,941 m^{2} (20,890 sq ft) | 160 | The plan will include a 20-storey flatiron-shaped building on the corner of Nantucket Avenue and Wyse Road. | |
| 210–214 Willett Street | 210 and 214 Willett Street | Halifax | 2019 | 72 m (236 ft) | 8–19 | 17,000 m^{2} (180,000 sq ft) | 534 | Three proposed apartment buildings and three townhouses located in Halifax. | |
| Spring Garden West | Carlton Street, Robie Street, Spring Garden Road | Halifax | 2019 | 98.85 m (324.3 ft) | 30 | 4,961.1 m^{2} (53,401 sq ft) | 250 | | |
| 1591 Granville Street (Texpark site) | 1591 Granville Street and 1568 Hollis Street | Halifax | 2019 | 66 m (217 ft) | 21 | 3,657 m^{2} (39,360 sq ft) | 416 | | |
| Dartmouth Towers (Building A) | 20 Best Street | Dartmouth | 2023 | 93.7 m (307 ft) | 40 | | | | |
| Dartmouth Towers (Building B) | 20 Best Street | Dartmouth | 2023 | 93.7 m (307 ft) | 40 | | | | |
| Dartmouth Towers (Building C) | 20 Best Street | Dartmouth | 2023 | 93.4 m (306 ft) | 40 | | | | |
| 42 Canal Street (Building A) | 42 Canal Street | Dartmouth | | 90 m (300 ft) | 30 | | | | |
| Flow Towers (Tower 1) | 11 Canal Street | Dartmouth | | 88.7 m (291 ft) | 30 | | | | |

== Timeline of tallest buildings ==
History of the tallest buildings in Halifax
| Period | Building | Height | Storeys | Image |
|---|---|---|---|---|
| 1930–1936 | Hotel Nova Scotian (Hotel) | 50 m (160 ft) | 15 | |
| 1936–1967 | Dominion Public Building (Office) | 53 m (174 ft) | 13 | |
| 1967–1970 | Tupper Building (Education) | 70 m (230 ft) | 16 | |
| 1970–1971 | Duke Tower (Office) | 71 m (233 ft) | 16 | |
| 1971–2023 | The Vüze (Residential) | 98 m (322 ft) | 33 | |
| 2023–present | One 77 (Residential) | 111 m (364 ft) | 34 | One 77 Quinpool Road in Halifax on March 16, 2024 |

== See also ==
- List of tallest buildings in Atlantic Canada
- Architecture of Canada
- Canadian Centre for Architecture
- Society of Architectural Historians
