= List of tallest buildings in Atlantic Canada =

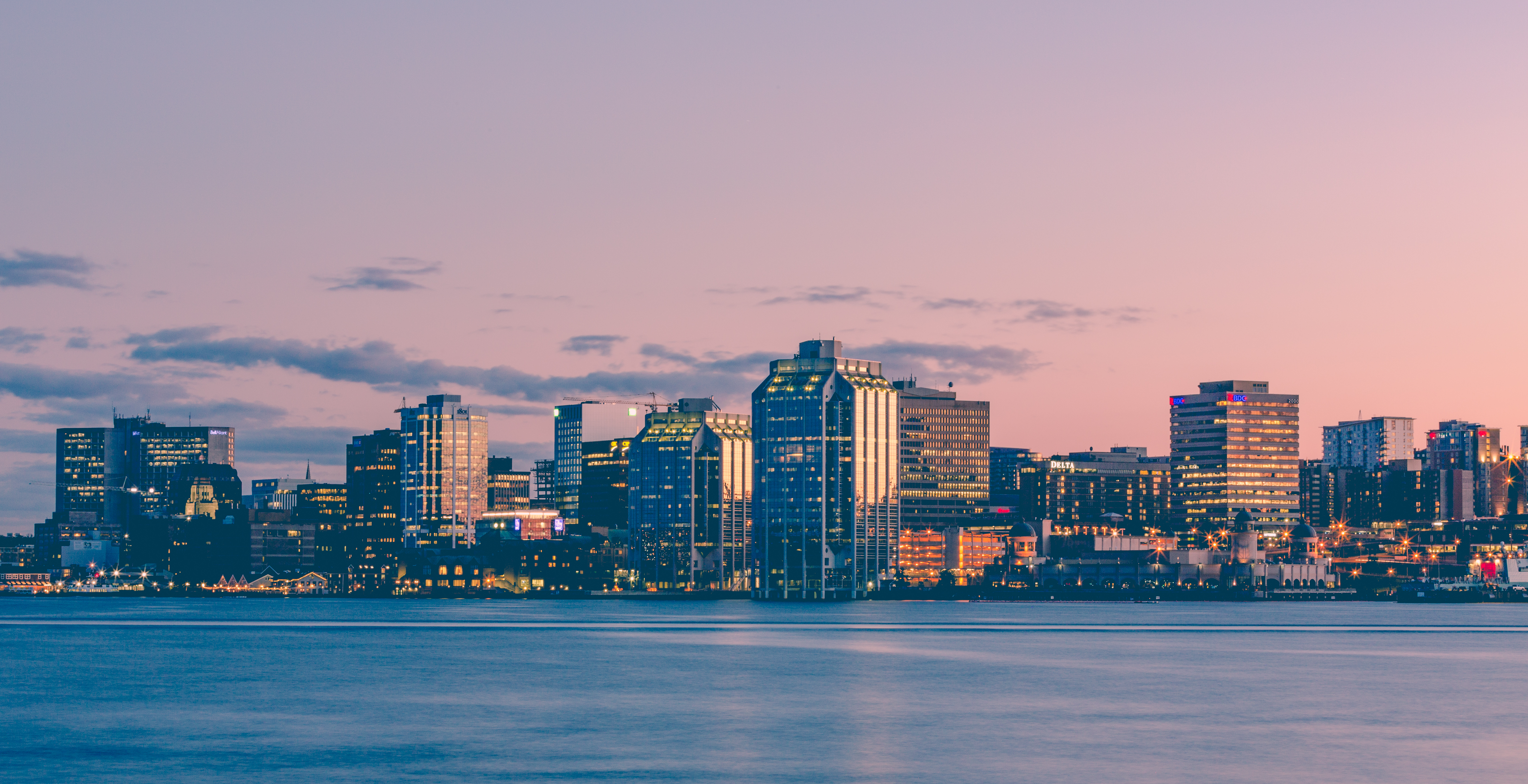
Downtown Halifax in 2015

This list includes the tallest buildings in Atlantic Canada, which comprises the provinces of New Brunswick, Newfoundland and Labrador, Nova Scotia, and Prince Edward Island. Buildings in five cities are included in this list; Fredericton, Halifax, Moncton, Saint John, and St. John's, each having buildings at least 60 metres tall.

The tallest of these high-rise buildings is One 77, which is 32 storeys and 111 m (364 ft) in height, which, when it topped out in 2023, supplanted the previous 52-year record-holder, The Vüze, which is 33 storeys and 106 m (348 ft) in height.

== Tallest buildings ==
This list ranks buildings in Atlantic Canada that stand at least 60 m (197 ft) tall, based on CTBUH height measurement standards. This includes spires and architectural details but does not include antenna masts. An equal sign (=) following a rank indicates the same height between two or more buildings.

Rank	Name	Image	City	Height m (ft)	Storeys	Year	Notes	Ref
1	One 77 (7177 Quinpool Road)	One 77 Quinpool Road in Halifax on March 16, 2024	Halifax	111 m (364 ft)	34		Topped out in 2023. Construction completed in 2024.	
2	The Vüze	Fenwick Place	Halifax	106 m (348 ft)	33	1971		
3	Richmond Yards (Building A)		Halifax	103.3 m (339 ft)	30	2024		
4	Purdy's Wharf Tower 2	Purdy's Wharf Tower 2	Halifax	87.8 m (288 ft)	22	1990		
5	The Alexander	The Alexander	Halifax	87.1 m (286 ft)	24	2018	Tallest building in Atlantic Canada built in the 2010s.	
6	1801 Hollis Street	1801 Hollis Street	Halifax	86.6 m (284 ft)	22	1985		
7	Barrington Tower		Halifax	83.8 m (275 ft)	20	1975		
8	TD Centre		Halifax	83 m (272 ft)	21	1974/2014	Building height raised from 73 m (239.5 ft) to 83 m (272.3 ft) in 2014.	
9	The Kevel		Halifax	82.5 m (270 ft)	27		Under construction. Once finished, will be the tallest building in the community and former city of Dartmouth.	
10=	Assumption Place	Assumption Place	Moncton	80.8 m (265 ft)	20	1972	Tied with Brunswick Square in Saint John for the tallest building in New Brunswick.	
10=	Brunswick Square office tower		Saint John	80.8 m (265 ft)	19	1976	Largest office building in New Brunswick by floor space (47,476.4 square metres (511,032 sq ft)), as well as the second largest in Atlantic Canada. Tied with Assumption Place in Moncton for the tallest building in New Brunswick.	
12=	The Maple		Halifax	79.9 m (262 ft)	21	2017		
12=	The Roy		Halifax	79.9 m (262 ft)	22	2019		
14	Summer Gardens		Halifax	76.2 m (250 ft)	21	1990		
15	Cogswell Tower	Cogswell Tower	Halifax	78.9 m (259 ft)	20	1975		
16	Maritime Centre	Maritime Centre	Halifax	78 m (256 ft)	21	1977		
17=	Our Lady of the Assumption Cathedral	Notre-Dame-de-l'Assomption Cathedral	Moncton	75 m (246 ft)+	4	1955	Gothic style Catholic cathedral.	
17=	Icon Bay		Halifax	75 m (246 ft)	22	2017		
17=	Queen Square	Queen Square in Dartmouth	Halifax	75 m (246 ft)	19	1975		
20	Purdy's Wharf Tower 1	Purdy's Wharf Towers 1 and 2	Halifax	73.8 m (242 ft)	18	1985		
21	Bank of Montreal Building	BMO Building, Halifax	Halifax	72.9 m (239 ft)	18	1971		
22	Duke Tower	Duke Tower	Halifax	71 m (233 ft)	16	1970		
23	Founders Square		Halifax	71 m (233 ft)	15	1970		
24	Cathedral of the Immaculate Conception		Saint John	70.1 metres (230 ft)	–	1853	Gothic style Catholic cathedral.	
25=	Tupper Building		Halifax	70 m (233 ft)	16	1967	Full name: Sir Charles Tupper Medical Building, Dalhousie University	
25=	Park Victoria		Halifax	70 m (233 ft)	21	1969		
25=	Summer Gardens		Halifax	70 m (233 ft)	21	1990		
28	Loyola Residence Tower	Loyola Residence Tower	Halifax	67.1 m (220 ft)	22	1971	Residence building of Saint Mary's University.	
29	Metropolitan Place	Metropolitan Place	Halifax	66.5 m (218 ft)	16	1987		
30	CIBC Building	CIBC Building	Halifax	65.5 m (215 ft)	16	1977		
31	The Trillium		Halifax	64.9 m (213 ft)	19	2011		
32	Confederation Building		St. John's	64 m (210 ft)	11	1959	Tallest building in Newfoundland and Labrador. The home of the Newfoundland and Labrador House of Assembly.	
33=	Christ Church Cathedral		Fredericton	60 m (197 ft)	—	1853	The original spire was 52.1m high, 7.9m shorter than originally designed due to structural concerns; rebuilt to originally planned 60.0m height in 1911 following a fire.	
33=	St. Patrick's Church		St. John's	60 m (197 ft)	—	1888	Closed as a church in 2022.	

== Tallest freestanding structures ==
Current as of July 2025
Rank	Name	Location	Pinnacle height	Type	Year completed	Image
1	Hebron platform	Grand Banks of Newfoundland	278 m (912 ft)	Oil platform	2017	Hebron Oil Platform
2	West White Rose platform	Grand Banks of Newfoundland	241 m (791 ft)	Oil platform	2025	
3	Hibernia Platform	Grand Banks of Newfoundland	224 m (735 ft)	Oil platform	1997	
4	Smokestacks 1 & 2, Coleson Cove Generating Station	Lorneville, New Brunswick	183 m (600 ft)	Chimney	1977	
6	Smokestack, Belledune Generating Station	Belledune, New Brunswick	169 m (554 ft)	Chimney	1991	
7=	Smokestacks 1, 2, & 3 Tufts Cove Generating Station	Tufts Cove, Nova Scotia	152.4 m (500 ft)	Chimney	1965	
7=	Smokestacks 1 & 2, Lingan Generating Station	Lingan, Nova Scotia	152.4 m (500 ft)	Chimney	1979	
7=	Smokestack, Trenton Generating Station	Trenton, Nova Scotia	152.4 m (500 ft)	Chimney	1969	
13=	Churchill River, South towers	Churchill Falls, Labrador	137 m (449 ft)	Hydro pylon	1971	
15	Bell Aliant Tower	Moncton, New Brunswick	127 m (417 ft)	Radio tower	1971	Bell Aliant Tower

== Tallest guyed masts ==
Current as of July 2025
Rank	Name	Location	Height	Year completed
1	Cape Race LORAN-C transmitter (new tower)	Cape Race, Newfoundland	259 m (850 ft)	1993
2	Fox Harbour LORAN-C transmitter	St. Lewis, Labrador	220 m (720 ft)	1983

== Tallest destroyed/demolished structures ==
Rank	Building	Location	Height	Structure type	Build material	Year built/demolished	Notes
1	Cape Race LORAN-C transmitter	Cape Race, Newfoundland	411.48 m (1,350.0 ft)	Guyed mast	Steel	1965–1993 (collapsed)	Collapse from fatigue failure of the eyebolt head in a compression cone insulator on a structural guy-wire.
2	Comfort Cove LORAN-C transmitter	Comfort Cove, Newfoundland	220 m (720 ft)	Guyed mast	Steel	1995–2015	
3	Smokestack, Dalhousie Generating Station #2	Dalhousie, New Brunswick	168 m (551 ft)	Chimney	Concrete	unknown–2015	(demolished by explosives) Video on YouTube
4	Smokestack, Dalhousie Generating Station #1	Dalhousie, New Brunswick	162 m (531 ft)	Chimney	Concrete	1967–2015	(demolished by explosives) Video on YouTube
5	Deep Panuke platform	Scotian Shelf		Natural gas platform		2013–2020	

== Tallest buildings under construction or proposed ==
=== Under construction ===
As of March 2023, the following buildings of at least 60 m (197 ft) height are under construction.

Building	Address	Location	Year proposed	Height m (ft)	Storeys	Site area	Number of Residential Units	Notes	Reference
Willow Tree Tower	6009–6017 Quinpool Road	Halifax	2018	78 m (256 ft)	25	2,021.6 m^{2} (21,760 sq ft)	unknown		
King's Wharf Building E	50 King's Wharf Place	Halifax		85 m (279 ft)	27	6,000 m^{2} (65,000 sq ft)			
Promenade Robie South (Tower 1)	Robie St.	Halifax		96 m (315 ft)	31	5,900 m^{2} (64,000 sq ft)			
Promenade Robie South (Tower 2)	College St.	Halifax		95 m (312 ft)	30	See above			
Ocean Vista	2215 Gottingen St.	Halifax			20				
Wyse Tower	1 Williams St.	Halifax		88 m (289 ft)	26	4,994 m^{2} (53,750 sq ft)	160		

=== Proposed ===
Building	Location	Height	Storeys	Year proposed	Status	Notes	Ref
King's Wharf	Halifax	109.1 m (358 ft)	33	2018	Approved	When completed, King's Wharf will become the tallest building in Atlantic Canada and the first building in Atlantic Canada to exceed 100 m (328 ft) in height.	
2032/2050 Robie Street	Halifax	87.1 m (286 ft)	24	2018	Proposed		
Infinity	Moncton	90 m (295 ft)	30	2023	Approved	When completed, Infinity will become the tallest building in New Brunswick	
St. Bernard's Place	Moncton	62 m (206 ft)	18	2024	Proposed		
Gateway Towers Building 1	Moncton	69 m (226 ft)	17	2024	Proposed		
Gateway Towers Building 2	Moncton	69 m (226 ft)	17	2024	Proposed		

== Timeline of tallest buildings ==
History of the tallest buildings in Atlantic Canada
Period	Building	Image	Location	Height	Storeys	Notes
1819–1851	Province House		Halifax	30 m (98 ft)	3	
1845–1853	Christ Church Cathedral		Fredericton	52.1 m (171 ft)	–	The original spire was 52.1m high, 7.9m shorter than originally designed due to structural concerns; rebuilt to originally planned 60.0m height in 1911 following a fire.
1853–1955	Cathedral of the Immaculate Conception		Saint John	70.1 m (230 ft)	–	Tallest building in Atlantic Canada for 102 years.
1955–1971	Our Lady of the Assumption Cathedral		Moncton	75 m (246 ft)+	4	
1971 – 2023	The Vüze		Halifax	106 m (348 ft)	33	
2023 –	One 77		Halifax	111 m (364 ft)	34	

== See also ==
- Architecture of Canada
- Canadian Centre for Architecture
- Society of Architectural Historians
- List of tallest buildings in Canada
