= Scotia Square =

Building complex in Halifax, Nova Scotia

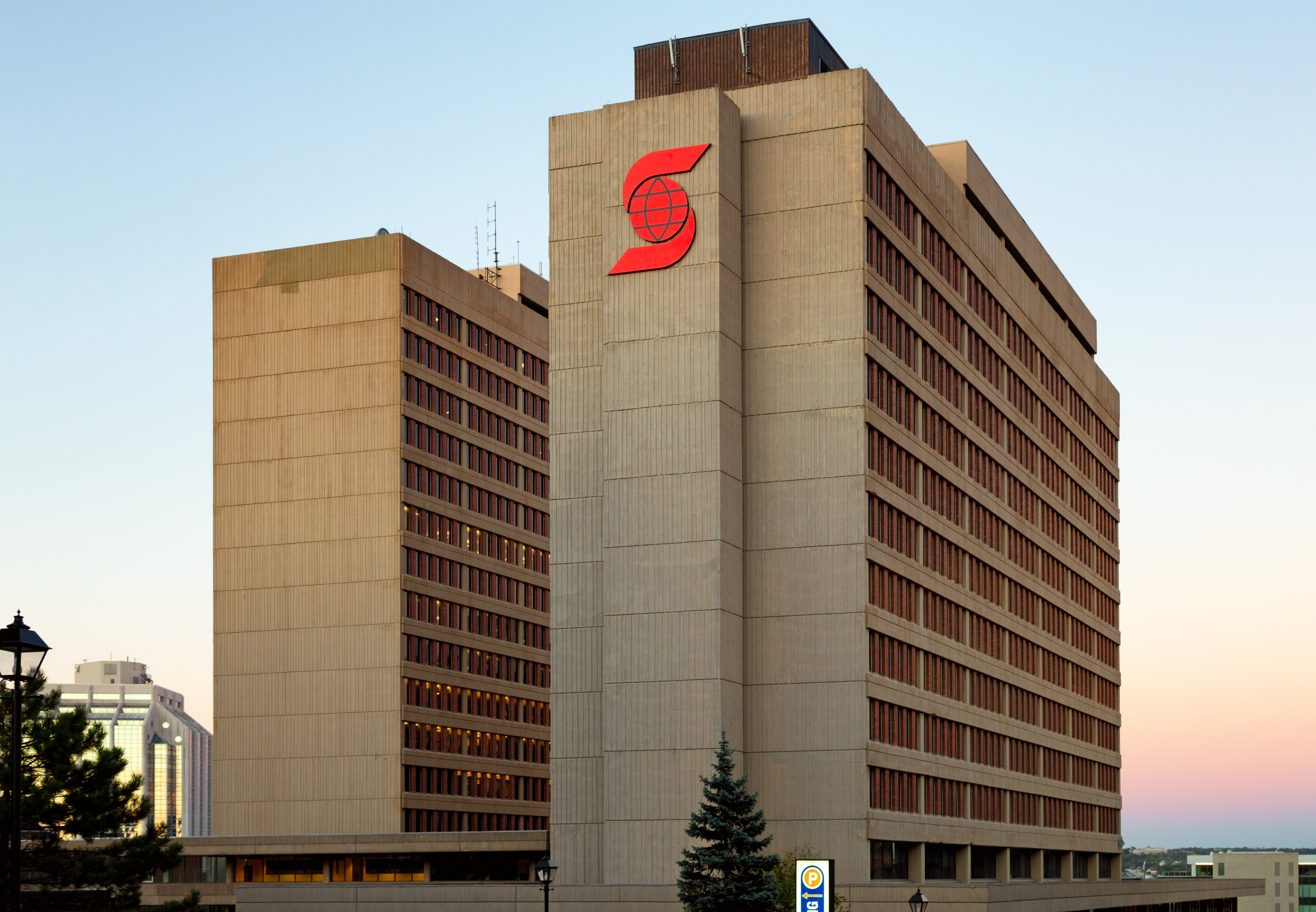
- Barrington Tower (left) and Duke Tower (right), completed in 1971 and 1970 respectively
- Interactive map of the Scotia Square area

General information
- Status: Completed
- Type: Mixed-use
- Architectural style: Modern
- Location: 5201 Duke Street; Halifax, Nova Scotia; B3J 1N9
- Coordinates: 44°39′0.00″N 63°34′38.13″W
- Groundbreaking: 1967
- Opened: 1969
- Owner: Crombie REIT
- Landlord: Crombie REIT

Design and construction
- Architects: Allward and Gouinlock
- Developer: Halifax Developments Limited
- Main contractor: Robert McAlpine Ltd.

Website
- scotiasquare.com

Scotia Square is a commercial development in downtown Halifax, Nova Scotia, Canada. It was built from the late 1960s to late 1970s and is managed by Crombie REIT.

The complex comprises several office buildings, a shopping centre, two hotels, a parking garage, and three apartment buildings. A fourth apartment building is under construction. Scotia Square is connected to the Downtown Halifax Link, a network of enclosed walkways, and hosts a major Halifax Transit bus terminal.

== History ==
=== Development context ===
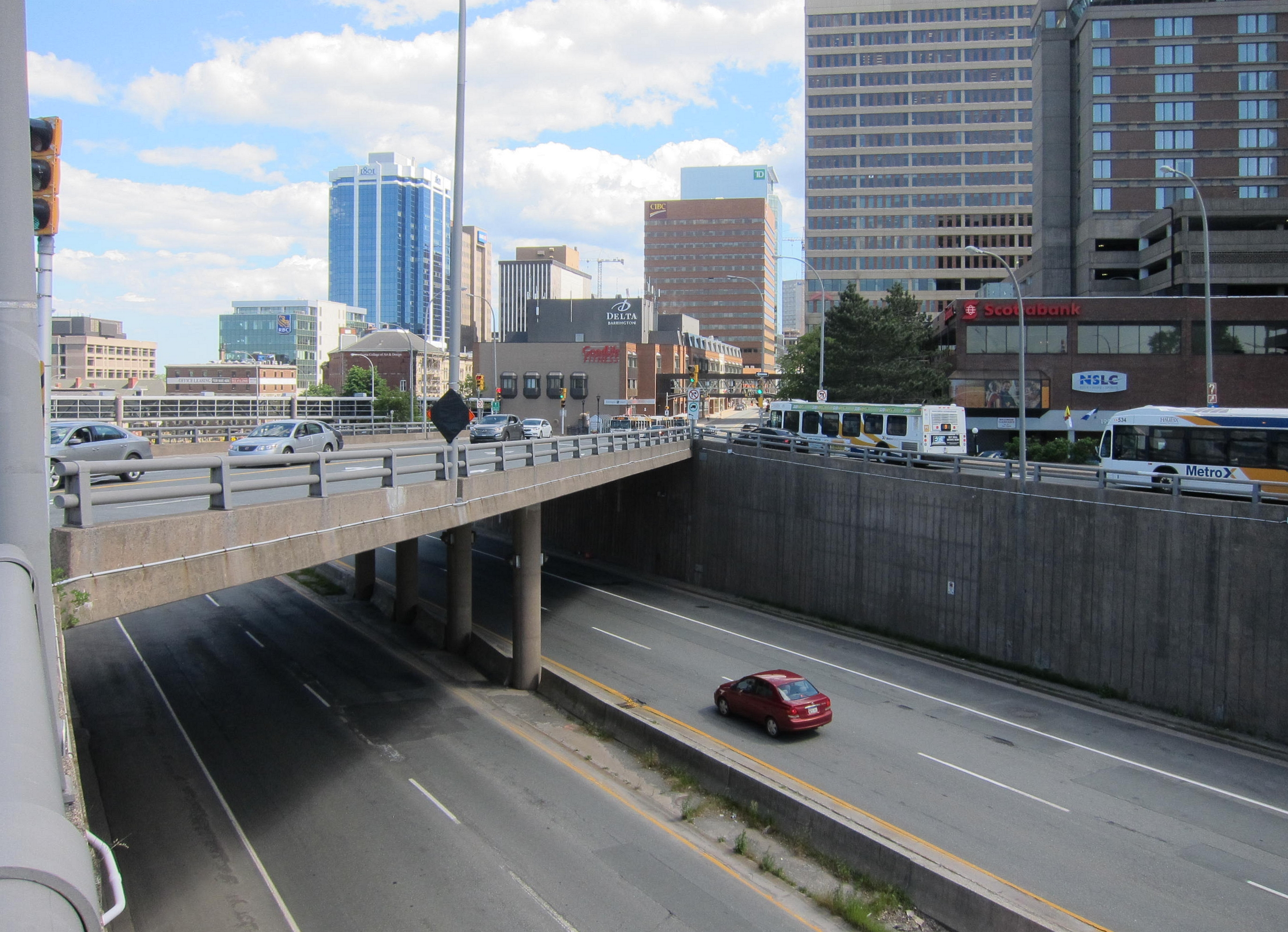
Scotia Square (right) was developed at the same time as the adjacent Cogswell Interchange (foreground)

Scotia Square was developed in an era when urban renewal was in vogue. Many cities were demolishing neighbourhoods considered blighted and obsolete. In 1956, the National Housing Act was amended, offering federal government assistance to redevelopment projects that put land to its "highest and best use". Halifax city council commissioned town planner Gordon Stephenson to draw up a redevelopment proposal for the city, which was published in 1957. Stephenson called the area now home to Scotia Square the "worst part" of the city centre, writing: "With the exception of the blocks between Barrington and Argyle Streets, it is in a generally deplorable condition. Here are some of the worst tenements, and dirty cinder sidewalks merge with patches of cleared land littered with rubbish. It is suggested that the clearing of this area should have high priority." Stephenson proposed a suite of recommendations across Halifax including the clearance of what was termed the "Central Redevelopment Area".

The City of Halifax applied for (and won) funds under section 23 of the National Housing Act to aid in land acquisition and clearance. The 12.81 acres (5.18 ha) of cleared land was held jointly by all three levels of government. In 1962, the city put out a request for proposals that attracted only one response, from the Woking Group. The city considered the proposal too ambitious and rejected it. In September 1963, the Woking Group submitted a more modest proposal developed with the assistance of architects Robert Matthew and Percy Johnson-Marshall of the University of Edinburgh. An agreement was signed between the city and the Woking Group in October 1963. This agreement later fell through due to financial issues.

K.C. Appleyard, an engineer who had helped set up Industrial Estates Limited, was critical of the city's failure to develop the Central Redevelopment Area. Halifax mayor Charles Vaughan challenged Appleyard to do something about it, and Appleyard reportedly went to the Halifax Club the same day to assemble a new development company, Halifax Developments Limited (HDL), with the board of directors composed of prominent members of the province's business elite. The company informed Halifax council of their plans, and hired architect Carl Koch and real estate consultant William Hardman. The city issued a second call for proposals, which this time attracted three entrants – HDL, Woking Group, and local developer Ralph Medjuck. Medjuck bought out Woking Group "at the last minute", giving him control over two of the proposals.

On 24 April 1966, the city announced that HDL's "Scotia Square" proposal had been selected. Halifax Developments Limited hired McAlpine Construction to serve as general contractor, and brought Toronto architecture firm Allward and Gouinlock on as an architectural consultant. A formal agreement between HDL and the City of Halifax was signed on 31 August 1966 and construction of the Trade Mart, the first phase of the development, began thereafter. The urban fabric of downtown Halifax was significantly altered by the development. Several streets disappeared from the map, including Buckingham Street, Bells Lane, Jacob Street, and sections of Grafton and Argyle streets.

Scotia Square was developed in concert with the adjacent Cogswell Interchange, a multi-level road interchange that opened in 1970 and was to be the first phase of a waterfront highway called Harbour Drive, which was cancelled due to public protest.

=== Construction and opening ===
Scotia Square at night, showing Barrington Tower, the Hotel Halifax, and Cogswell Tower

The first phase of Scotia Square, the Trade Mart building, was officially opened in 1968 by Nova Scotia premier George Isaac Smith. That building was described by the developer as "a combined shopping centre for wholesalers, distributors, manufacturers' agents, and a warehouse for light manufacturing and storage." As of 2023, the Trade Mart is called "Brunswick Place".

Premier Smith also opened the Scotia Square shopping centre on 15 October 1969. At that time, there were 29 stores. Another 30 stores opened by the end of 1969. The first office tower in the complex, Duke Tower, was opened on 1 February 1970.

The shopping centre, called Scotia Mall, housed tenants such as Famous Players cinema and a Woolco department store. A food court, known as the "Ports of Call", opened in July 1978 with 350 seats and seven food kiosks.

The second office tower, Barrington Tower, was officially completed on 1 April 1971 and served as the headquarters of the Nova Scotia Power Commission, later Nova Scotia Power Corporation. Following privatization of the electricity utility, it became the headquarters of Emera. Duke Tower and Barrington Tower are located directly on top of the Scotia Square mall.

In addition to offices, retail space, and a hotel, Scotia Square was designed to include several apartment buildings. The first of these was the 190-unit Scotia Towers, which opened in 1972.

In October 1971, it was announced that Halifax Developments Limited would partner with Canadian Pacific Hotels to build a new hotel at Scotia Square. Called the Chateau Halifax, the hotel was completed on 29 January 1974. It later became the Delta Halifax, and as of 2023 is operated as the Hotel Halifax by a different owner.

MacKeen Towers, the second residential building in the Scotia Square complex, opened in October 1974. It is named after Colonel John C. MacKeen.

The original development plan called for an apartment building at the north end of the parking garage. Owing to the successful leasing of the two office towers, it was decided to build a third office tower there instead. Called Cogswell Tower, this building was completed in May 1975.

The third residential building, the 155-unit Plaza 1881, began accepting tenants in May 1980. It was designed as a "deluxe apartment building" with a health club and swimming pool. It was built on the site of Halifax's old city market and police department.

=== Durham Leaseholds buildings ===
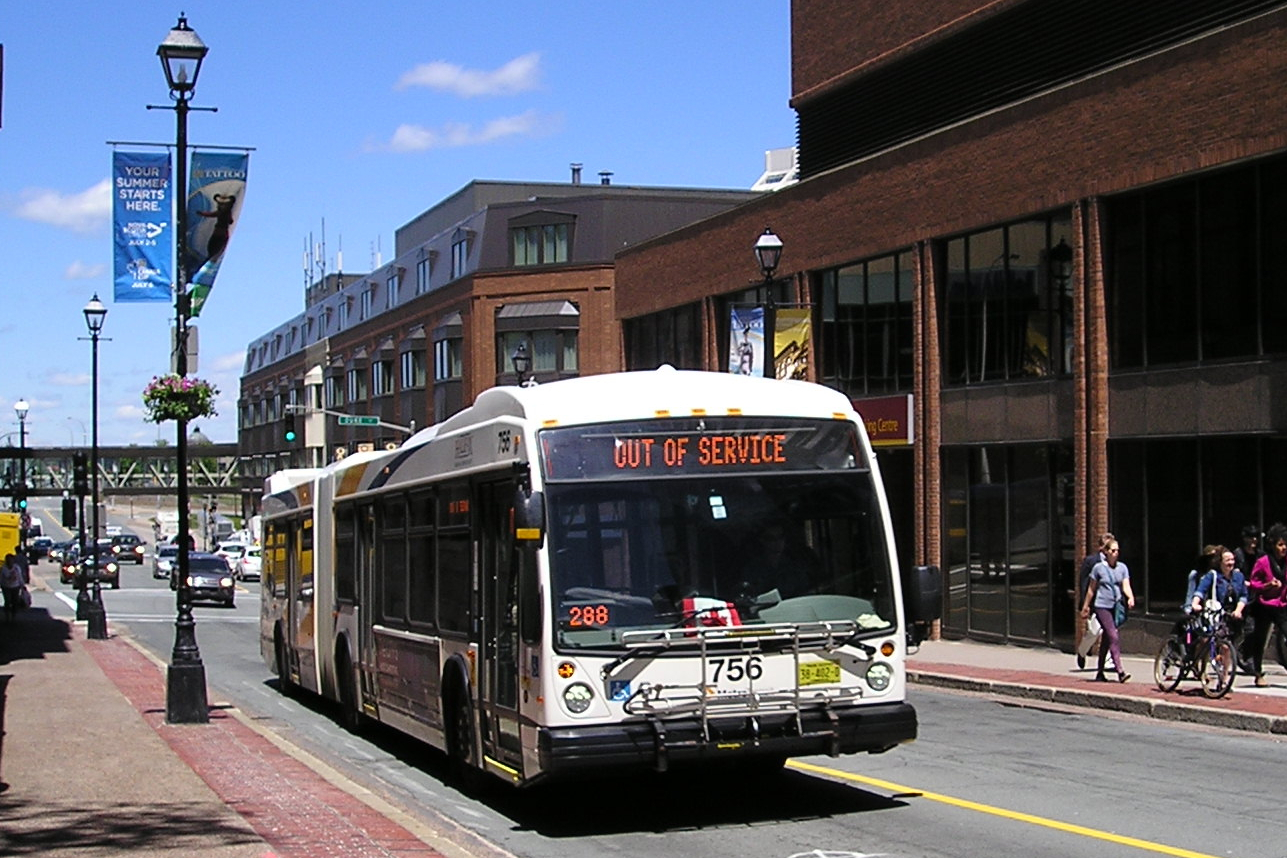
View of Barrington Street showing the low-rise Barrington Place (left) and high-rise CIBC Building (right) in the background

Two additional buildings on the opposite side of Barrington Street are marketed as being part of Scotia Square, though these were not part of the original development proposal. They were developed by Durham Leaseholds Limited, a joint venture between Halifax Developments Limited and Oxford Development Group of Edmonton, and are linked to the Square Square mall via enclosed pedestrian bridges.

1809 Barrington, better known as the CIBC Building, is an office high-rise that was announced by the Canadian Imperial Bank of Commerce in 1975 as the bank's new Atlantic regional headquarters, and opened as the Bank of Commerce Tower in September 1977. It is connected to TD Tower, which is owned by a different landlord and is not considered part of Scotia Square.

Barrington Place, a low-rise retail and hotel building, was opened on 26 March 1980. It housed the 203-room Barrington Inn, which was operated by Delta Hotels and was later known as the Delta Barrington. As of 2023, it operates as the Barrington Hotel. Barrington Place also contained 55 retail spaces on opening, providing together with Scotia Mall more than 150 shops and services, which Halifax Developments described as "the greatest single selection of stores and services in Atlantic Canada". The eastern side of the development incorporates the architecturally valuable facades of demolished 19th-century buildings facing the Granville Mall (a portion of Granville Street closed to motor vehicle traffic). In recent years, much of the Barrington Place retail space was converted to office space as well as a gym that occupies many of the former shopfronts along Granville Street.

=== Recent expansion ===
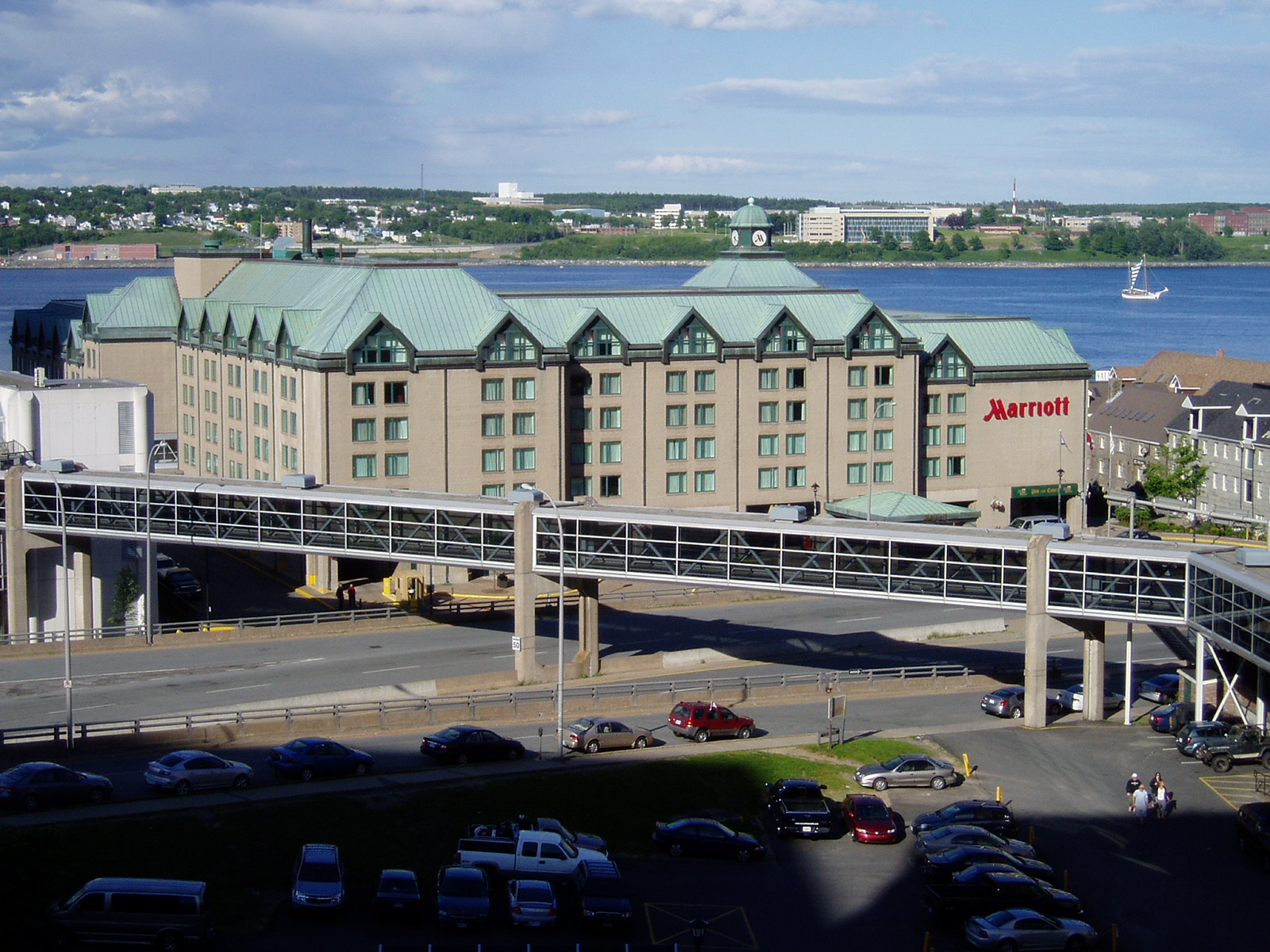
Footbridge linking Scotia Square to Purdy's Wharf and the Halifax waterfront

In the 1980s, a footbridge was built across the Cogswell Interchange linking Barrington Place to the Purdy's Wharf development on the waterfront. In the late 1990s, the podium façade at the corner of Duke and Barrington streets was altered.

In 2014, retail and dining storefronts were added to the three apartment buildings on Brunswick Street (MacKeen Towers, Scotia Towers, and Plaza 1881), replacing blank walls. This project won an Award of Merit for Civic Design in the Halifax municipal government's Urban Design Awards 2018.

An expansion of the Scotia Square shopping centre, along Barrington Street, was built around 2016-17. It was designed by DSRA Architects of Halifax. The three-storey development adds street-level commercial space, as well as office and retail space above. According to Crombie REIT, the design was intended to bring the site into better agreement with municipal design guidelines mandating more pedestrian-oriented districts. The project also added an indoor waiting room, at street level, for Halifax Transit passengers.

A new building, Westhill on Duke, was proposed in the 2010s for the southwest corner of the complex on the corner of Duke Street and Albemarle Street. It was to be an 18-storey building with retail, residential, and office space with a more pedestrian-friendly street frontage than the current blank wall. Architects involved on the project were DSRA Architects and Zeidler Partnership Architects.

The Westhill on Duke proposal was superseded in 2023 by "The Marlstone", a 291-unit residential building that began construction the same year. In 2025, Crombie sold a 50 per cent stake in the project to Montez Corporation of Toronto.

== Components ==
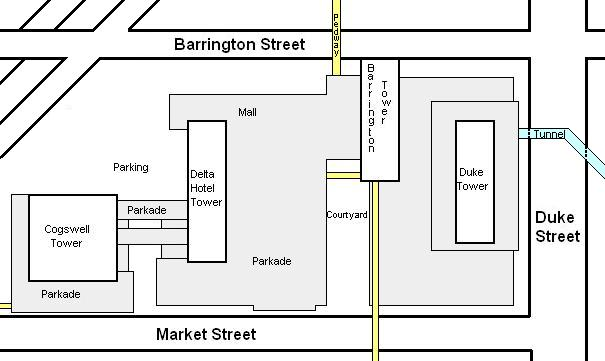
Map of central part of Scotia Square

Scotia Square consists of a shopping mall, two hotels, and a number of office and apartment towers connected to each other and to other buildings by pedways and tunnels. In the centre of the complex is Scotia Square Mall and a large food court servicing the adjoining office buildings. The complex is adjacent to the Cogswell Interchange, and it fronts on Duke Street to the south, Barrington Street to the east, and Albemarle Street (formerly Market Street) to the west.

=== Buildings ===
Name	Type	Opening year	Floor count	Notes	References
Brunswick Place	Office, warehouse	1968	5	Formerly the Trade Mart	
Podium	Retail, office, parking	1969	Varies	Includes a shopping centre, 1,700-space parking garage, tower lobbies, and office space.	
Duke Tower	Office	1970	16		
Barrington Tower	Office	1971	20		
Scotia Towers	Residential	1972	12		
Hotel Halifax	Hotel	1974	13	Formerly the Chateau Halifax, Delta Halifax	
MacKeen Towers	Residential	1974	12		
Cogswell Tower	Office	1975	20	14 office levels on top of 6 parkade levels	
CIBC Building	Office	1977	16		
Barrington Place	Hotel, retail, office	1980	5	Includes the Barrington Hotel	
Plaza 1881	Residential	1980	12		
The Marlstone	Residential	2026	20	Construction began in 2023.	

=== Pedways and tunnels ===
Scotia Square is connected to surrounding buildings by several pedestrian bridges and tunnels.

- Pedway connecting Brunswick Street to the Scotia Square Parkade, and the west parkade stairwell. Passes over Albemarle Street (formerly Market Street).
- Pedway connecting the northwest corner of Scotia Square Parkade (topmost level) to Brunswick Place (formerly called Trade Mart building), which is located beside Scotia Square Parkade, on the north side of Cogswell Street.
- Tunnel connecting mall to World Trade and Convention Centre, as well as the Scotiabank Centre (formerly Halifax Metro Centre). Passes under Duke Street.
- Three-level pedway going from Barrington & Duke Towers to a stairwell, which leads to parking and the mall. The middle level of this pedway joins up to the Brunswick Street Pedway mentioned above.
- Pedway going from Scotia Square Mall, over Barrington Street, and into Barrington Place Shops. From there one can go via pedway to Purdy's Wharf, Casino Nova Scotia, the CIBC Building, and the TD Tower.

=== Shopping centre ===
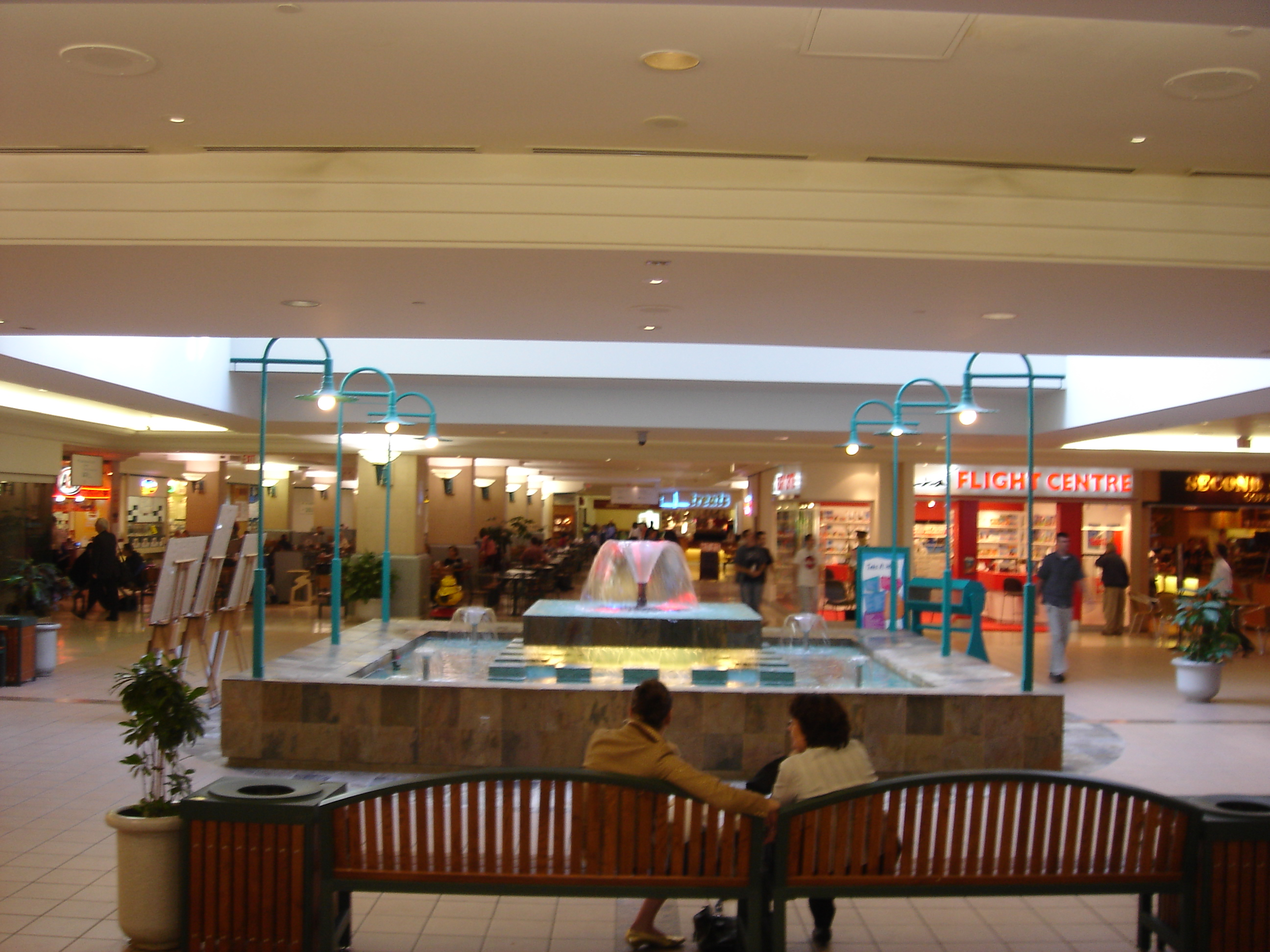
Interior of Scotia Square mall prior to renovation (fountain removed in 2012)

The Scotia Square mall is mainly located beneath Duke and Barrington towers. It has grown smaller over time, as the uppermost floor was converted to office space. Today, the mall occupies one level (except for the NSLC outlet next to the Barrington Street entrance at street level).

The food court was renovated in 2014 and named "The Mix" by Crombie REIT. The court features 14 different food vendors ranging from large fast food chains like McDonald's to locally owned vendors like Mama Gratti's Deli & Market. Various upgrades to seating during the renovation allows large foot traffic during lunchtime rushes during the week. Being based toward servicing those working downtown the hours of operation of most food court tenants are 9:30 a.m. to 6:00 p.m.

The municipal government operated a service centre in the mall, but this closed permanently in 2020.

As of 2023, the mall is home to 11 food outlets and 23 shops and services. Major tenants include Lawtons, Scotiabank, Coles, NSLC, Dollarama, and Goodlife Fitness.

=== Transit terminal ===
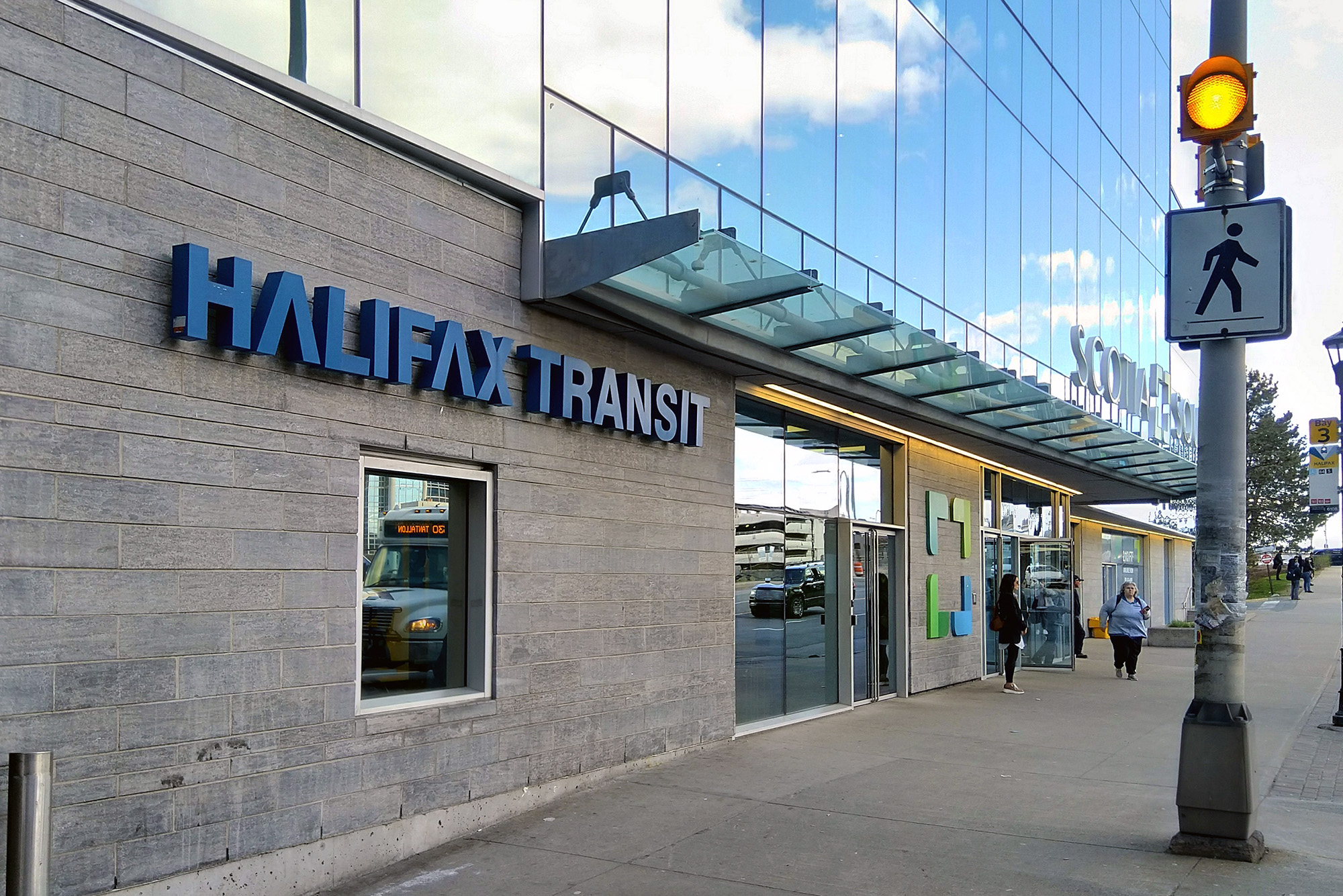
Passenger waiting room at Scotia Square Terminal

Scotia Square is home to one of the busiest Halifax Transit bus terminals in the city; Scotia Square Terminal saw over 11,000 passengers board or alight on an average weekday in 2019/20. As of October 2021, it was served by 33 bus routes. Most of the buses stop on Barrington Street with the exception of the regional express (MetroX) routes, which are located on Albemarle Street, and route 2, which stops on Duke Street in the Clayton Park-bound direction.

As part of a renovation and expansion of the Scotia Square shopping centre on Barrington Street, an indoor waiting room was added for Halifax Transit passengers. Located at street level, on the west side of Barrington Street, the waiting room opened on 27 November 2017.

There are plans to expand and enhance Scotia Square Terminal as part of the Cogswell Interchange redevelopment project, adding dedicated transit lanes, seating, improved lighting, canopies, and electronic signage.
