= Cogswell Tower =

Office tower in Halifax, Canada

Coordinates: 44°39′0.4″N 63°34′38″W

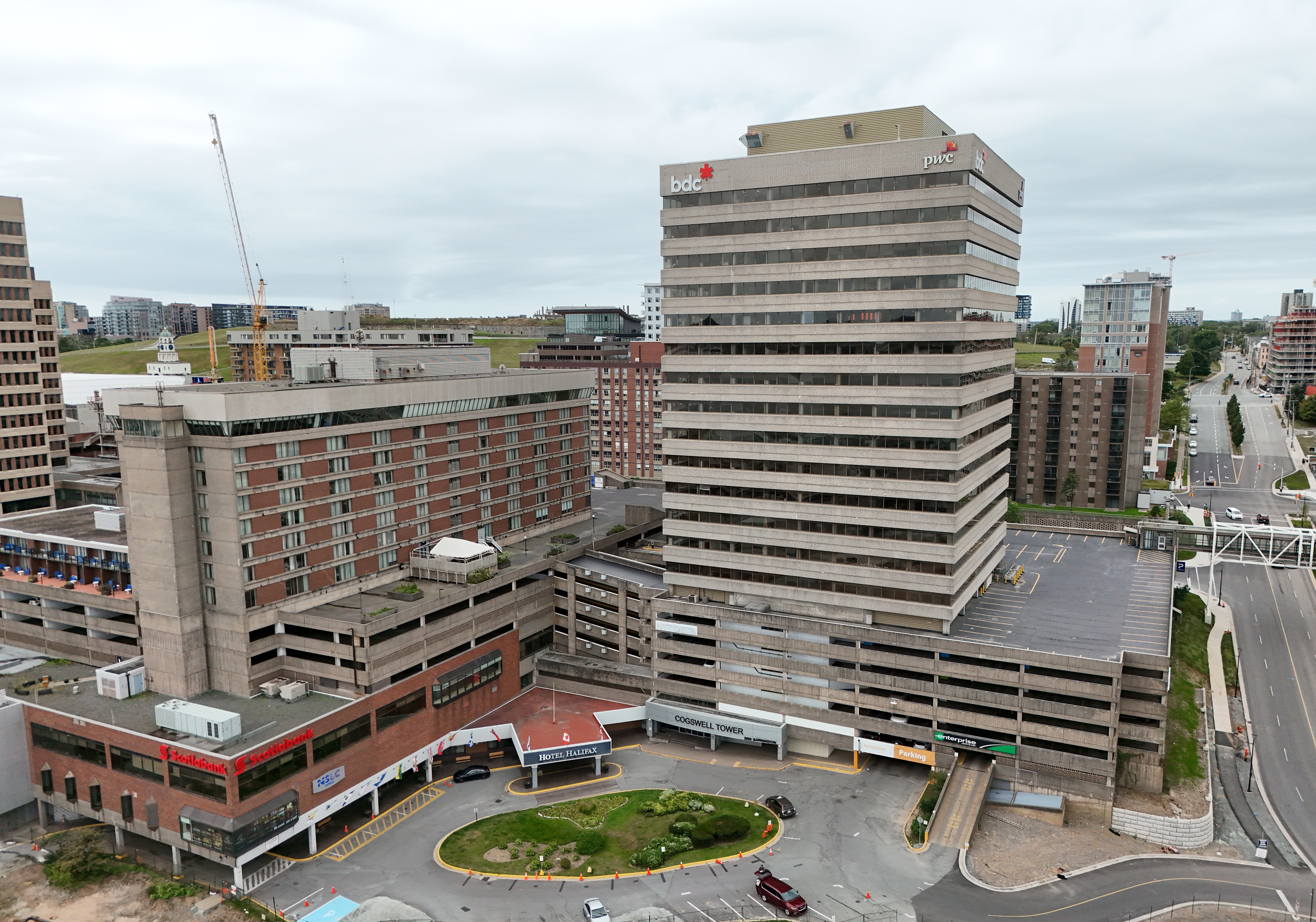
Aerial view of Cogswell Tower

Cogswell Tower is part of the Scotia Square Complex in downtown Halifax, Nova Scotia. It is used for office and commercial space and stands at 79 metres (259 ft) with 14 floors, plus levels G, P1, P2, P3, P4, P5, P6 (bottom to top) underneath, which are part of the parkade on which Cogswell Tower sits. G level is ground level for Barrington Street and connects to the lobby of the Delta Halifax, P1 enters into Scotia Square, and P3 level is ground level for Albemarle (formerly Market) Street. The building is connected to the Downtown Halifax Link system.

The Business Development Bank of Canada's Halifax branch is located here.

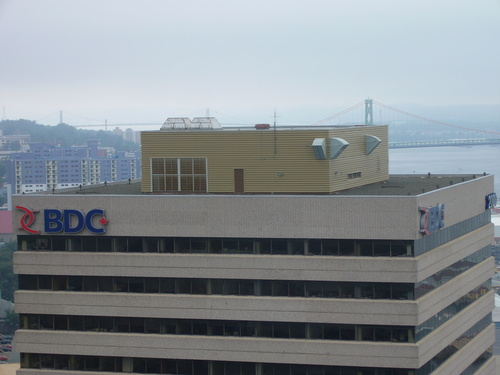
Cogswell Tower from top of Barrington Tower

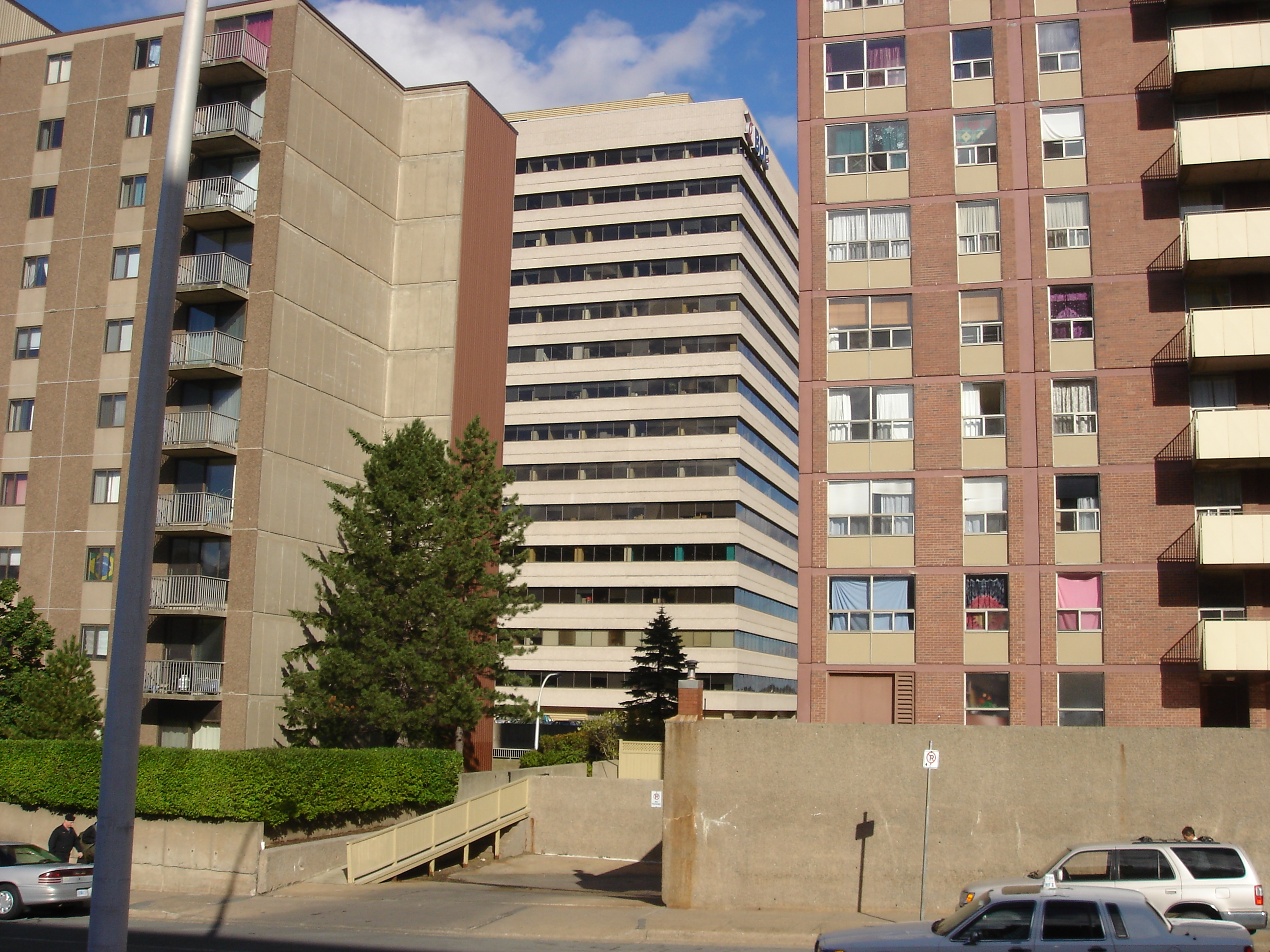
Cogswell Tower between two apartment buildings

Other buildings in the Scotia Square Complex are Duke Tower, Barrington Tower, the CIBC Building, and Brunswick Place. Like all buildings in the complex it is managed by Crombie REIT.

== History ==
Cogswell Tower was developed by Halifax Developments Limited as the third office tower of the Scotia Square development. It was completed in May 1975.

== See also ==
- List of tallest buildings in Halifax, Nova Scotia
