= Duke Tower =

Building in Halifax, Nova Scotia

Coordinates: 44°38′57.2″N 63°34′34.1″W

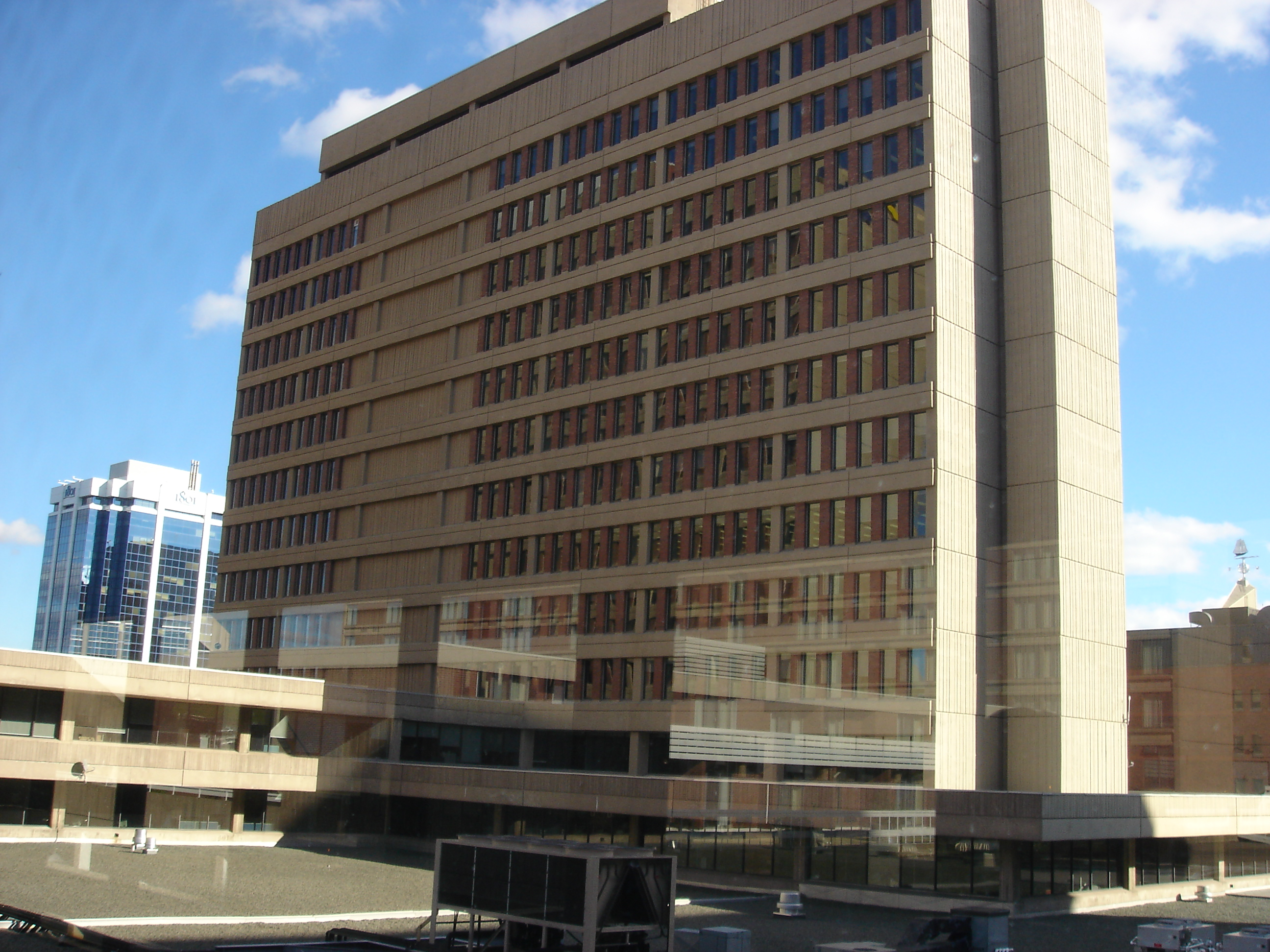
Duke Tower from inside a Pedway leading to Scotia Square Complex

Duke Tower is an office building part of the Scotia Square complex in Downtown Halifax, Nova Scotia, Canada.

It has approximately 220,000 square feet (2043 square metres) of retail space on 14 floors.

The building is connected to the Downtown Halifax Link system and has a ground level entrance on Duke Street and an entrance in Scotia Square Mall.

== History ==
Duke Tower was built by Halifax Developments Limited as Stage 3 of the Scotia Square development complex. It was opened on 1 February 1970, a few months after the opening of the shopping centre underneath it.

== See also ==
- List of tallest buildings in Halifax, Nova Scotia

== Other buildings in the Scotia Square Complex ==
- Barrington Place
- Barrington Tower
- CIBC Building
- Cogswell Tower
