= Casino Nova Scotia =

Casino in Nova Scotia, Canada

- Interactive map of Casino Nova Scotia
- Location: 1983 Upper Water Street Halifax, Nova Scotia B3J 3Y5; 44°39′10.9″N 63°34′33.1″W
- Opened: June 1, 1995
- Gaming space: 34,900 square feet (3,240 m^{2})^{2}
- Signature attractions: "The Schooner Showroom"; The Compass Room
- Notable restaurants: Trapeze; Paradise Buffet; Java Jazz
- Casino type: Land-Based
- Owner: Great Canadian Entertainment
- Previous names: "Caesar's Sheraton Halifax Casino"
- Renovated in: April 24, 2000, June 1, 2006
- Website: www.casinonovascotia.com

Casino Nova Scotia is located in Nova Scotia, Canada, and has locations in Halifax and Sydney. Steelman Partners designed Casino Nova Scotia and its sister casino Sydney Casino.

== Halifax casino ==
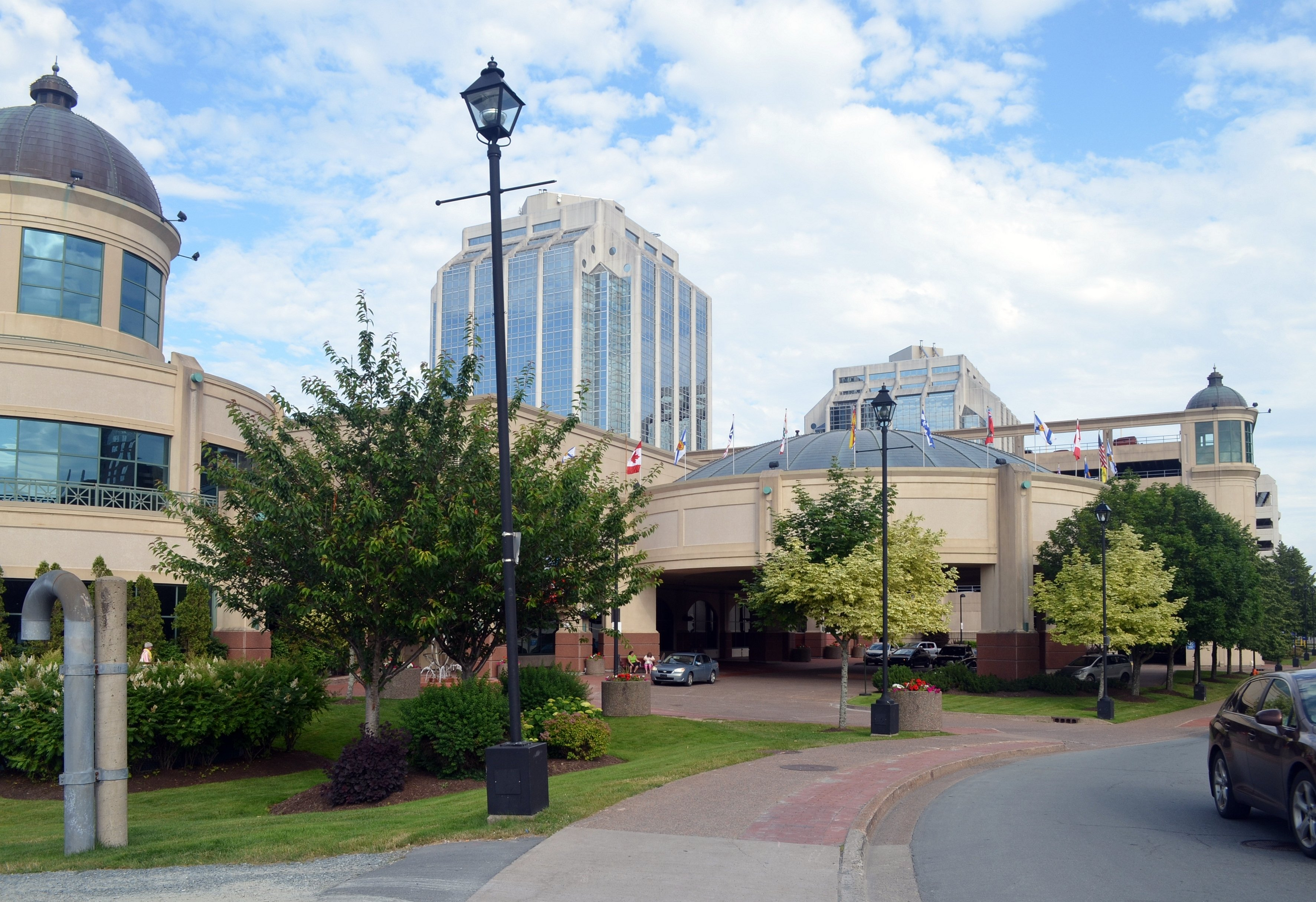
A view of the entrance to the Casino Nova Scotia in downtown Halifax, Nova Scotia, Canada

The Casino Nova Scotia opened a temporary location in the Sheraton Hotel Halifax on June 1, 1995. On April 24, 2000 it moved to a brand new, $100-million "Vegas-style" facility on the downtown Halifax waterfront. It was originally owned by Caesar's until October 2005, when Casino Nova Scotia was bought out by Great Canadian Gaming Corporation. When the Casino was sold to Great Canadian Gaming the affiliated Sheraton Hotel was sold separately to the Marriott Corporation. In 2007, workers at the casino voted in favor of organizing a labour union.

The casino has 650 slots and table games. There is an attached 550-car parkade, including 14 wheelchair-accessible spaces. The casino is connected via pedway to the Marriott Halifax Harbourfront, formerly the Casino Nova Scotia Hotel and Sheraton Hotel Halifax. The pedway also connects to Purdy's Wharf, Scotia Square, and the downtown core.

In January 2026, the provincial government announced that Great Canadian Entertainment plans to replace the Halifax casino with a new one in the Dartmouth Crossing suburban retail park.

== Restaurants and lounges ==
There are several drinking and dining facilities in the casino, including nightly buffets and Sunday Brunch buffet in the 3Sixty Buffet Restaurant, casual dining and live entertainment in the 3Sixty Lounge, and concerts, conventions and other attractions in the Compass Room and the Schooner room.

== Structural engineering ==
Engineered by BMR of Halifax, the casino has been described as one of the most complicated in the company's history. The size of the site meant that part of the building was built over water 21 metres (69 ft) deep (at its deepest point). Most of the land that the casino occupies had been created years earlier when that part of Halifax Harbour was infilled with loose rock and excavation material from other construction sites — reclaimed land was too soft to serve as a stable building foundation. BMR overcame the problem by engineering a design which incorporated driving caissons through the fill material and into the bedrock below. Then, using a specially designed doughnut-shaped pile cap as a support system, the engineers worked with the form work contractor to hang the casino's floor structure on the supporting caissons like a huge wharf.

== Sydney casino ==
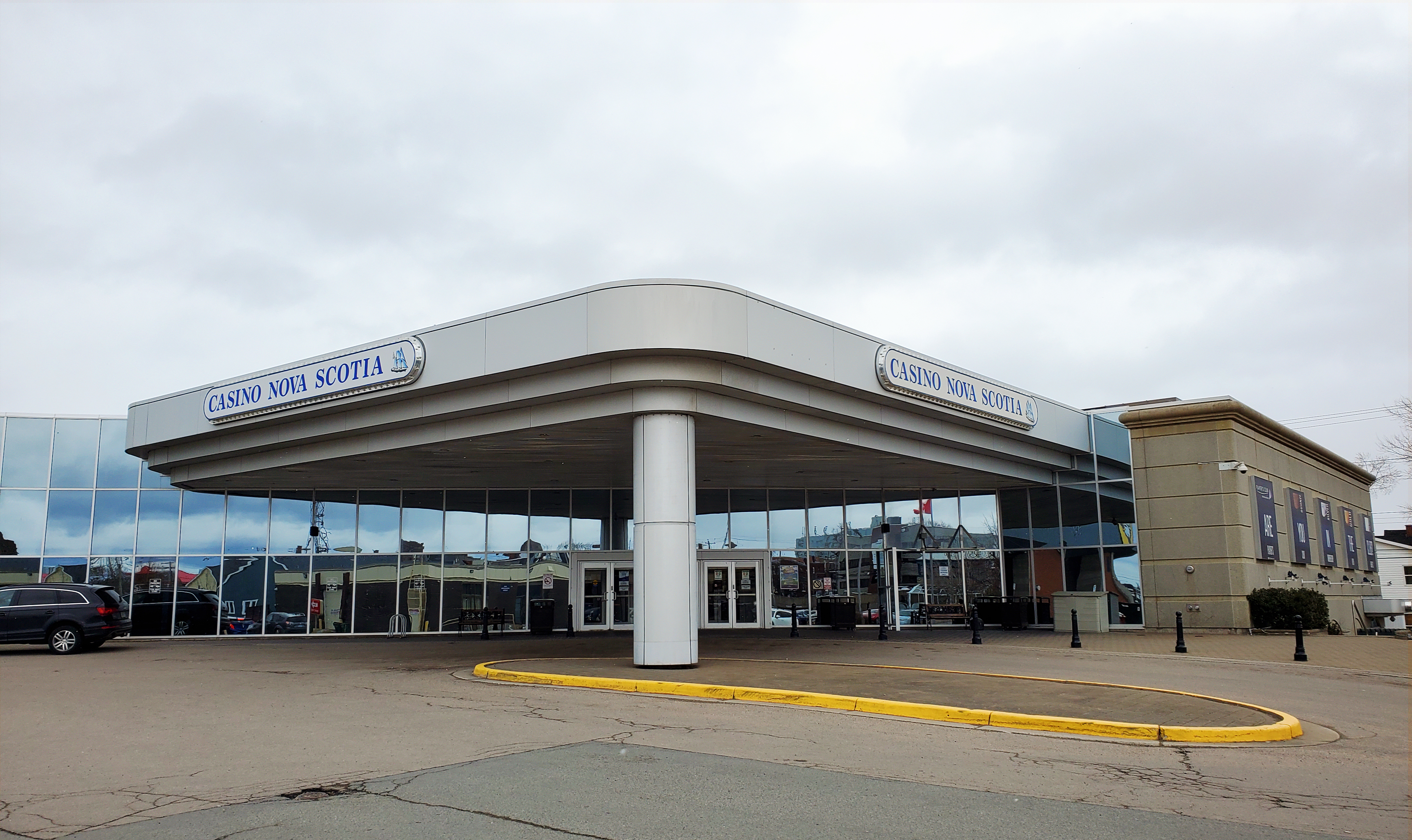
The entrance of the casino in Sydney, Nova Scotia, in 2022

Casino Nova Scotia added a sister casino in Sydney on August 1, 1995. The casino, located on George St. in downtown Sydney, was constructed as an addition to the city's Centre 200.

== See also ==
- List of casinos in Canada
- Halifax, Nova Scotia
- Downtown Halifax
- Downtown Halifax Link
- Citadel Hill
