= Harbour Drive =

Harbor Drive can refer to:

- Harbor Drive, a street in Portland Oregon
- Harbour Drive, a proposed freeway in Halifax, of which the Cogswell Interchange is the only portion built
- Harbor Drive, a boulevard and surface street in San Diego, California
