= Downtown Halifax Link =

Network of pedways in Halifax, Nova Scotia, Canada

Coordinates: 44°39′1.6″N 63°34′30.1″W

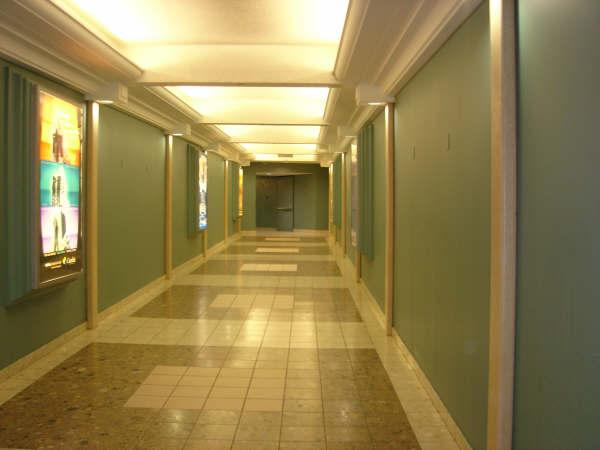
A tunnel under Duke Street, connecting the World Trade and Convention Centre to Scotia Square

The Downtown Halifax Link system is a network of climate-controlled pedways (pedestrian tunnels and skywalks) connecting various office buildings, hotels, parkades, and entertainment venues around downtown Halifax, Nova Scotia, Canada. It is similar to Toronto's PATH or Montreal's RÉSO system, but on a much smaller scale. These walkways are all open to the public, and are convenient during inclement weather and the winter months.

== Connected buildings ==
Hotels:

- The Prince George Hotel
- The Hotel Halifax (formally Delta Halifax)
- The Barrington Hotel (formally Delta Barrington)
- Marriott Halifax Harbourfront (formerly Casino Nova Scotia hotel)

Map of the Downtown Link.

Office buildings:

- TD Tower (Barrington Street)
- Barrington Tower (Scotia Square)
- Duke Tower (Scotia Square)
- Cogswell Tower (Scotia Square)
- CIBC Building (Barrington Street)
- Brunswick Place formerly Trade Mart (Scotia Square)
- World Trade and Convention Centre
- Purdy's Wharf
  - Purdy's Landing
  - Purdy's Wharf Tower 1
  - Purdy's Wharf Tower 2

Residential:

- Plaza 1881 (Brunswick Street)

Entertainment and retail:

- Scotiabank Centre
- Casino Nova Scotia
- Scotia Square Mall
- Granville Mall
- Barrington Place Shops

== Proposed connections ==
Trade Centre Limited (TCL), the developers of the new Halifax Convention Centre, have sought to connect the new facility with the Downtown Halifax Link via a new tunnel along Grafton Street. Scott Ferguson, president of TCL, said that such a tunnel would help Halifax compete by linking the new centre with the existing network of hotel rooms. The tunnel is expected to cost $7-10 million. City staff are exploring possible alternatives but have not ruled the tunnel out.
