= Pedestrian separation structure =

Pedestrian infrastructure

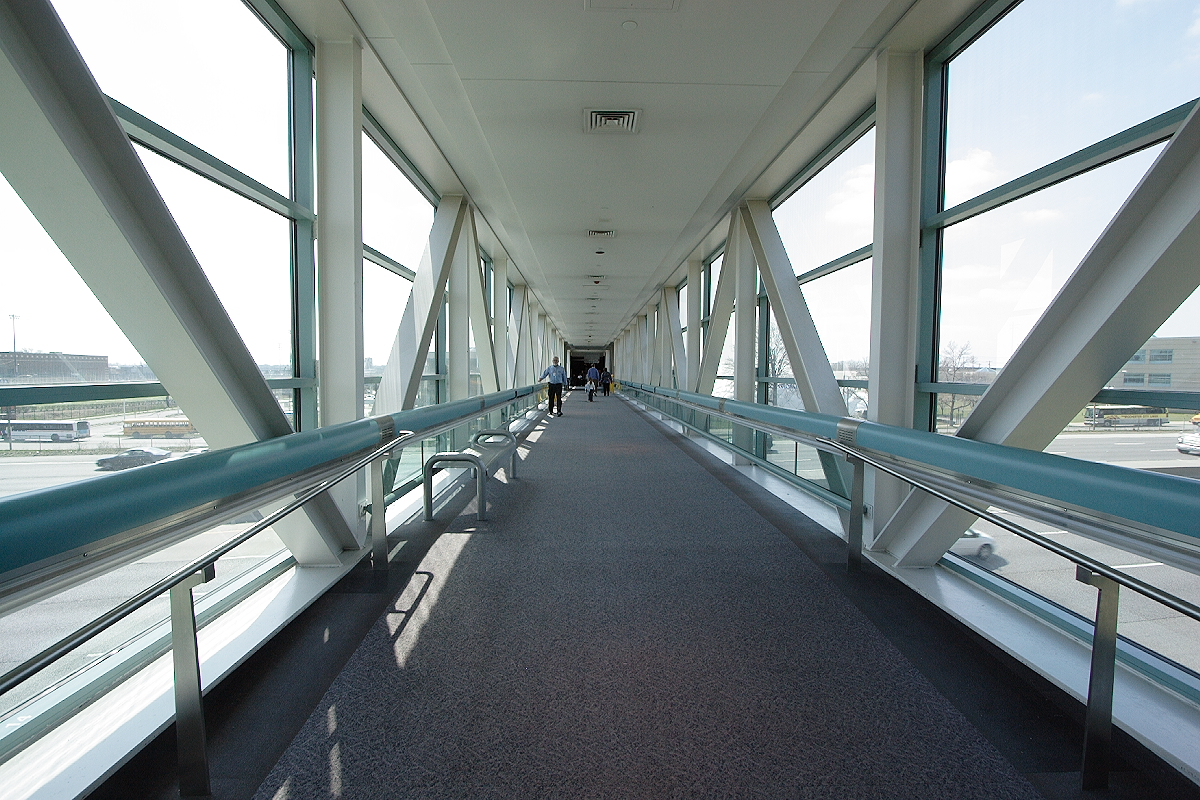
This bridge allows pedestrians over I-64 in St. Louis, Missouri, United States

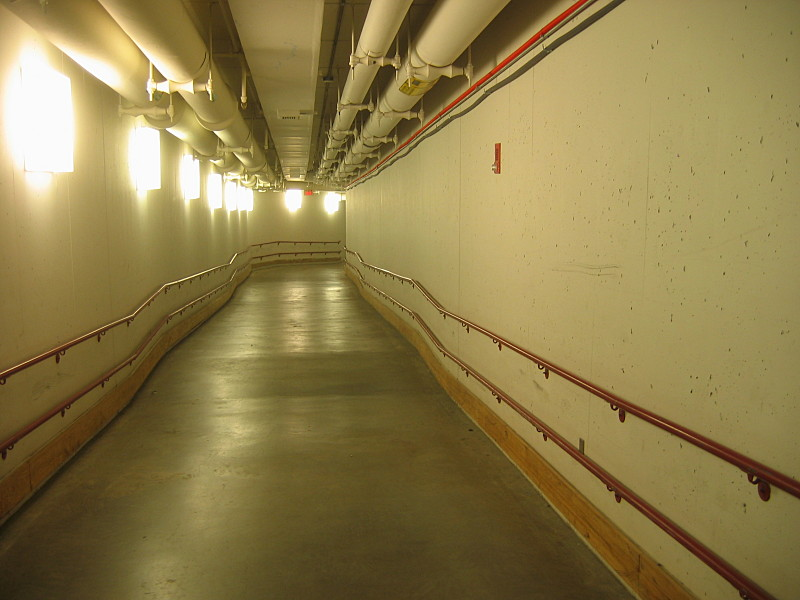
This tunnel at the Massachusetts Institute of Technology allows pedestrians to get between buildings on either side of Ames Street

A pedestrian separation structure is any structure that removes pedestrians from a roadway, street or railway track. This creates a road junction where vehicles and pedestrians do not interact.

This can be considered a type of grade separation structure on the road.

These structures can be located either above the roadway or below the roadway. In the U.S., access under the Americans with Disabilities Act requirements means that stairs cannot be the only access to these structures. An elevator must be provided or a ramp built that conforms to the grade requirements under the ADA regulations.

In the broadest sense, building codes that limit the number of driveways that cross sidewalks may be viewed as making the sidewalks a separation structure.

In many areas, wildlife crossings are provided in wilderness areas to allow wildlife to cross roadways without risking accidents. While not specifically built for people, they could be used by people in those areas.

== History ==
Many of the early forms of these structures were provided to cross limited-access highways in areas that were built up and lacked intersections. By allowing pedestrians and bicycles to cross over the highway, these bridges were viewed as low-cost alternatives to intersections.

In 1999, Las Vegas, Nevada began a major effort to install pedestrian bridges at major intersections along the Las Vegas Strip, to reduce traffic congestion and improve pedestrian safety.

== See also ==
- Overpass
- Pedestrian safety through vehicle design
- Pedway
- Skyway
- Subway
- Tropicana - Las Vegas Boulevard intersection
- Tunnel
