= Purdy's Wharf =

Office complex in Halifax, Canada

Coordinates: 44°39′7.75″N 63°34′27.54″W

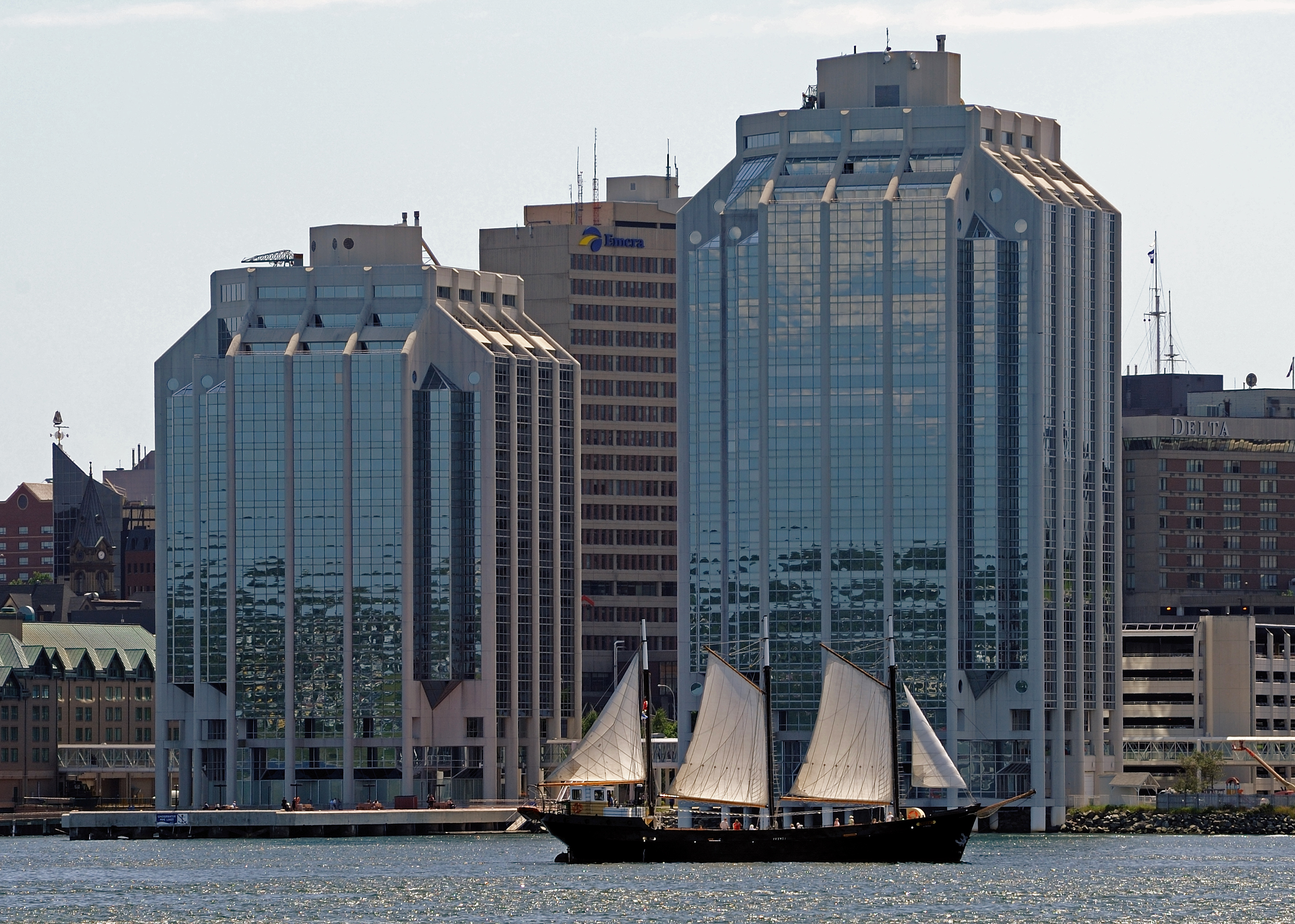
- Tower I (left) and Tower II (right)
- Interactive map of the Purdy's Wharf area

General information
- Type: Office complex
- Architectural style: Postmodern
- Construction started: 1983
- Completed: Phase I: 1985; Phase II: 1989
- Owner: GWL Realty Advisors

Height
- Height: Tower I: 74.0 m (242.8 ft); Tower II: 88.0 m (288.7 ft)

Technical details
- Floor count: Tower I: 18 floors; Tower II: 22 floors

Design and construction
- Architect: Shore Tilbe Henschel Irwin Peters
- Developer: J.W. Lindsay Enterprises
- Structural engineer: George Brandys and Associates Ltd.

Purdy's Wharf in relation to the Downtown Halifax Link pedway system

Purdy's Wharf is an office complex in Halifax, Nova Scotia, Canada. Built over the water at the edge of Halifax Harbour and resting on pilings, it consists of two office towers, and a smaller office structure called Purdy's Landing. The complex is located along the Halifax Waterfront Boardwalk.

== History ==
=== Planning ===
The complex was developed by J.W. Lindsay Enterprises, based in Dartmouth, which submitted a planning application on 13 July 1981 for the Purdy's Wharf development, to be constructed on the former Purdys Brothers lands as well as some land owned by the City of Halifax and the Canada Mortgage and Housing Corporation (CMHC). The development plan relied on the city and CMHC agreeing to sell these lands.

A public hearing was held in relation to the Purdy's Wharf development on 7 October 1981. Halifax city council approved the proposal on 15 October 1981 as well as the sale of the city-owned lands, where the parking garage is now located. The development agreement between the developer and the city was further negotiated, and a revised agreement was approved by city council on 18 May 1983.

=== Construction and opening ===
The architect was Shore Tilbe Henschel Irwin Peters of Toronto, while the structural consultant was George Brandys and Associates Ltd., now known as BMR Structural Engineering, of Halifax. Construction began in 1983. The first phase of the development, the 18-storey Tower I, opened in May 1985. Built at a cost of around C$49 million, phase one also included a four-storey office building and a parking garage.

In January 1987, the developers announced that a second phase would be built. Comprising a 22-storey, 34,000-square-metre (370,000 sq ft) office tower and an expansion of the parking garage, the expansion was estimated to cost C$65 million. The same architecture firm was employed. The project was completed in 1989, coinciding with the beginning of the early 1990s recession, which impacted the real estate market and contributed to the complex suffering from a 35.2 per cent vacancy rate in 1990.

== Ownership ==
In January 1999, Olympia and York purchased a 47.5 per cent stake in the development for C$39.9 million. At that time, GWL Realty Advisors owned 47.5 per cent while J.W. Lindsay owned the remaining five per cent. In early 2000, J.W. Lindsay sold their share of the complex to the other two co-owners, which each increased their ownership to 50 per cent.

In July 2005, Olympia and York sold their 50 per cent stake to GWL Realty Advisors for C$63.0 million.

== Design ==
Purdy's Wharf consists of two office towers, a four-storey building called Purdy's Landing, a seven-storey multistorey car park, and outdoor spaces including a wharf and green space. Purdy's Landing is commonly referred to as the "Xerox building", due to a large Xerox sign that used to hang on the exterior of the building. Pedways connect the complex to Casino Nova Scotia and the Downtown Halifax Link system.

Purdy's Wharf has a unique, energy-efficient cooling system that works by circulating sea water through a heat exchanger system with the building's cooling water. The colder sea water chills the building's cooling water, which is then circulated through the buildings.

== Transport ==
The complex is located within walking distance of the main Halifax Transit bus terminal, Scotia Square Terminal, via an enclosed footbridge spanning the former Cogswell Interchange.

It is also a short walk from the Halifax Ferry Terminal.

== See also ==
- List of tallest buildings in Atlantic Canada
