= Barrington Street =

Road in Halifax, Nova Scotia, Canada

- Interactive map of Barrington Street
- Maintained by: Halifax Regional Municipality; Transportation & Public Works
- Component highways: Trunk 2
- North end: Hwy 111 Windsor Street; MacKay Bridge; 44°39′45.2″N 63°37′22.1″W
- Major junctions: North Street - Macdonald Bridge; Cogswell Interchange
- South end: Foundry Lane, Inglis Street; 44°38′7.6″N 63°34′9.9″W

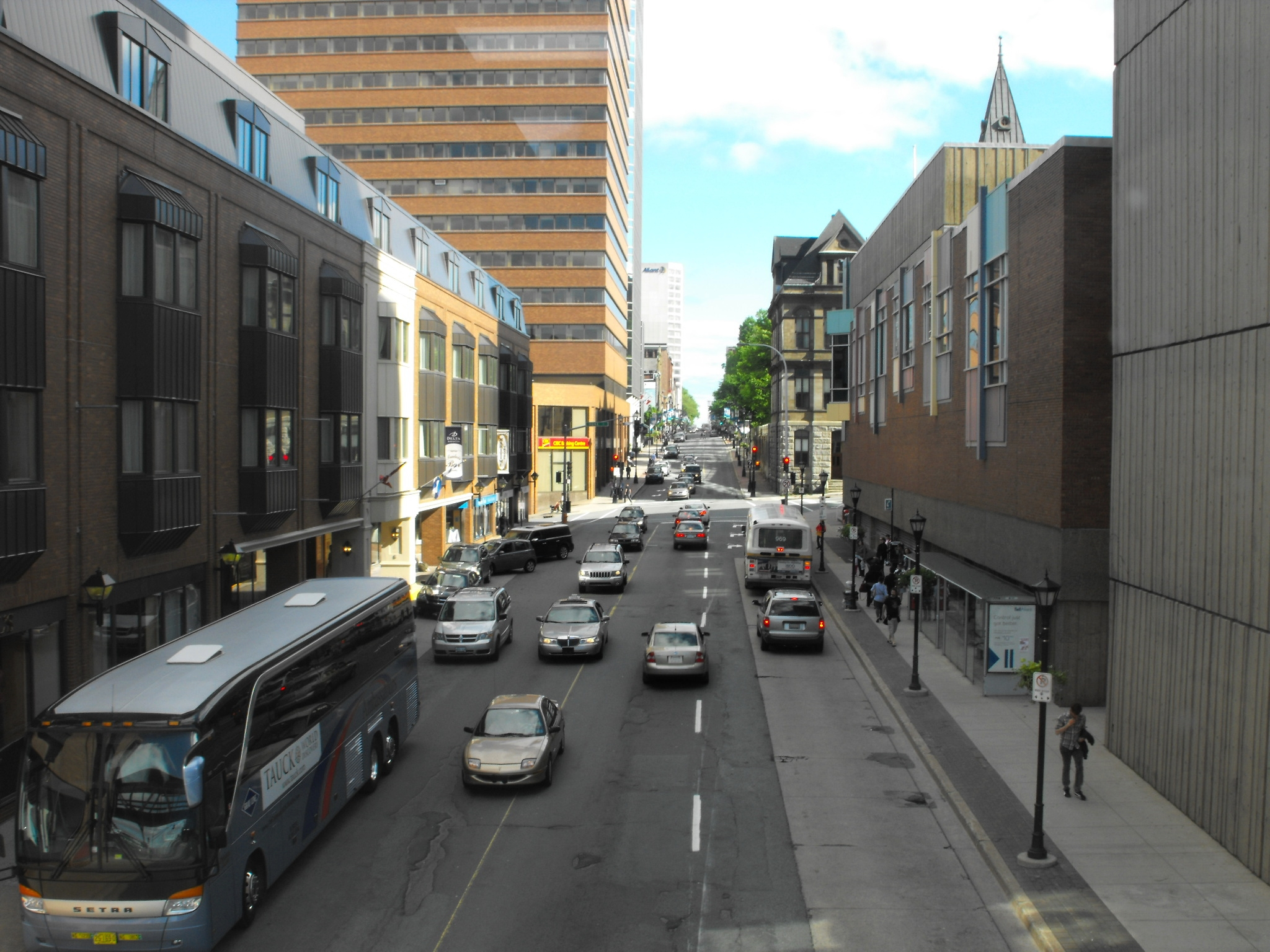
View southward on Barrington Street in 2009

Barrington Street is a major street in Halifax, Nova Scotia, Canada, running from the MacKay Bridge in the North End approximately 7 km south, through Downtown Halifax to Inglis Street in the South End. Its civic numbers range from 950 to 4756 on the Halifax Peninsula street grid numbering system.

Barrington Street is centrally located within the original Halifax street grid, laid out in the 18th century. It remains one of the main streets of the city and is home to numerous shops, office buildings, and the Halifax City Hall.

== History ==
Barrington Street is part of the original street grid laid out by engineer John Bruce and surveyor Charles Morris when Halifax was established as a British fortress. The streets were named after leading British statesmen, but the origin of the name Barrington Street is reportedly unclear. One account suggests the street is named after William Barrington, 2nd Viscount Barrington, who served as a Secretary of War but was an "unknown" in 1749 when Halifax was founded. Others say the street name is derived from a misspelling of the Earl of Harrington, the Secretary of State.

Barrington Street sits halfway up the slope to Citadel Hill and has long been a main street of Halifax. After the town's founding it became a fashionable street for promenading. In 1766 the eastern sidewalk was planked and became known as the "mall" until it fell into disrepair in the 1820s and was dismantled.

By the 19th century, Barrington Street was the main commercial district in Halifax. Horse-drawn streetcars began operating on Barrington Street in 1866. These were replaced by electric streetcars by 1896.

The street saw big changes in the mid-20th century, with massive demolition under the banner of urban renewal. A huge swath of the downtown area, north of Duke Street, was cleared for the development of Scotia Square and the Cogswell Interchange.

The Birk's Building at the George Street intersection, along with several adjacent smaller structures, were demolished in the early 1990s. This site is now under the ownership of the provincial government and remains one of the most prominent surface parking lots in the downtown core.

== Evolution ==
Today, Barrington Street stretches the length of the Halifax peninsula. However, the Barrington Street name originally only applied to the length of the street within downtown proper. South of Spring Garden Road, the street was called Pleasant Street. North of downtown (up to North Street), it was originally called Lockman Street. The remainder (everything north of North Street) was once called Campbell Road.

The area between downtown and the Angus L. Macdonald Bridge changed drastically in the 20th century. In order to serve the bridge, hundreds of properties were demolished in this area and this section of Barrington Street was partially converted into a limited-access highway. No shops front on this section of the street anymore.

The construction of the multi-level Cogswell Interchange in 1970 separated Barrington Street into two discontinuous sections; the street now interchanges with itself at this point. That is, a driver heading south toward downtown who exits Barrington at the Cogswell Interchange will wind up on the south section of Barrington Street. Continuing straight through the interchange, Barrington splits into Hollis Street and Lower Water Street. The Cogswell Interchange is slated to be demolished in the near future. In the current redevelopment plans, Barrington Street would form a continuous street once again.

== Intersections ==
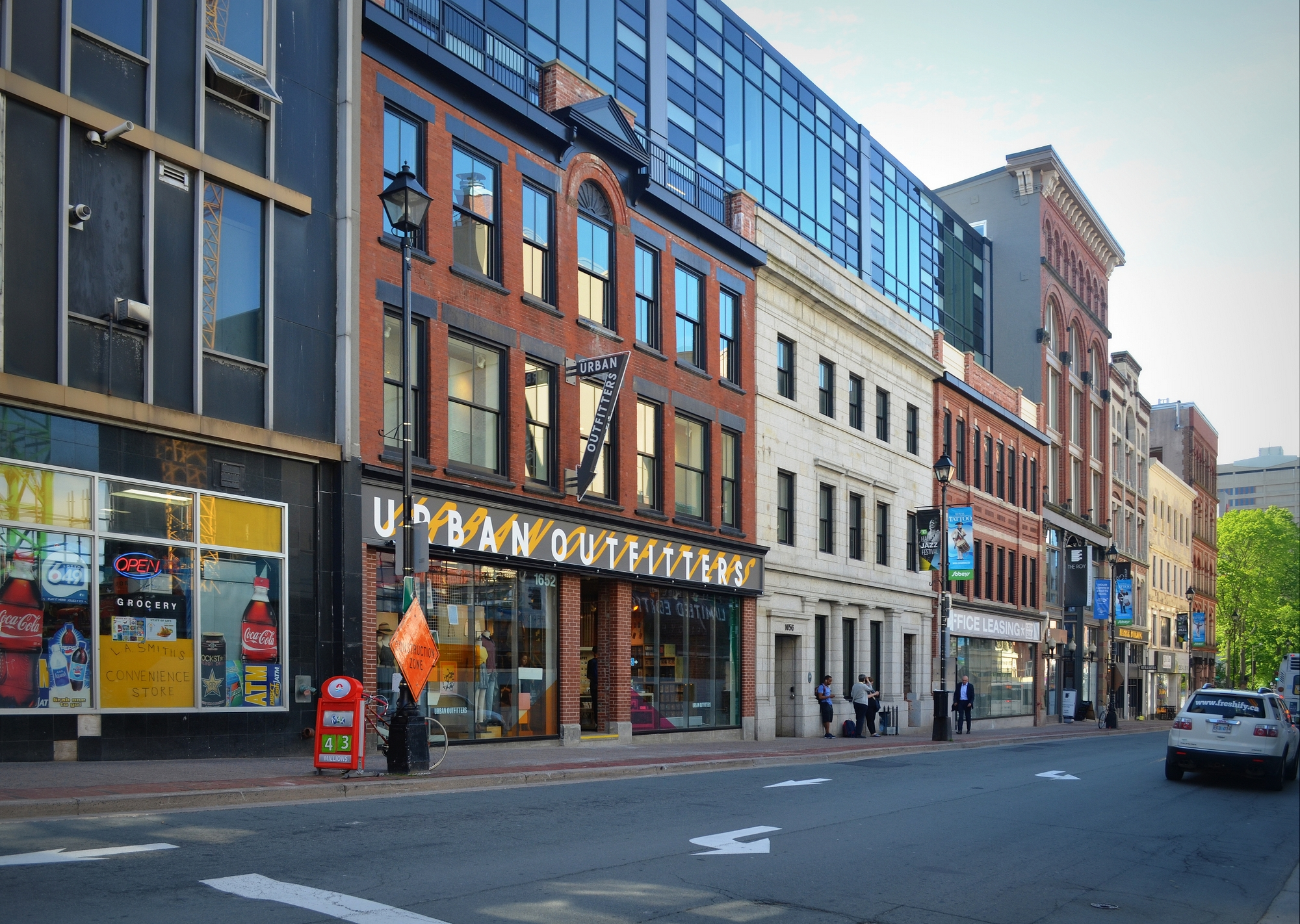
Barrington Street shops near Sackville Street

- Nova Scotia Highway 111
- Macdonald Bridge

== Notable places ==
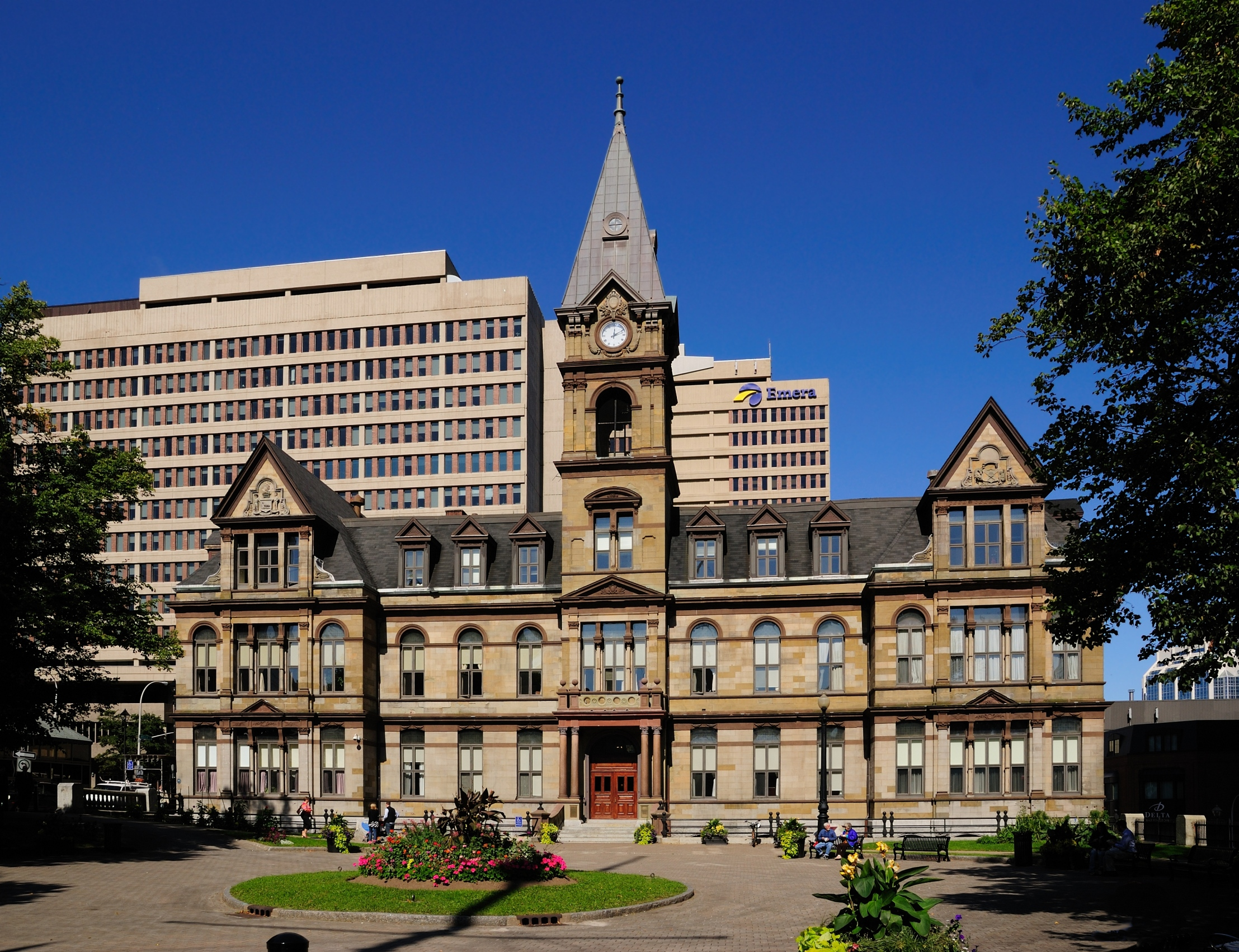
Halifax City Hall

=== North End ===
- CFB Halifax
- Cogswell Interchange
- Halifax Shipyard
- Mulgrave Park
- Richmond Terminals and railyard

=== Downtown ===
- Bank of Commerce Building
- The Book Room
- Dalhousie University Sexton Campus (former Technical University of Nova Scotia)
- Delta Hotel Barrington
- Freak Lunchbox
- Government House
- Grand Parade
- Granville Mall
- Halifax City Hall
- The Khyber
- Maritime Centre
- Province House
- Scotia Square
- St. Mary's Basilica
- St. Paul's Church
- TD Centre
