= Cogswell Interchange =

Highway structure in Halifax, Nova Scotia

Coordinates: 44°39′06″N 63°34′35″W

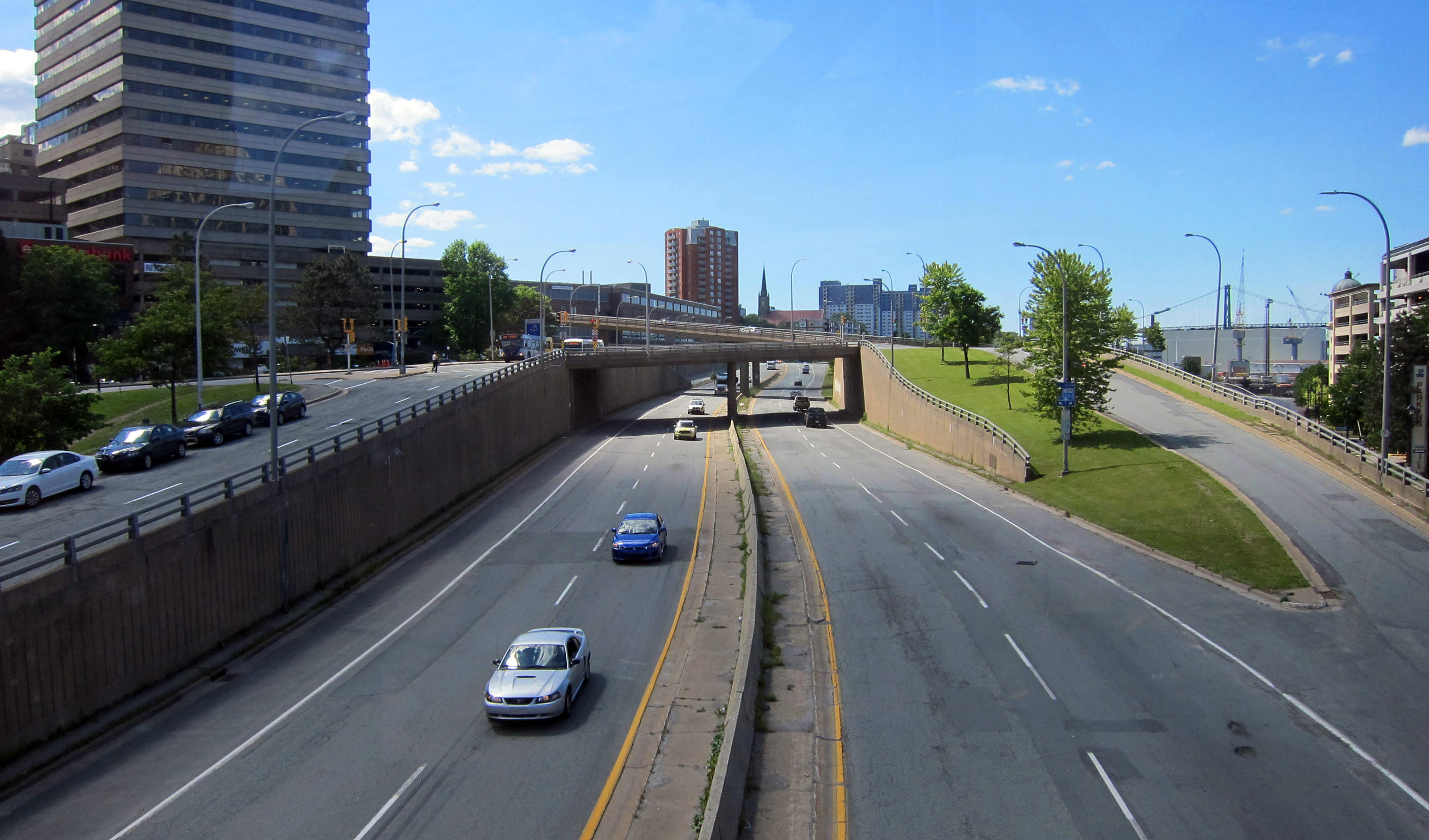
- General view (2016) prior to demolition
- Interactive map of Cogswell Interchange

Location
- Halifax, Nova Scotia
- Roads at junction: Barrington Street, Cogswell Street, Upper Water Street, Hollis Street

Construction
- Type: Multi-level interchange
- Spans: 3
- Constructed: 1969
- Opened: 1970
- Maintained by: Halifax Regional Municipality and Province of Nova Scotia

The Cogswell Interchange was a multi-level highway interchange in downtown Halifax, Nova Scotia, Canada. It was built in 1969-70 as the first stage of a greater scheme for an elevated freeway, called Harbour Drive, that would have demolished much of the downtown area. The Harbour Drive plan was halted by opposition, but the Cogswell Interchange remained a visible reminder, occupying a large amount of prime land and posing a barrier to pedestrian movement.

As the interchange became functionally obsolete and increasingly expensive to maintain, the municipal government decided to demolish the interchange and replace it with a more conventional street grid. Halifax Regional Council unanimously approved the 90 per cent design construction plan in February 2019 and directed staff to tender demolition and construction contracts for the redevelopment. Work began on the project in March 2022. The interchange was demolished in 2024. The newly renamed Cogswell District was largely completed by late 2025.

== Origins ==
The city began purchasing land and demolishing buildings in the 1950s in anticipation of the highway construction. In the 1960s, urban renewal planning was underway all over North America and Europe, and Halifax was no exception. In 1962, the city placed advertisements in newspapers seeking development proposals for the Central Redevelopment Area, an area of several city blocks worth of older wood-framed buildings. This eventually became Scotia Square, a complex of office, residential and hotel towers atop parking garages and a shopping mall.

The Cogswell Interchange is the concentrated area of streets in the top centre area of this map

The developers of Scotia Square, a project of a scale hitherto unattempted in the Maritimes, stressed the importance of improved transport infrastructure to the complex and commissioned a study recommending a conceptual precursor to "Harbour Drive", a proposed elevated freeway running parallel to the water, similar to the Gardiner Expressway in downtown Toronto.

A.D. Margison & Associates, successor to the firm which designed the Gardiner Expressway decades earlier, was hired by the city in 1967 to formally design the new highway and interchange. Opposition to the plan began to mount, led by the Nova Scotia Association of Architects with Allan F. Duffus at the helm. Many architects, engineers and planners spoke out against the destruction of the historic urban core and stated that it was not too late to build "simpler roads," which would require less demolition. Duffus produced an alternate plan, which A.D. Margison & Associates said would "overload the streets with traffic by 1970" and was rejected by city council, which feared that any changes to the interchange plan would jeopardise tenancy agreements made with respect to Scotia Square.

After demolition of the remaining buildings on the site, construction of the interchange began in 1969. It opened in 1970, the same year the municipal government recanted and cancelled construction of the remainder of Harbour Drive. It then cost $5.8 million.

== Demolition and redevelopment ==
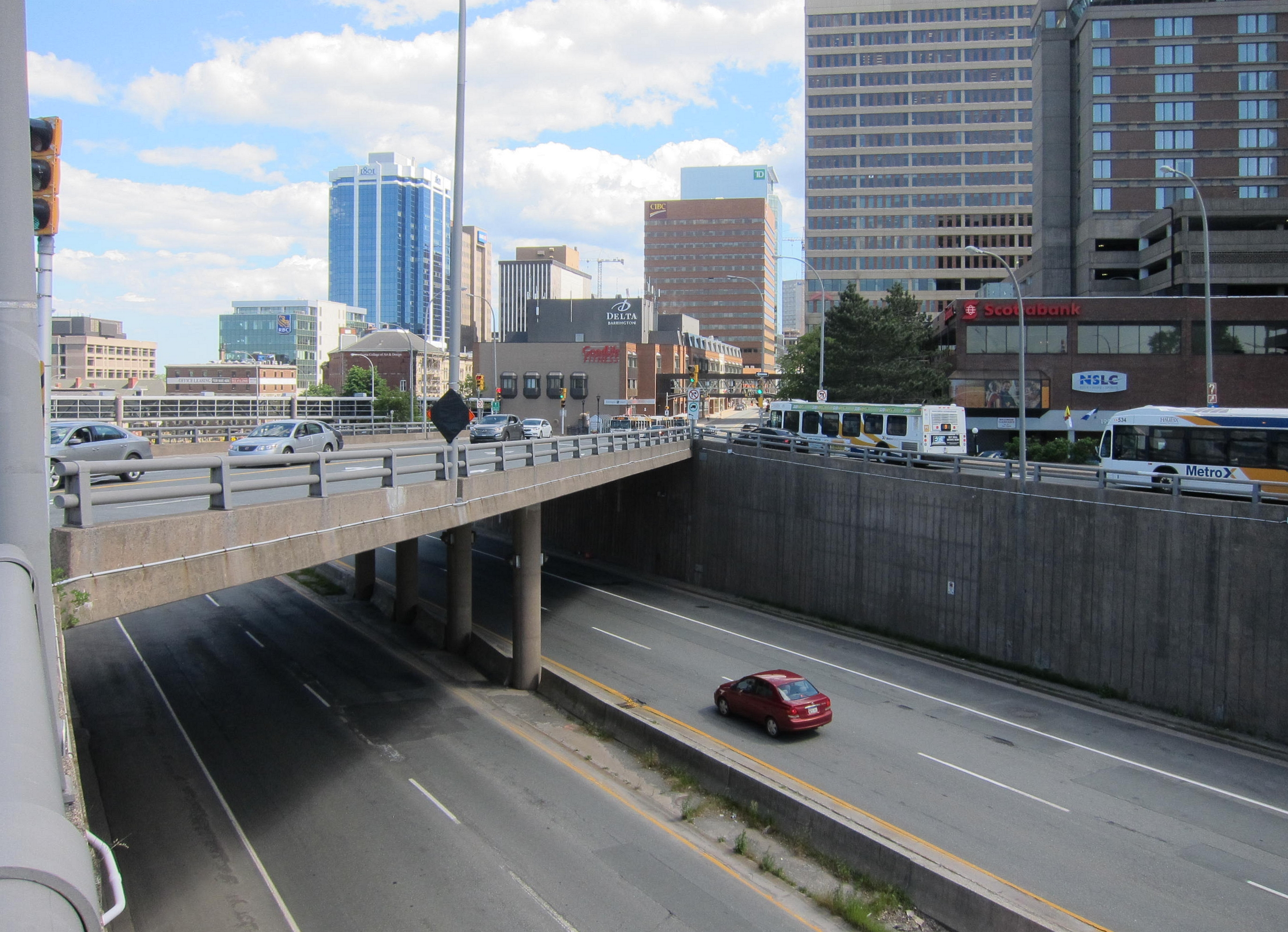
Cogswell Interchange next to Scotia Square, 2016

In the decades since construction, the interchange became a much-maligned feature of downtown Halifax. It was considered excessively large and pedestrian unfriendly. It separated downtown from the North End and the waterfront from the uphill areas.

Over the years there were several proposals for its demolition. The most current, the Cogswell Interchange Lands Plan, is being implemented.

The plan aims to offer quality urban design and promote economic development through a number of goals:

- reinstating a walkable, at-grade road system
- forming a new north gateway to downtown
- improving active transportation linkages
- reconnecting downtown to the North End
- increasing density to form a mixed-use neighbourhood downtown for living, working, and playing
- strengthen Barrington Street's position as the primary north–south street downtown (it was severed by the Cogswell Interchange)
- maintain visual connections to the harbour
- form viable lots for private development and economic growth
- provide a new transit hub

On September 20, 2016, the municipal government voted to hire a company to develop a plan for the interchange's removal and replacement by a more appropriate road network with the design work being carried out by WSP Group and several design consultants.

In February 2019, council approved the 90 per cent design plan and directed city staff to proceed with a tender for the demolition and redevelopment of the site.

As of September 2021, the tender to construct the new district was awarded. Demolition and subsequent construction began in 2022, and the project is expected to be complete in 2025. During the deconstruction, there will be approximately 16 acres (6.5 ha) of roadway removed and reverted to either built-up area or parkland. The total area of the site is about 98,407 m^{2} (1,059,240 sq ft), or approximately 9.8407 ha (24.317 acres).

A ceremony marking the commencement of the redevelopment project, hosted by Mayor Mike Savage, was held on 2 November 2021.

The interchange was demolished in 2024.

A public event was held in the new Granville Park on 17 September 2025 marking the "near completion" of the project. The project was substantially completed by the end of 2025, with only the construction of a water feature in Granville Park outstanding.

== Responsibility ==
The municipality and the province shared responsibility for maintenance of the bridge spans. The municipality was responsible for the road surfaces and the retaining walls.

== See also ==
- Highway revolts
