= Crombie REIT =

Canadian real estate investment trust

- Type: Public, REIT
- Traded as: TSX: CRR.UN; S&P/TSX Composite Component
- Industry: Real estate investment trust
- Founded: February 4, 1964
- Headquarters: New Glasgow, Nova Scotia
- Parent: Crombie REIT
- Website: crombie.ca/

Crombie REIT (formerly Atlantic Shopping Centres, then Crombie Properties) is a Canadian unincorporated open ended publicly traded real estate investment trust which trades on the Toronto Stock Exchange and has an estimated market capitalization of $1.6 billion. The company is based in New Glasgow, Nova Scotia.

== History ==
Crombie REIT was founded on February 4, 1964 as Atlantic Shopping Centres Limited. During the 1990s, the company merged with Halifax Developments Limited (known for Scotia Square), as well as Canadian Shopping Centres Limited. In the mid-2000s, the company was renamed as it expanded beyond both the Atlantic region as well as shopping centres.

It was converted in 2006 into an unincorporated open ended publicly traded real estate investment trust which trades on the Toronto Stock Exchange. Its largest unitholder is Empire Company Limited (ECL) which as of mid-2013 owned approximately 40% of the units in the REIT. ECL controls the Sobeys supermarket chain which is also the REIT's major tenant.

In January 2014, Crombie's commercial leasing division issued eviction notices to two local food vendors, Ray's Lebanese Cuisine and A Taste of India, in the Scotia Square food court in Halifax, Nova Scotia. A petition to save the two popular restaurants' leased tenancy was circulated in February and received over 5200 signatures. Many local patrons expressed anger and disappointment in Crombie's actions through social media. Ray's was the most longstanding eatery in the mall, having been operated by Ray Khattar for 31 years. He initially agreed to a doubling of his rent, from $5,000 to $10,000, but was then served an eviction notice regardless. Crombie was criticized for forcing out local businesses in favour of chain operations like McDonald's and Subway, having also evicted another popular eatery (PG's) in 2011 to make way for a bigger Tim Horton's. An article in The Coast lamented that Scotia Square's was the "best mall food court in the country, with interesting and varied local operations, and yet there seems to be a conscious effort to destroy that reputation."

In a follow-up news article, the CBC reported that Crombie had recanted and stated the businesses could stay; however, they demanded a doubling of the rent, a percentage of the sales, and a relocation of the outlets to a different part of the food court. While Ray's Lebanese Cuisine has left the Scotia Square food court, A Taste of India relocated to a new counter within the facility near their original spot.

In May 2024, Crombie REIT's holdings became caught up in an anti-competition violation complaint, by providing Canadian grocers undue influence over tenants and affecting Canadian grocery prices unfairly.
