= Barrington Tower =

Office building in Halifax, Nova Scotia

Coordinates: 44°39′0.77″N 63°34′32.72″W

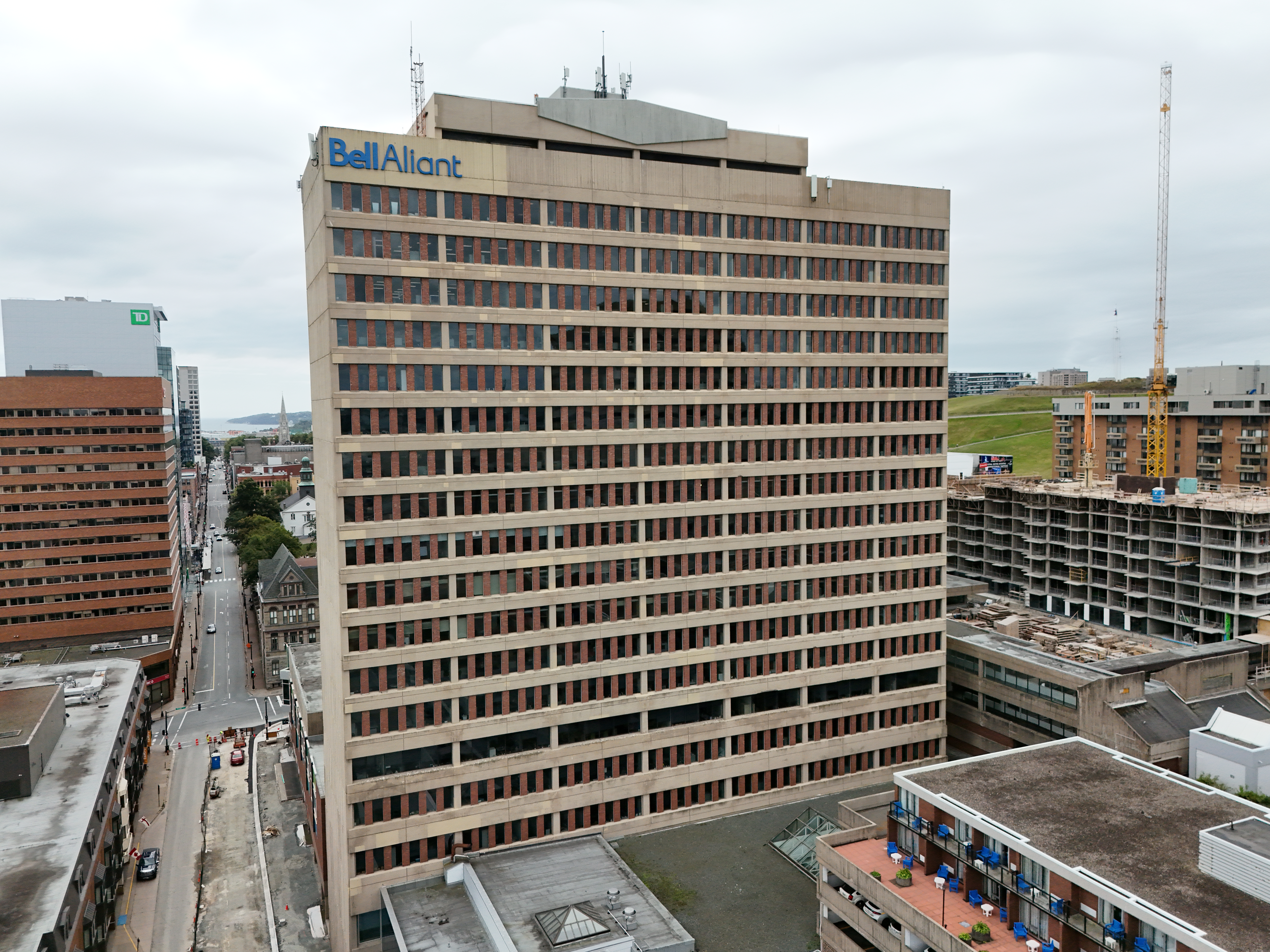
Barrington Tower in 2024

Barrington Tower is a part of the Scotia Square Complex in Downtown Halifax, Nova Scotia, Canada. The tower stands at 84 metres (275 feet) and has 20 floors. It is owned and operated by Crombie REIT.

The building is connected to the Downtown Halifax Link system.

== History ==
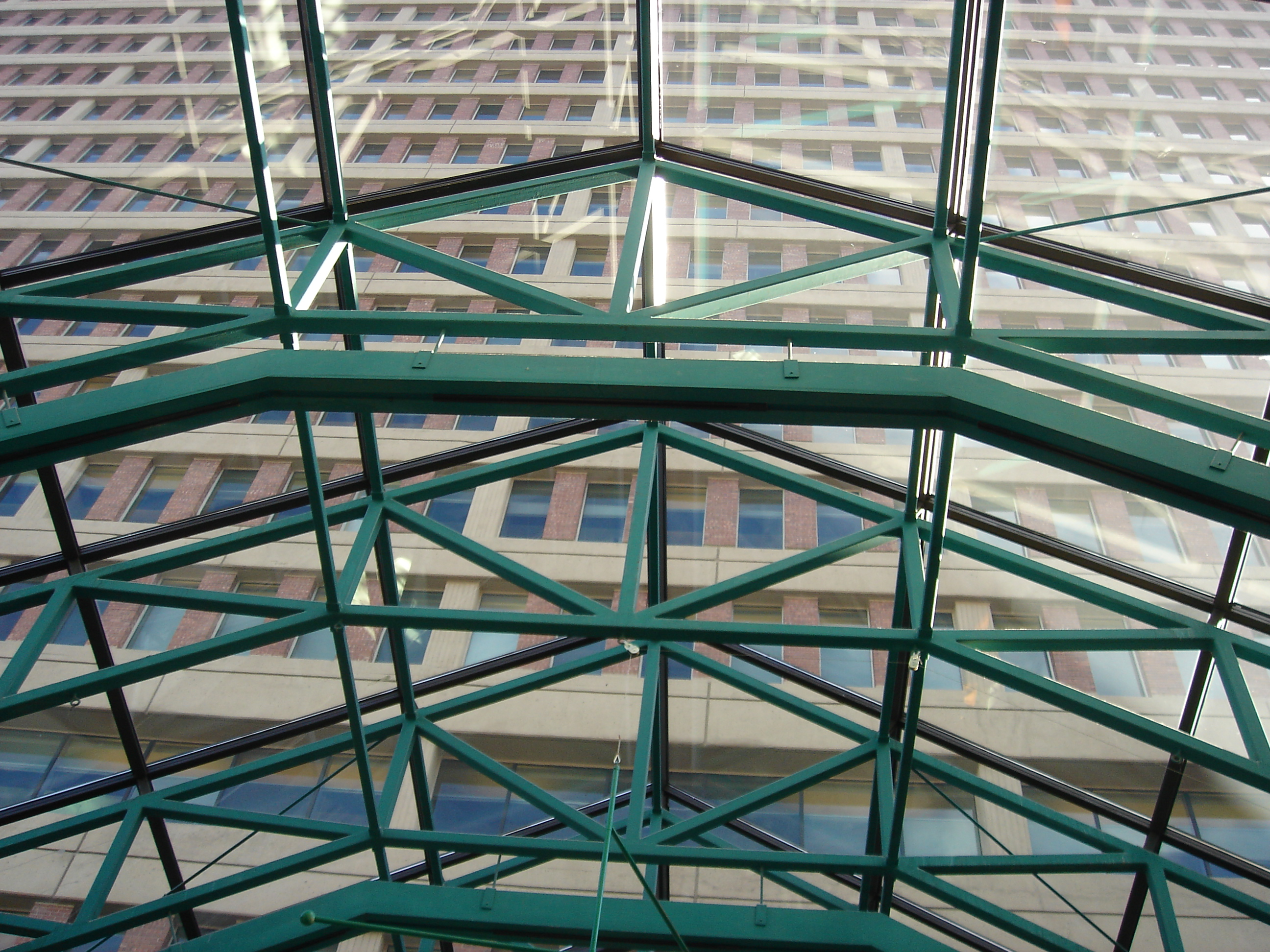
Barrington Tower from inside Scotia Square, looking up through a glass roof.

Barrington Tower was developed by Halifax Developments Limited as the second office tower of the Scotia Square development. The building was officially completed on 1 April 1971.

== Tenants ==
The tower is used for office and commercial space. It was formerly the home of Emera, owner of Nova Scotia Power, who relocated to a converted power plant on Lower Water Street in 2011.

Located in the lobby is a branch office for Medavie Blue Cross.

== Bike room facilities ==
Crombie REIT opened a bike room for tenant use in 2014. It is located in the loading bay below the ground floor of the tower with an entrance onto Barrington Street. The facilities feature lockers, showers, changing room, bicycle repair equipment and is secured via card access technology.

With the opening of this facility, Crombie REIT was named the "Most Cycling-friendly Landlord" 2014 by the Halifax Cycling Coalition.
