= Bank of Commerce (Halifax, Nova Scotia) =

Coordinates: 44°38′56.4″N 63°34′28.1″W

CIBC Building
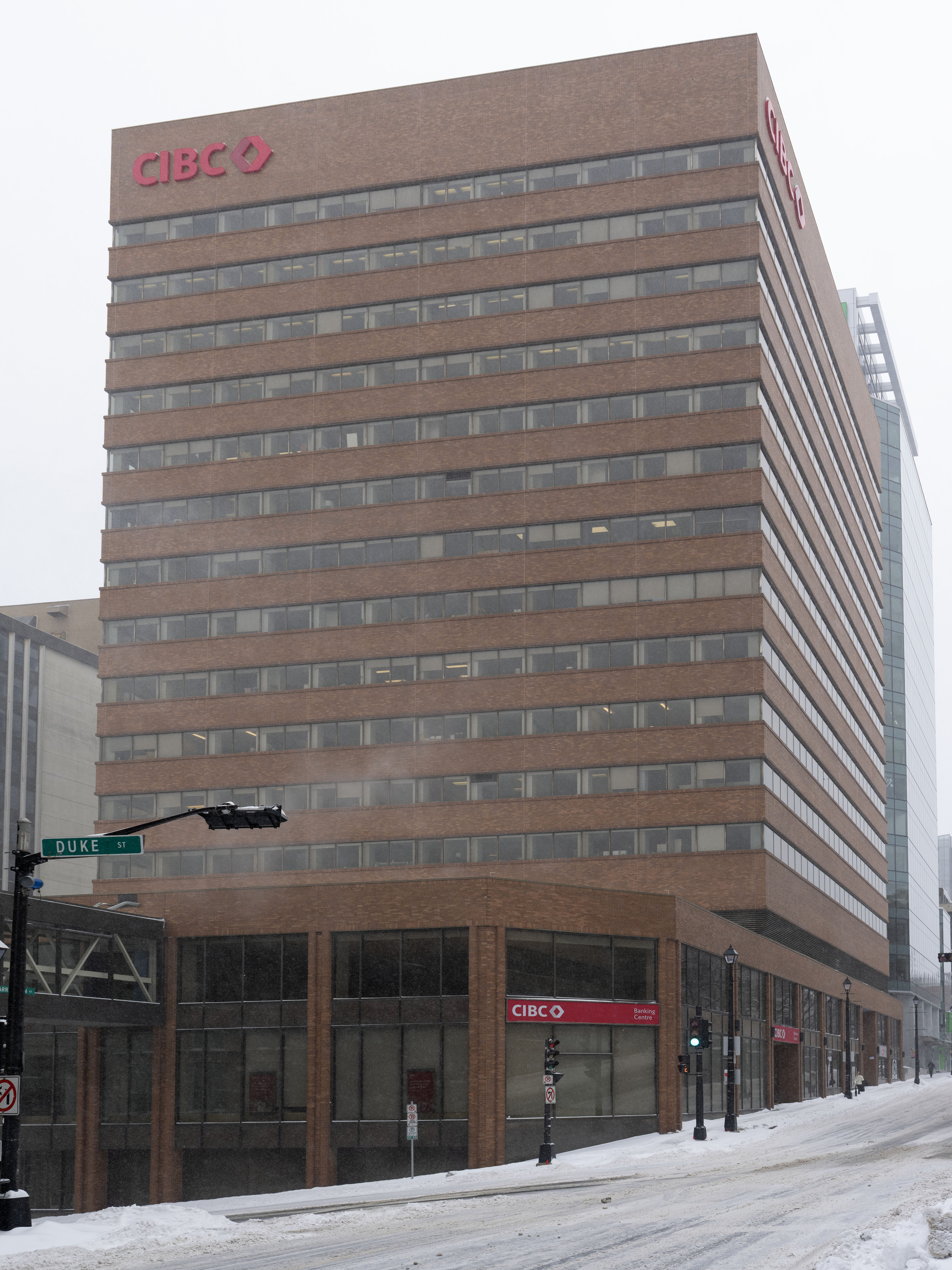

General information
- Status: Completed
- Type: Office building
- Architectural style: Modernism
- Location: 1809 Barrington Street; Halifax, Nova Scotia
- Completed: September 1977
- Owner: Crombie REIT

Design and construction
- Developer: Durham Leaseholds Limited
- Main contractor: Poole Construction

The Bank of Commerce Building, also known as the CIBC Building, is a high-rise office building in the downtown core of Halifax, Nova Scotia, Canada. It is located on Barrington Street and is owned and operated by Crombie REIT. The office tower stands at 66 metres and has 16 floors. It was completed in 1977. The building is connected to the Downtown Halifax Link system.

== History ==
The Bank of Commerce Tower, announced by the Canadian Imperial Bank of Commerce in 1975 as the bank's new Atlantic regional headquarters, was developed by Durham Leaseholds Limited, a joint venture between Oxford Development Group and Halifax Developments Limited. It was part of a development termed "Granville Place" during construction. Phase I of Granville Place became the Bank of Commerce Tower, while Phase II became the Delta Barrington Inn and Barrington Place Shops. These two buildings are linked by an enclosed footbridge spanning Duke Street.

The tower was built by Poole Construction. It opened in September 1977.

== Design ==
The building has a floor area of around 280,000 square feet (26,000 m^{2}).

== Ownership ==
The building is owned Crombie REIT and is located on land leased from the Canadian Imperial Bank of Commerce (CIBC). The land lease term ends on 31 December 2047.

== See also ==
- List of tallest buildings in Halifax, Nova Scotia
- TD Centre – located next door
