= Pedway =

Elevated or underground walkway

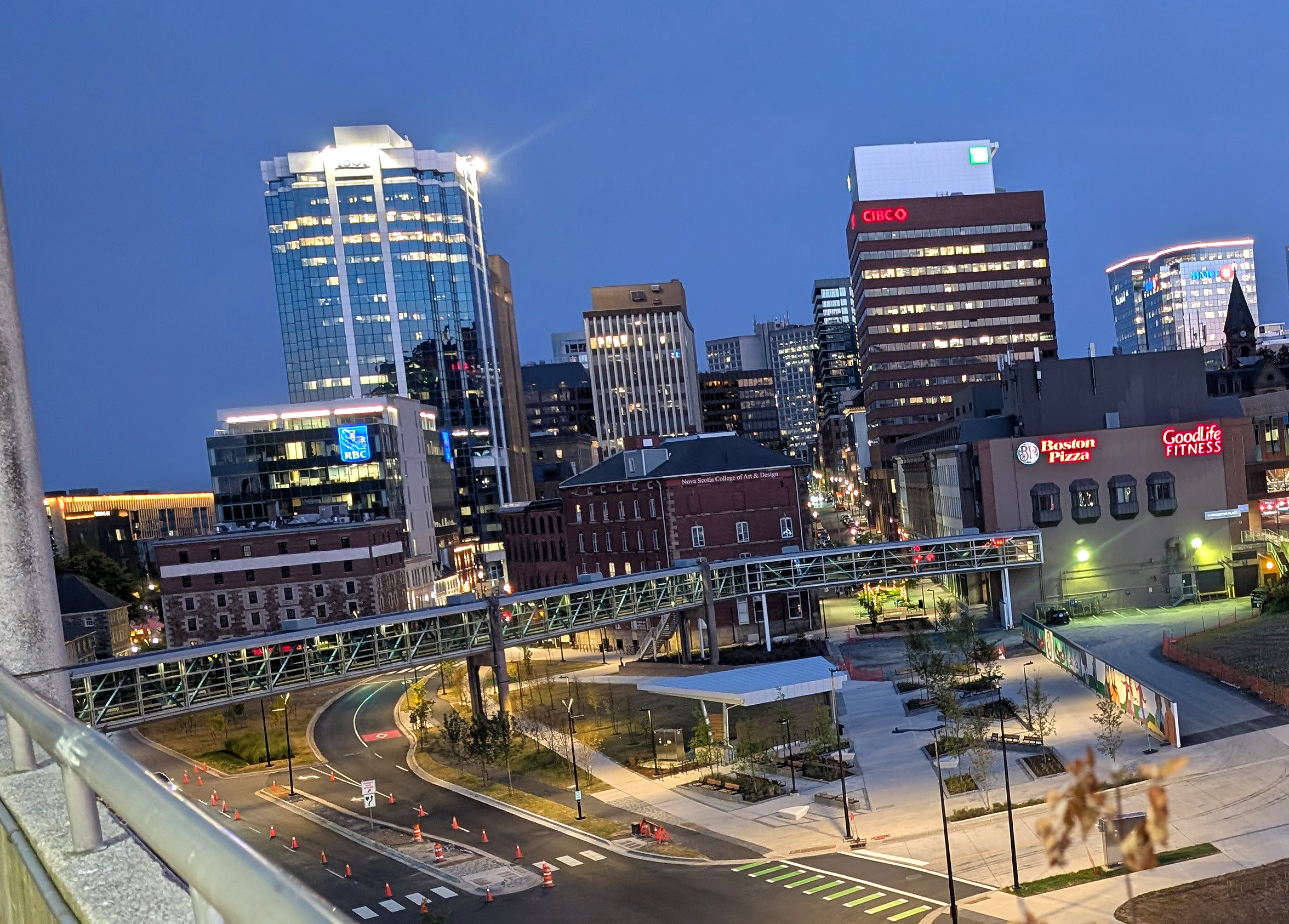
A pedway in Halifax, Nova Scotia, Canada

Pedways (short for pedestrian walkways) are elevated or underground walkways, often connecting urban high-rises to each other, other buildings, or the street. They provide quick and comfortable movement from building to building, away from traffic and inclement weather. Two of the largest networks of underground walkways are located in Canada, with RÉSO in Montreal and PATH in Toronto each consisting of approximately 30 kilometres (19 mi) of underground city-centre walkways.

== History ==
The concept of the elevated pedestrian way is credited to Antonio Sant'Elia, an Italian architect whose career was cut short by his death in World War One. He foresaw the city of the future as high rise tower blocks connected by elevated walkways at different levels.

== Examples ==
- Calgary Plus 15 Network (a.k.a. +15)
- Central Elevated Walkway, Hong Kong
- Chicago Pedway
- City of London Pedway Scheme
- Dallas Pedestrian Network
- Edmonton Pedway
- Halifax Link
- Houston tunnel system
- Minneapolis Skyway System
- Toronto PATH
- RÉSO, Montreal (a.k.a. Underground City)
- Winnipeg Walkway
- KLCC–Bukit Bintang Pedestrian Walkway, Kuala Lumpur

== See also ==
- Footbridge
- Footpath
- Overpass
- Pedestrian separation structure
- Pedestrian zone
- Pend
- Shad Thames
- Skyway
- Underground city
