= Halifax, Nova Scotia =

Canadian provincial capital

Halifax
- Regional municipality and provincial capital
- Halifax Regional Municipality
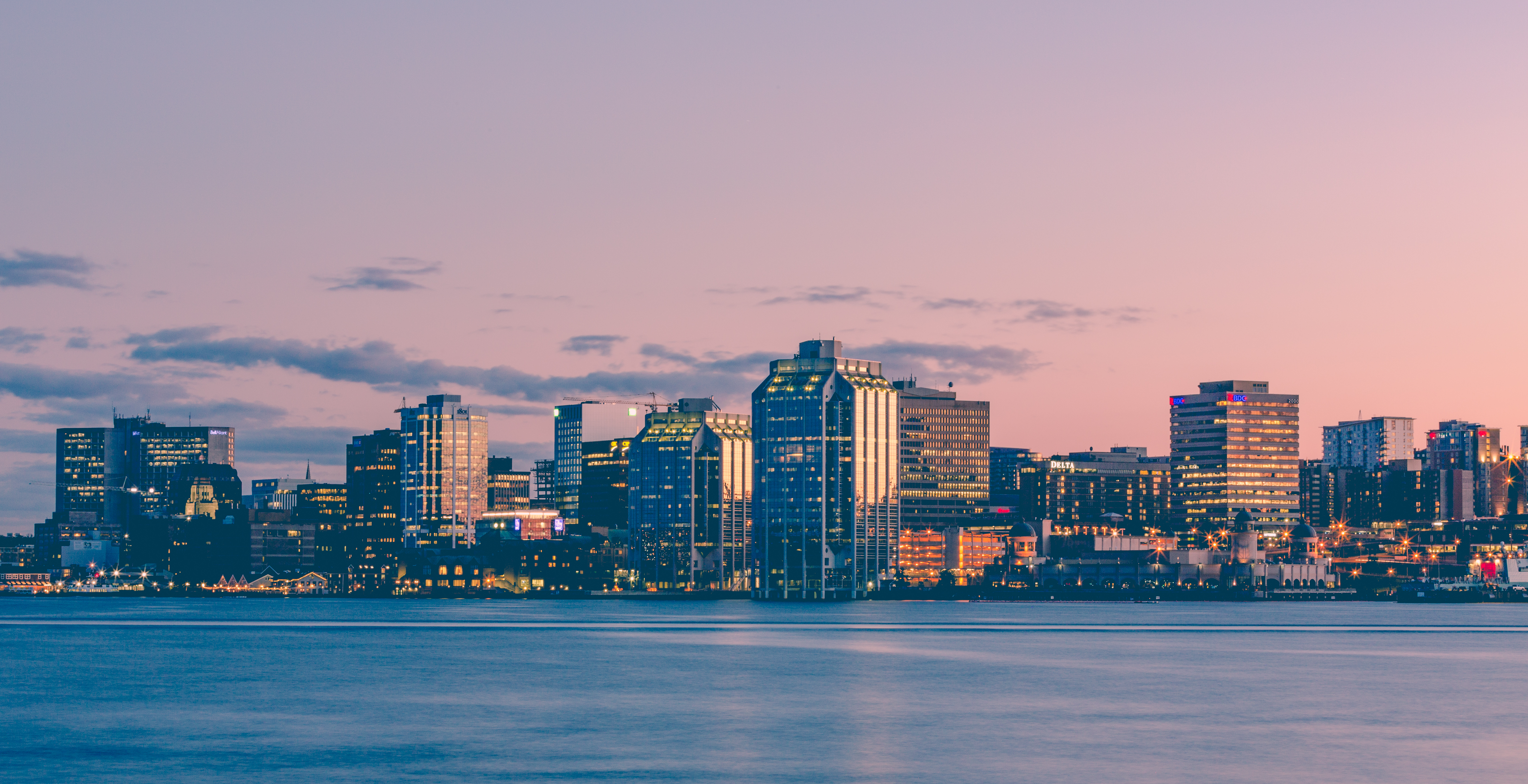
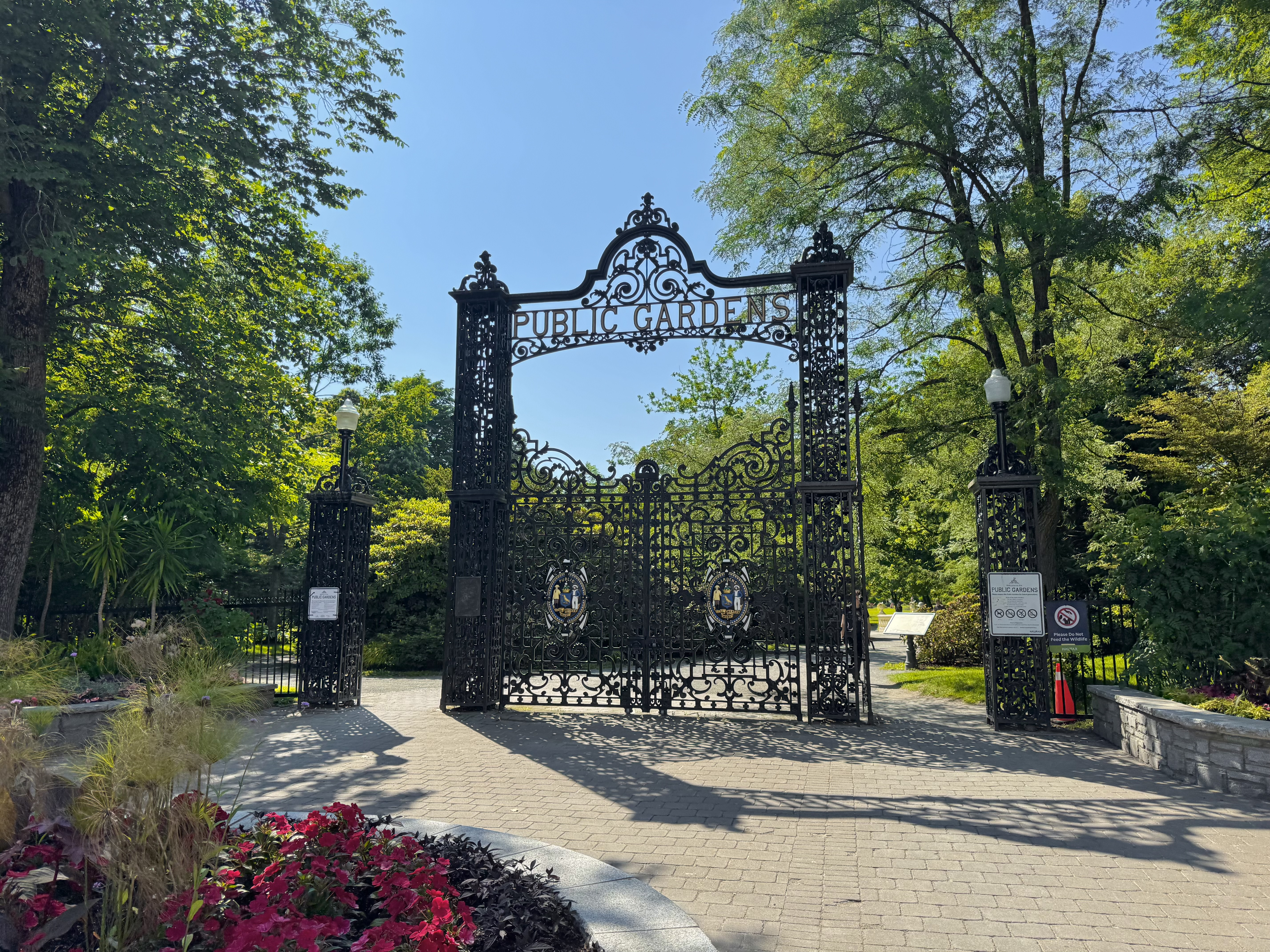
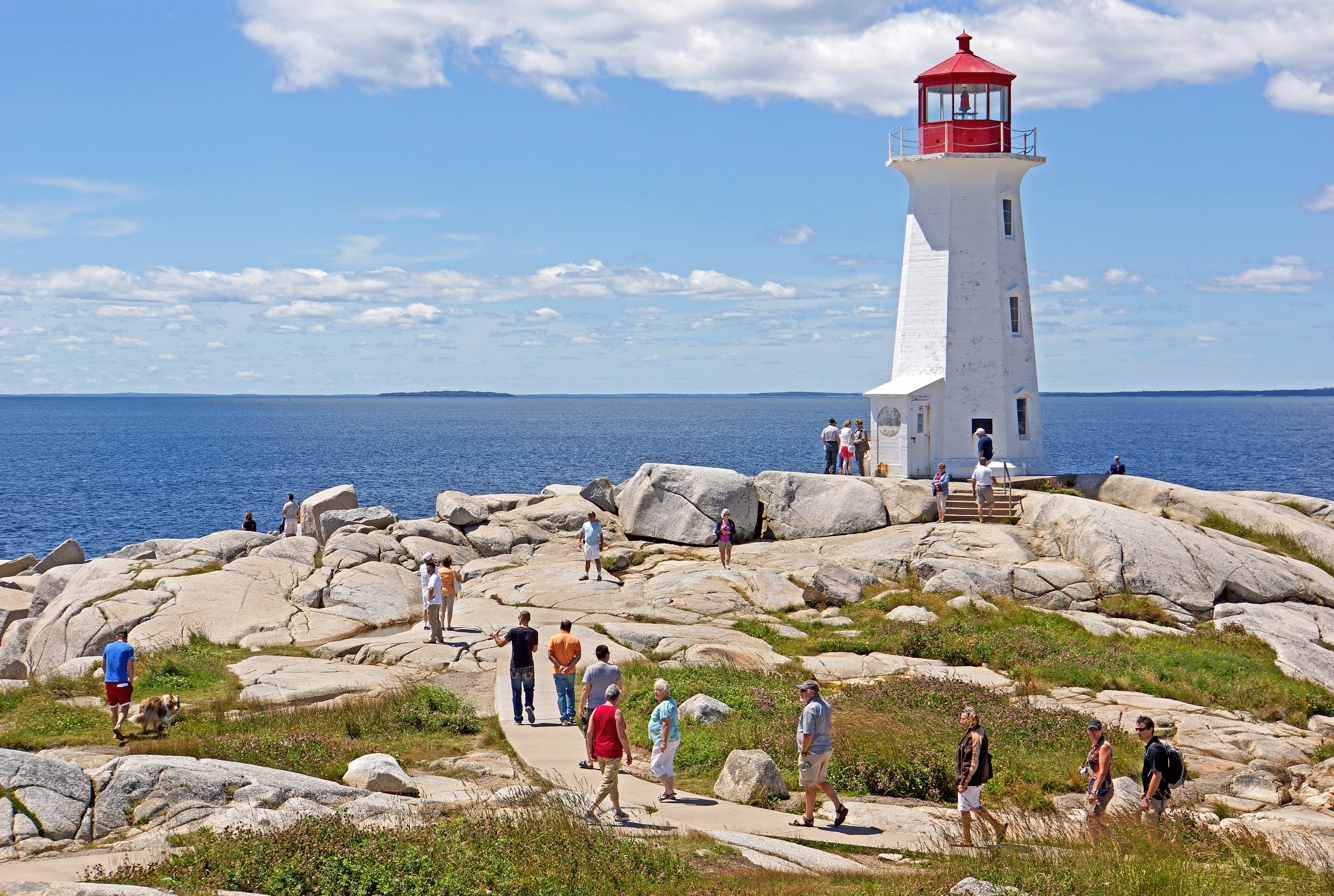
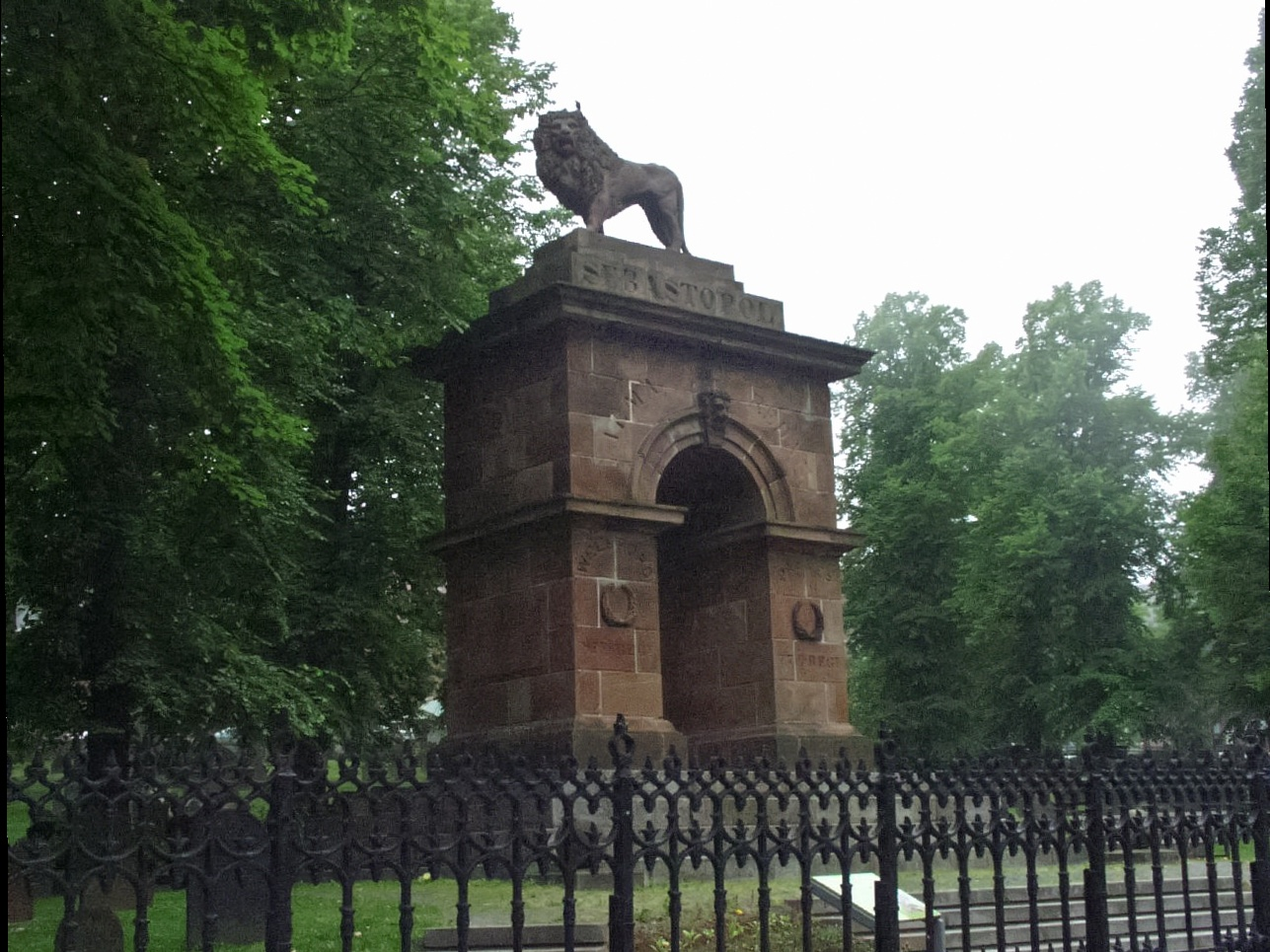
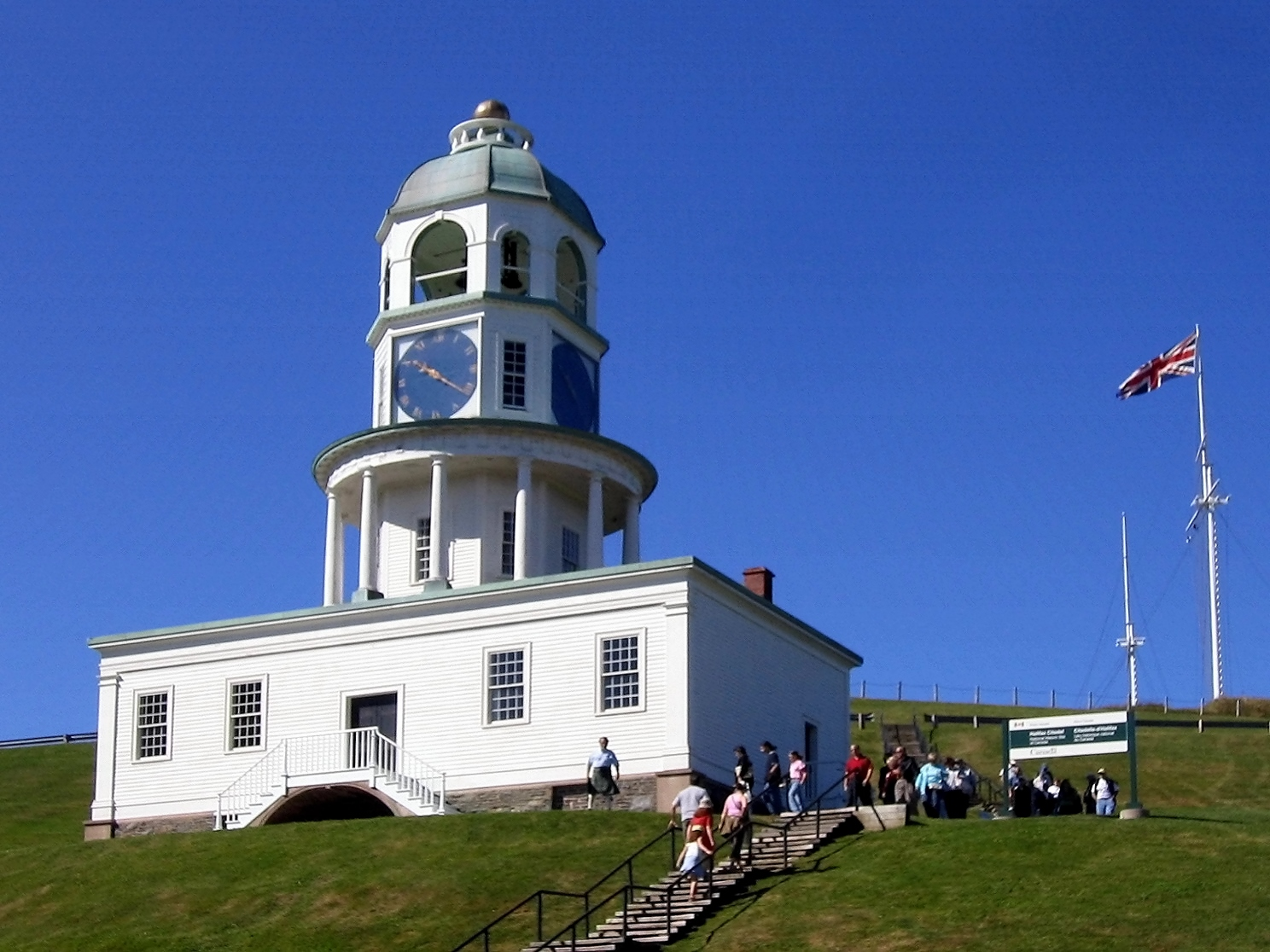
- Skyline of Downtown Halifax Wrought-iron gates to the Halifax Public Gardens Peggys Cove Entrance to the Old Burying Ground Halifax Town Clock on Citadel Hill

- Flag Coat of arms Logo
- Motto(s): "E Mari Merces" (Latin) "From the Sea, Wealth"
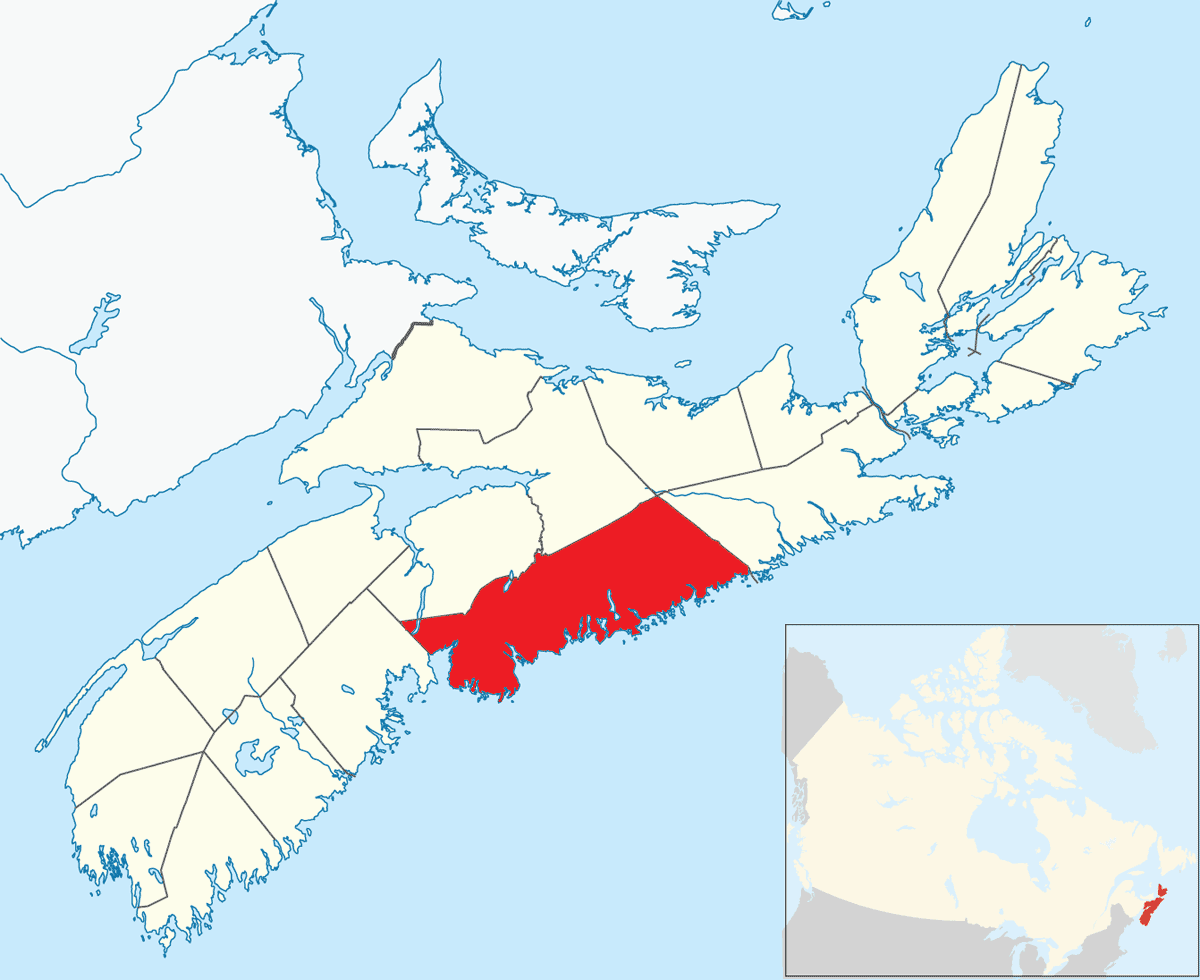
- Location in Nova Scotia

- Location in Canada
- Coordinates: 44°38′51″N 63°35′26″W
- Country: Canada
- Province: Nova Scotia
- Town: 1749
- City: 1841
- Regional municipality: April 1, 1996
- Named for: George Montagu-Dunk, 2nd Earl of Halifax

Government
  - Type: Regional municipality
  - Mayor: Andy Fillmore
  - Governing body: Halifax Regional Council
  - MPs: List of MPs: Braedon Clark (LPC); Lena Diab (LPC); Jessica Fancy-Landry (LPC); Darren Fisher (LPC); Sean Fraser (LPC); Shannon Miedema (LPC)
  - MLAs: List of MLAs: Barbara Adams; Patricia Arab; Gary Burrill; Claudia Chender; Keith Colwell; Lena Diab; Rafah DiCostanzo; Tim Halman; Larry Harrison; Bill Horne; Tony Ince; Ben Jessome; Brad Johns; Labi Kousoulis; Susan Leblanc; Brendan Maguire; Kevin Murphy; Iain Rankin; Kelly Regan; Lisa Roberts; Dave Wilson

Area
  - Regional municipality: 5,475.57 km^{2} (2,114.13 sq mi)
  - Urban: 238.29 km^{2} (92.00 sq mi)
  - Metro: 7,276.22 km^{2} (2,809.36 sq mi)
- Highest elevation: 241.9 m (793.6 ft)
- Lowest elevation: 0 m (0 ft)

Population (2021)
  - Regional municipality: 439,819 (13th)
  - Density: 80.3/km^{2} (208/sq mi)
  - Urban: 348,634
  - Urban density: 1,463.1/km^{2} (3,789/sq mi)
  - Metro: 465,703 (12th)
  - Metro density: 64/km^{2} (170/sq mi)
  - Change 2016–2021: ▲9.1%
  - Census ranking: 13 of 5,162
- Demonym: Haligonian

Gross Metropolitan Product
  - Halifax CMA: CA$24.4 billion (2020)
- Time zone: UTC−04:00 (AST)
  - Summer (DST): UTC−03:00 (ADT)
- Postal code span: B0J, B3A to B4G
- Area codes: 902, 782
- Website: www.halifax.ca

Halifax, officially the Halifax Regional Municipality (HRM), is the capital and most populous municipality of the Canadian province of Nova Scotia, and the most populous municipality in Atlantic Canada. It consists of four former municipalities that were amalgamated in 1996: Halifax, Dartmouth, Bedford, and Halifax County.

Halifax is an economic centre of Atlantic Canada, home to a concentration of government offices and private companies. Major employers include the Department of National Defence, Dalhousie University, Nova Scotia Health Authority, Saint Mary's University, the Halifax Shipyard, various levels of government, and the Port of Halifax. Resource industries found in rural areas of the municipality include agriculture, fishing, mining, forestry, and natural gas extraction. As of July 1, 2025, the population of the Halifax census metropolitan area was estimated at 544,834. In the 2021 census, 348,634 people lived in the municipality's urban area.

== Etymology ==
The area was called "Chebucto" until Halifax was established by Governor Edward Cornwallis in 1749, named in honour of George Montagu-Dunk, 2nd Earl of Halifax. The Mi'kmaq name for the harbour around which Halifax exists is K'jipuktuk or Chebookt, (Note: Also rendered as "Chebooktook") meaning "Chief Harbour" or "Great Harbour" in the Mi'kmaq language. Additionally, the Mi'kmaq referred to the area of the Halifax Peninsula comprising the downtown area and Point Pleasant Park as Amntu'kati, while the hillside where Halifax was established was referred to as "Goo-ow-ak-a-de" according to Thomas Raddall, meaning "place of many pines".

== History ==
The founding of Halifax in 1749

Before 1749, when a British colonial settlement was established at Halifax, the Colony of Nova Scotia had been administered from Annapolis Royal, near the Western opening of the Bay of Fundy. However, in 1749, King George II ordered Edward Cornwallis to establish Halifax as a new capital. Equipped with 13 transports and a sloop of war, Cornwallis founded the Town of Halifax on what is now known as the Halifax Peninsula, on June 21, 1749.

The establishment of Halifax marked the beginning of Father Le Loutre's War, as the Mi'kmaq viewed it as violating a treaty they signed with British colonial authorities in 1727 following the end of Father Rale's War. Cornwallis brought along 1,176 settlers and their families. To protect the new Protestant settlements from Mi'kmaq, Acadian, and French attacks, British fortifications were erected in Halifax (Citadel Hill, 1749), Bedford (Fort Sackville, 1749), Dartmouth (1750), and Lawrencetown (1754), all areas within the modern-day Municipality.

The community of St. Margaret's Bay, also in the Municipality, was first settled by French-speaking Foreign Protestants at French Village, Nova Scotia, who migrated from Lunenburg, Nova Scotia, during the American Revolution. In the 18th and 19th centuries, Halifax grew to become a centre of government (particularly military), trade, and shipbuilding. The completion of the Intercolonial Railway in 1876 helped make Halifax a major gateway for Atlantic trade—particularly in winter, when ice made ports on the St. Lawrence River inaccessible.

This connection to trans-Atlantic trade and military enterprises bore deadly consequences on December 6, 1917. In one of the great disasters in Canadian history, the SS Mont-Blanc, a French cargo ship carrying munitions, collided with the Belgian Relief vessel SS Imo in "The Narrows" between upper Halifax Harbour and Bedford Basin. The resulting Halifax Explosion devastated the Richmond District in the North End of Halifax, killing about 2,000 people and injuring nearly 9,000 others. The blast was the largest artificial explosion before the development of nuclear weapons. Aid came from Boston, strengthening the bond between the two coastal cities.

In addition to the capital City of Halifax (on the western side of the harbour), the City of Dartmouth (eastern side) and the Town of Bedford (northern tip of the Bedford Basin) grew up through the 19th and 20th centuries. Halifax County was originally understood as a higher-level geographic unit responsible for, among other things, court services throughout both the incorporated Cities and Town, and the unorganized territory of the remainder of the county. However, by the mid-20th century, this structure had evolved such that "the County" was a distinct municipality including only the areas that were not included within the Cities and Town.

These four municipalities (City of Halifax, City of Dartmouth, Town of Bedford, Halifax County) coordinated delivery of some services through a body known as the Metropolitan Authority starting in the late 1970s, but remained independent municipal bodies until April 1, 1996, when the provincial government amalgamated all municipal governments within Halifax County to create the Halifax Regional Municipality. Thus, the modern municipal boundary now includes all of Halifax County except for several Mi'kmaq reserves.

Since amalgamation, the region has officially been known as the Halifax Regional Municipality (HRM), but "Halifax" has remained in common usage for brevity. In April 2014, the Regional Council approved a new brand identity for the region, under which the name "Halifax" is used for marketing and communications purposes; "Halifax Regional Municipality" remains the region's official name.

== Geography ==
=== Climate ===
Halifax has a humid continental climate (Köppen Dfb), with warm summers and relatively mild winters, which is due to Gulf Stream moderation. The weather is usually milder in the winter or cooler in the summer than areas at similar latitudes inland, with the temperature remaining (with occasional notable exceptions) between about −8 and 28 °C (18 and 82 °F). January is the coldest month, being the only month with a high that is slightly below freezing at −0.1 °C (31.8 °F), while August is the warmest. The sea heavily influences the climate of the area, causing significant seasonal lag in summer, with August being significantly warmer than June and with September being the third mildest month in terms of mean temperature.

Hurricane Juan, a category 2 storm, hit in September 2003 and caused considerable damage to the region. Hurricane Earl grazed the coast as a category 1 storm in 2010. In 2019, Hurricane Dorian made landfall just south of Halifax as a post-tropical storm with an intensity equivalent to a category 2 hurricane and caused significant damage across Nova Scotia. In 2021 Hurricane Ida hit the region with minor damage. In 2022, Hurricane Fiona hit as a category 2 storm, although damage was relatively minor in Halifax, with downed trees and widespread power outages for days.

The highest temperature ever recorded in Halifax was 37.2 °C (99.0 °F) on July 10, 1912, and the lowest temperature recorded was −29.4 °C (−20.9 °F) on February 18, 1922. In spite of the possibility of high temperatures, in a normal year there are only three days that go above 30 °C (86 °F). Halifax also has a modest frost count by Canadian standards due to the maritime influence, averaging 131 air frosts and 49 full days below freezing annually. On average the frost-free period is 182 days, ranging from May 1 to October 31.

Climate data for Halifax (Citadel Hill) Climate ID: 8202220; coordinates 44°39′N 63°35′W; elevation: 70.1 m (230 ft); 1981–2010 normals, extremes 1863–present (Note: Based on station coordinates provided by Environment Canada and documentation from the Nova Scotian Institute of Science, weather data was collected in West End, Halifax from January 1863 to July 1933, at Citadel Hill from August 1933 to August 1939, at Downtown Halifax from September 1939 to July 1974, at Citadel Hill from August 1974 to January 2002 and at CFB Halifax (Windsor Park and Halifax Dockyard) from September 2004 to present.)
Month	Jan	Feb	Mar	Apr	May	Jun	Jul	Aug	Sep	Oct	Nov	Dec	Year
Record high °C (°F)	14.0 (57.2)	16.0 (60.8)	28.2 (82.8)	28.3 (82.9)	33.3 (91.9)	35.3 (95.5)	37.2 (99.0)	34.4 (93.9)	34.6 (94.3)	31.1 (88.0)	23.3 (73.9)	16.7 (62.1)	37.2 (99.0)
Mean daily maximum °C (°F)	−0.1 (31.8)	0.4 (32.7)	3.6 (38.5)	8.7 (47.7)	14.4 (57.9)	19.6 (67.3)	23.1 (73.6)	23.1 (73.6)	19.3 (66.7)	13.4 (56.1)	8.1 (46.6)	2.8 (37.0)	11.4 (52.5)
Daily mean °C (°F)	−4.1 (24.6)	−3.6 (25.5)	−0.2 (31.6)	4.9 (40.8)	10.1 (50.2)	15.2 (59.4)	18.8 (65.8)	19.1 (66.4)	15.5 (59.9)	9.9 (49.8)	4.8 (40.6)	−0.8 (30.6)	7.5 (45.5)
Mean daily minimum °C (°F)	−8.2 (17.2)	−7.5 (18.5)	−3.9 (25.0)	1.0 (33.8)	5.8 (42.4)	10.7 (51.3)	14.4 (57.9)	15.1 (59.2)	11.8 (53.2)	6.4 (43.5)	1.5 (34.7)	−4.3 (24.3)	3.6 (38.5)
Record low °C (°F)	−27.2 (−17.0)	−29.4 (−20.9)	−23.3 (−9.9)	−13.9 (7.0)	−5.0 (23.0)	0.0 (32.0)	4.4 (39.9)	3.9 (39.0)	−1.7 (28.9)	−7.2 (19.0)	−15.6 (3.9)	−25.6 (−14.1)	−29.4 (−20.9)
Average precipitation mm (inches)	139.7 (5.50)	110.1 (4.33)	132.5 (5.22)	118.3 (4.66)	119.1 (4.69)	111.8 (4.40)	110.3 (4.34)	96.4 (3.80)	108.9 (4.29)	124.3 (4.89)	151.4 (5.96)	145.1 (5.71)	1,468.1 (57.80)
Average rainfall mm (inches)	96.7 (3.81)	75.1 (2.96)	101.3 (3.99)	111.3 (4.38)	118.4 (4.66)	111.8 (4.40)	110.3 (4.34)	96.4 (3.80)	108.9 (4.29)	124.1 (4.89)	143.6 (5.65)	115.9 (4.56)	1,313.9 (51.73)
Average snowfall cm (inches)	43.1 (17.0)	35.0 (13.8)	31.2 (12.3)	7.0 (2.8)	0.8 (0.3)	0.0 (0.0)	0.0 (0.0)	0.0 (0.0)	0.0 (0.0)	0.1 (0.0)	7.8 (3.1)	29.2 (11.5)	154.2 (60.7)
Average precipitation days (≥ 0.2 mm)	13.8	11.6	13.1	15.2	15.8	13.6	12.1	11.1	11.7	14.1	15.3	14.5	161.8
Average rainy days (≥ 0.2 mm)	8.5	6.5	10.2	14.1	15.7	13.6	12.1	11.1	11.7	14.1	14.5	10.8	142.7
Average snowy days (≥ 0.2 cm)	6.8	6.1	4.1	1.6	0.2	0.0	0.0	0.0	0.0	0.1	1.2	5.2	25.3
Mean monthly sunshine hours	109.5	127.2	142.8	156.6	193.3	220.7	235.2	226.6	180.5	157.8	107.4	105.2	1,962.5
Percentage possible sunshine	38.2	43.3	38.7	38.8	42.1	47.5	49.9	52.1	47.9	46.2	37.2	38.2	43.3
Average ultraviolet index	1	2	3	5	6	8	8	7	5	3	2	1	4
Source 1: Environment and Climate Change Canada (Sunshine data recorded at CFB Shearwater)
Source 2: Nova Scotian Institute of Science and Weather Atlas

Climate data for Halifax Stanfield International Airport WMO ID: 71395; coordinates 44°52′48″N 63°30′00″W; elevation: 145.4 m (477 ft); 1991−2020 normals, extremes 1953−present
Month	Jan	Feb	Mar	Apr	May	Jun	Jul	Aug	Sep	Oct	Nov	Dec	Year
Record high humidex	18.8	18.3	29.3	32.1	36.0	42.0	42.4	41.9	42.1	33.0	25.4	20.9	42.4
Record high °C (°F)	14.8 (58.6)	17.5 (63.5)	27.2 (81.0)	29.5 (85.1)	32.8 (91.0)	34.3 (93.7)	33.9 (93.0)	35.0 (95.0)	34.2 (93.6)	29.4 (84.9)	21.5 (70.7)	16.6 (61.9)	35.0 (95.0)
Mean maximum °C (°F)	9.6 (49.3)	9.0 (48.2)	12.3 (54.1)	17.7 (63.9)	24.2 (75.6)	28.0 (82.4)	29.5 (85.1)	29.0 (84.2)	26.7 (80.1)	21.5 (70.7)	16.4 (61.5)	12.3 (54.1)	31.0 (87.8)
Mean daily maximum °C (°F)	−1.2 (29.8)	−0.6 (30.9)	3.5 (38.3)	9.2 (48.6)	15.5 (59.9)	20.5 (68.9)	24.2 (75.6)	24.2 (75.6)	20.0 (68.0)	13.7 (56.7)	7.6 (45.7)	2.1 (35.8)	11.6 (52.9)
Daily mean °C (°F)	−5.7 (21.7)	−5.2 (22.6)	−0.9 (30.4)	4.5 (40.1)	10.1 (50.2)	15.2 (59.4)	19.2 (66.6)	19.2 (66.6)	15.2 (59.4)	9.2 (48.6)	3.8 (38.8)	−1.9 (28.6)	6.9 (44.4)
Mean daily minimum °C (°F)	−10.1 (13.8)	−9.7 (14.5)	−5.4 (22.3)	−0.3 (31.5)	4.6 (40.3)	9.8 (49.6)	14.2 (57.6)	14.1 (57.4)	10.2 (50.4)	4.7 (40.5)	0.0 (32.0)	−5.8 (21.6)	2.2 (36.0)
Mean minimum °C (°F)	−17.9 (−0.2)	−17.4 (0.7)	−12.8 (9.0)	−4.9 (23.2)	0.6 (33.1)	5.3 (41.5)	10.5 (50.9)	10.3 (50.5)	5.0 (41.0)	−0.3 (31.5)	−6.2 (20.8)	−12.9 (8.8)	−19.2 (−2.6)
Record low °C (°F)	−28.5 (−19.3)	−27.3 (−17.1)	−22.4 (−8.3)	−12.8 (9.0)	−4.4 (24.1)	−0.8 (30.6)	6.1 (43.0)	4.4 (39.9)	−0.8 (30.6)	−6.7 (19.9)	−13.1 (8.4)	−23.3 (−9.9)	−28.5 (−19.3)
Record low wind chill	−40.4	−41.1	−33.9	−24.4	−10.6	−4.0	0.0	0.0	−3.0	−10.1	−23.9	−35.6	−41.1
Average precipitation mm (inches)	125.9 (4.96)	111.0 (4.37)	120.2 (4.73)	106.4 (4.19)	109.7 (4.32)	89.8 (3.54)	86.7 (3.41)	90.5 (3.56)	107.3 (4.22)	139.8 (5.50)	159.1 (6.26)	146.9 (5.78)	1,393.3 (54.85)
Average rainfall mm (inches)	78.6 (3.09)	70.7 (2.78)	89.0 (3.50)	90.4 (3.56)	108.2 (4.26)	89.8 (3.54)	86.7 (3.41)	90.5 (3.56)	107.3 (4.22)	139.2 (5.48)	145.4 (5.72)	106.8 (4.20)	1,202.4 (47.34)
Average snowfall cm (inches)	53.9 (21.2)	44.3 (17.4)	34.4 (13.5)	16.6 (6.5)	2.1 (0.8)	0.0 (0.0)	0.0 (0.0)	0.0 (0.0)	0.0 (0.0)	0.6 (0.2)	19.4 (7.6)	44.1 (17.4)	215.2 (84.7)
Average precipitation days (≥ 0.2 mm)	18.7	15.2	14.6	14.6	13.5	12.2	11.0	10.8	10.1	12.8	14.6	16.9	164.8
Average rainy days (≥ 0.2 mm)	8.0	6.2	8.7	12.0	13.1	12.2	11.0	10.8	10.1	12.8	12.5	9.8	127.4
Average snowy days (≥ 0.2 cm)	14.4	12.1	8.8	5.3	0.6	0.0	0.0	0.0	0.0	0.2	3.7	11.0	56.0
Average relative humidity (%) (at 15:00 LST)	74.1	67.7	63.9	61.4	60.8	62.0	63.3	62.2	64.5	67.5	73.6	77.0	66.5
Average dew point °C (°F)	−6.9 (19.6)	−7.1 (19.2)	−4.5 (23.9)	−0.2 (31.6)	4.9 (40.8)	10.2 (50.4)	14.5 (58.1)	14.9 (58.8)	11.9 (53.4)	6.5 (43.7)	1.6 (34.9)	−3.1 (26.4)	3.6 (38.5)
Source 1: Environment and Climate Change Canada
Source 2: weatherstats.ca (for dewpoint and monthly & yearly average absolute maximum & minimum temperature)

=== Metropolitan landscape ===
As of the 2021 Canadian Census, the Halifax Census Metropolitan Area includes all of Halifax County, together with the Municipality of East Hants. The total land area of this metropolitan area is 727,622 hectares (7,276.22 square kilometres; 2,809.36 square miles)

In Canada, metro areas include neighbouring municipalities where more than half of the commuters commute into the core municipality. Between the 2016 Canadian Census and the 2021 Canadian Census, East Hants, a formerly rural, but increasingly exurban community located north of the main Halifax population centre, was added to the Halifax metro area, due to the increased population who commute from East Hants to Halifax. Before the 2021 Canadian Census, Metropolitan Halifax covered 549,631 hectares (5,496.31 square kilometres; 2,122.14 square miles) After the addition of the East Hants, the metropolitan area's land area expanded by 177,991 hectares (1,779.91 km^{2}) to its current land area.

=== Municipal landscape ===
Since 1 April 1996, the entirety of the County of Halifax and all its places (cities, suburbs, towns, and villages) were turned into communities of a larger single-tier municipality called Halifax Regional Municipality. As of 2021, the total surface area of the municipality is 5,475.57 km^{2} (2,114.13 sq mi).

==== Regional Centre ====
There are varying definitions of the "core" of Halifax. For planning purposes, the Municipality defines the "Regional Centre" as including the Halifax Peninsula and Dartmouth inside the Circumferential Highway. This urban area covers 3,300 hectares (33 square kilometres; 13 square miles) and houses 96,619 people in 55,332 dwelling units as of the 2016 Census.

==== Communities and neighbourhoods ====
There are over 200 official communities and neighbourhoods within the Halifax municipality. The former town of Bedford, and the former cities of Dartmouth and Halifax have maintained their original geographic names. Furthermore, some communities that were suburban, or even rural before 1996, now have become more urban and have attained community status (e.g. Cole Harbour, Lower Sackville, Spryfield, etc.)

=== Urban landscape ===
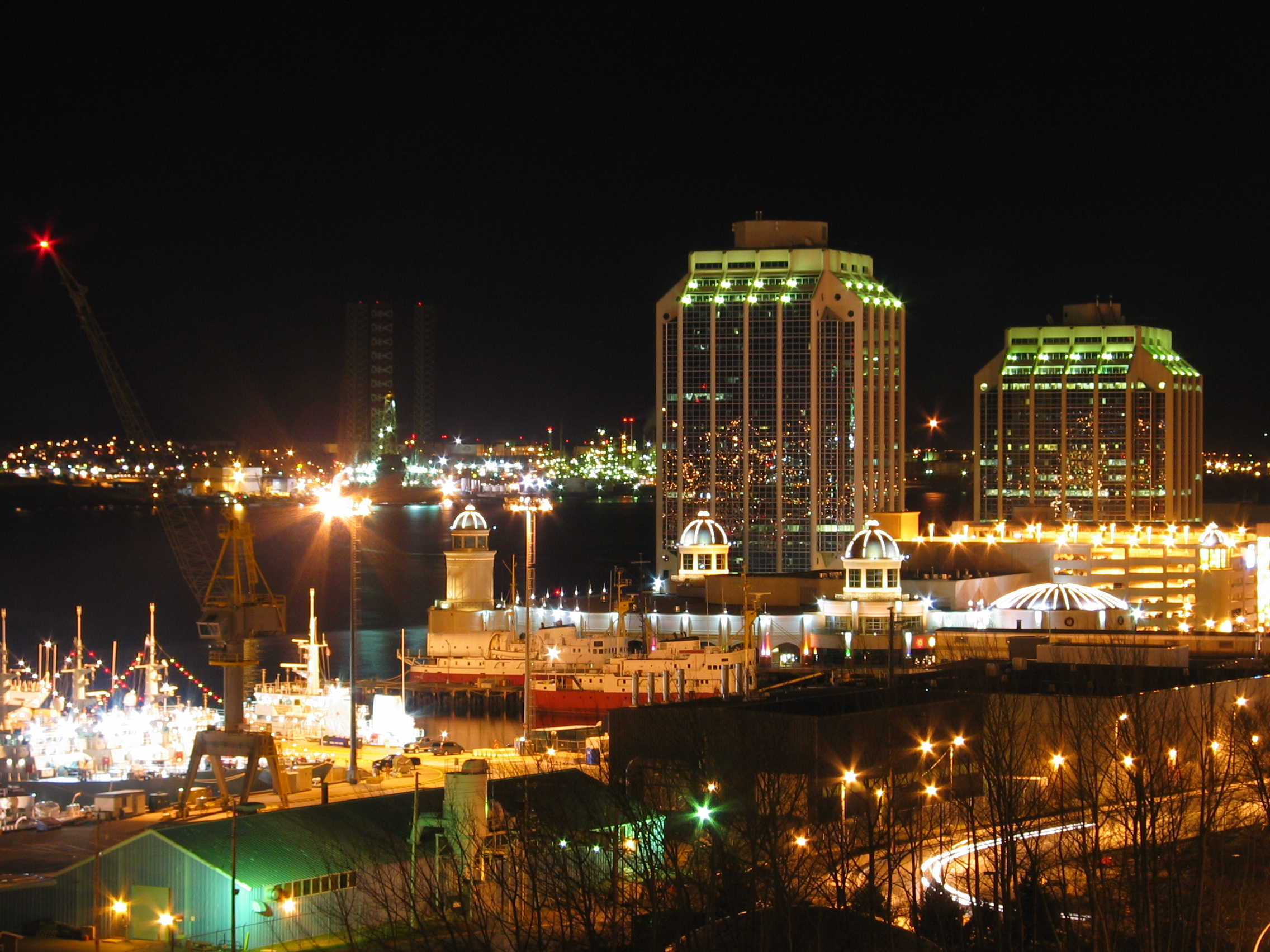
View of Purdy's Wharf, an office complex in Downtown Halifax

At 23,829 hectares (238.29 square kilometres; 92.00 square miles), Halifax's urban area (defined as population centre by Statistics Canada) is less than five percent of the municipal land area. The area surrounds Halifax Harbour and its main centres are Bedford, Dartmouth, and Halifax (and their respective environs).

Between the 2016 Canadian Census and the 2021 Canadian Census, the built-up area of Halifax grew by 357 hectares (3.57 km^{2}) from 23,472 hectares (234.72 km^{2}) in 2016 to 23,829 hectares (238.29 km^{2}) in 2021.

== Culture ==
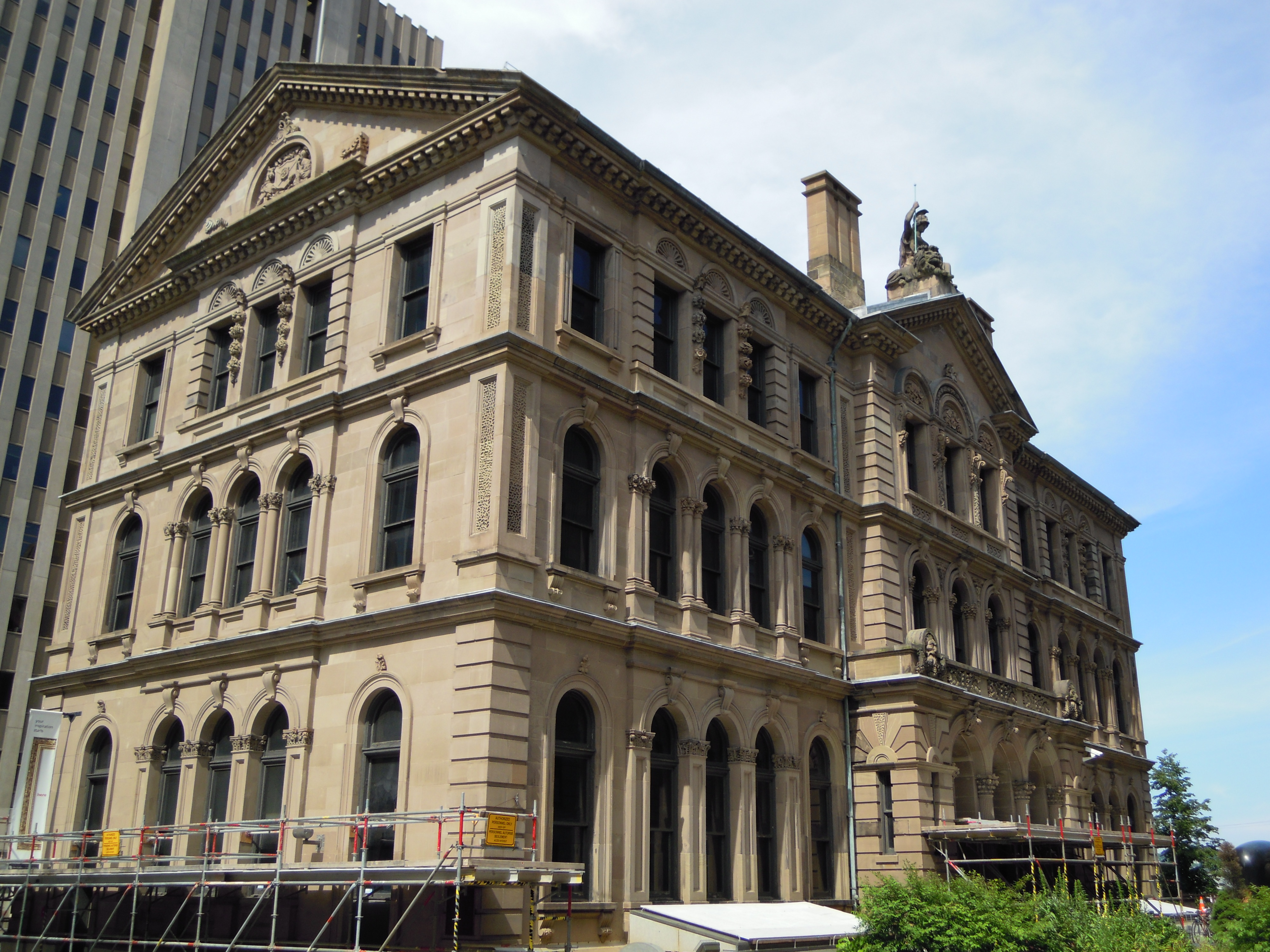
The Art Gallery of Nova Scotia, the largest art gallery in Atlantic Canada

Halifax is a major cultural centre within the Atlantic provinces. The municipality has maintained many of its maritime and military traditions, while opening itself to a growing multicultural population. The municipality's urban core also benefits from a large population of post-secondary students who strongly influence the local cultural scene. Halifax has a number of art galleries, theatres and museums, as well as most of the region's national-quality sports and entertainment facilities. Halifax is also the home to many of the region's major cultural attractions, such as Halifax Pop Explosion, Symphony Nova Scotia, the Art Gallery of Nova Scotia, The Khyber, the Maritime Museum of the Atlantic and the Neptune Theatre (Halifax, Nova Scotia).

The new Halifax Central Library on Spring Garden Road has received accolades for its architecture including the Governor General's Medal in Architecture and was described by Canadian Architect as "the most significant public building completed in the Nova Scotia capital in over a generation, and a new cultural hub for the region".

=== Architecture ===
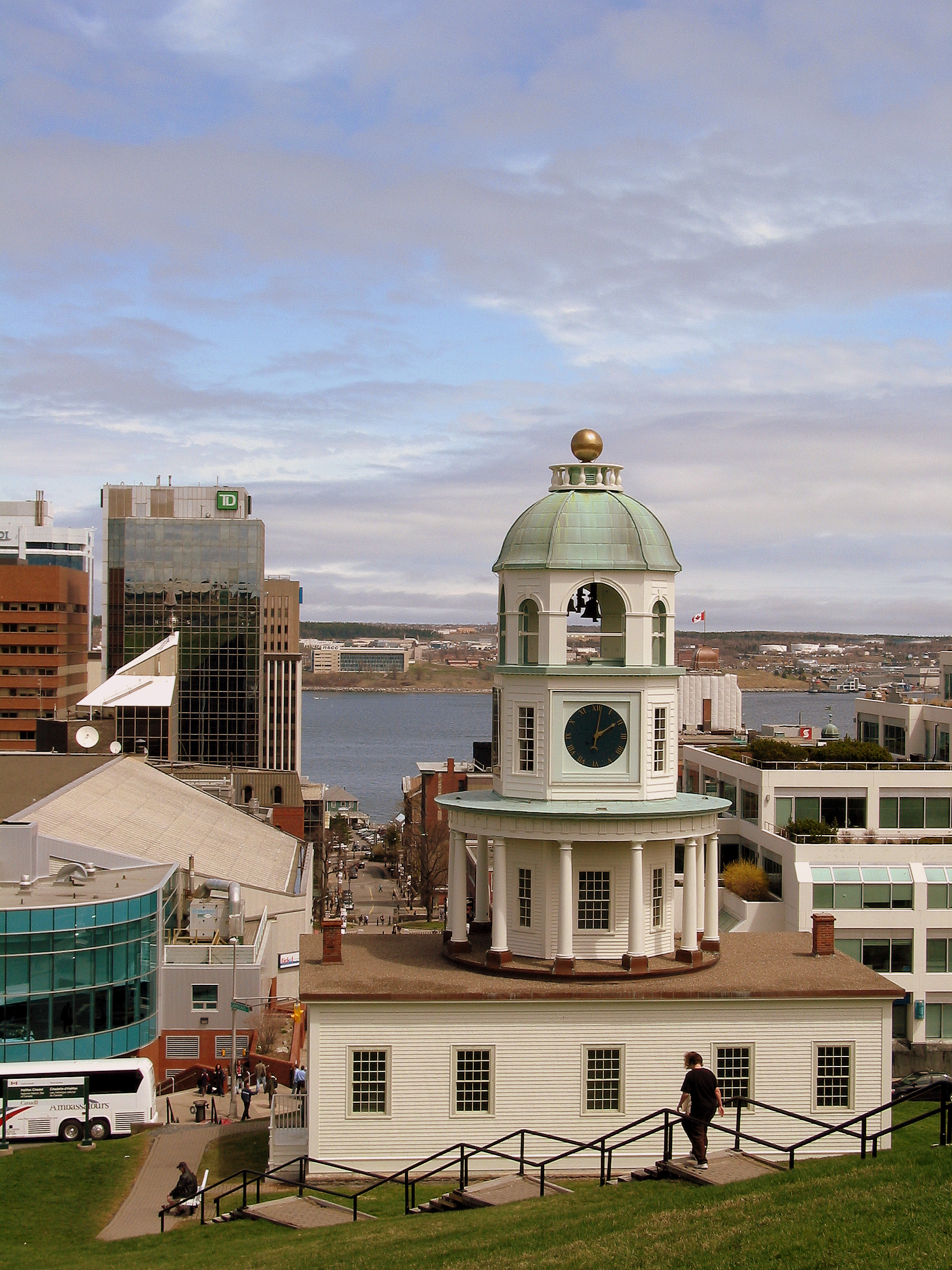
The Halifax Town Clock overlooks most of downtown Halifax.

Halifax's urban core is home to a number of regional landmark buildings and retains significant historic buildings and districts. Downtown office towers are overlooked by the fortress of Citadel Hill with its iconic Halifax Town Clock.

=== Public spaces ===
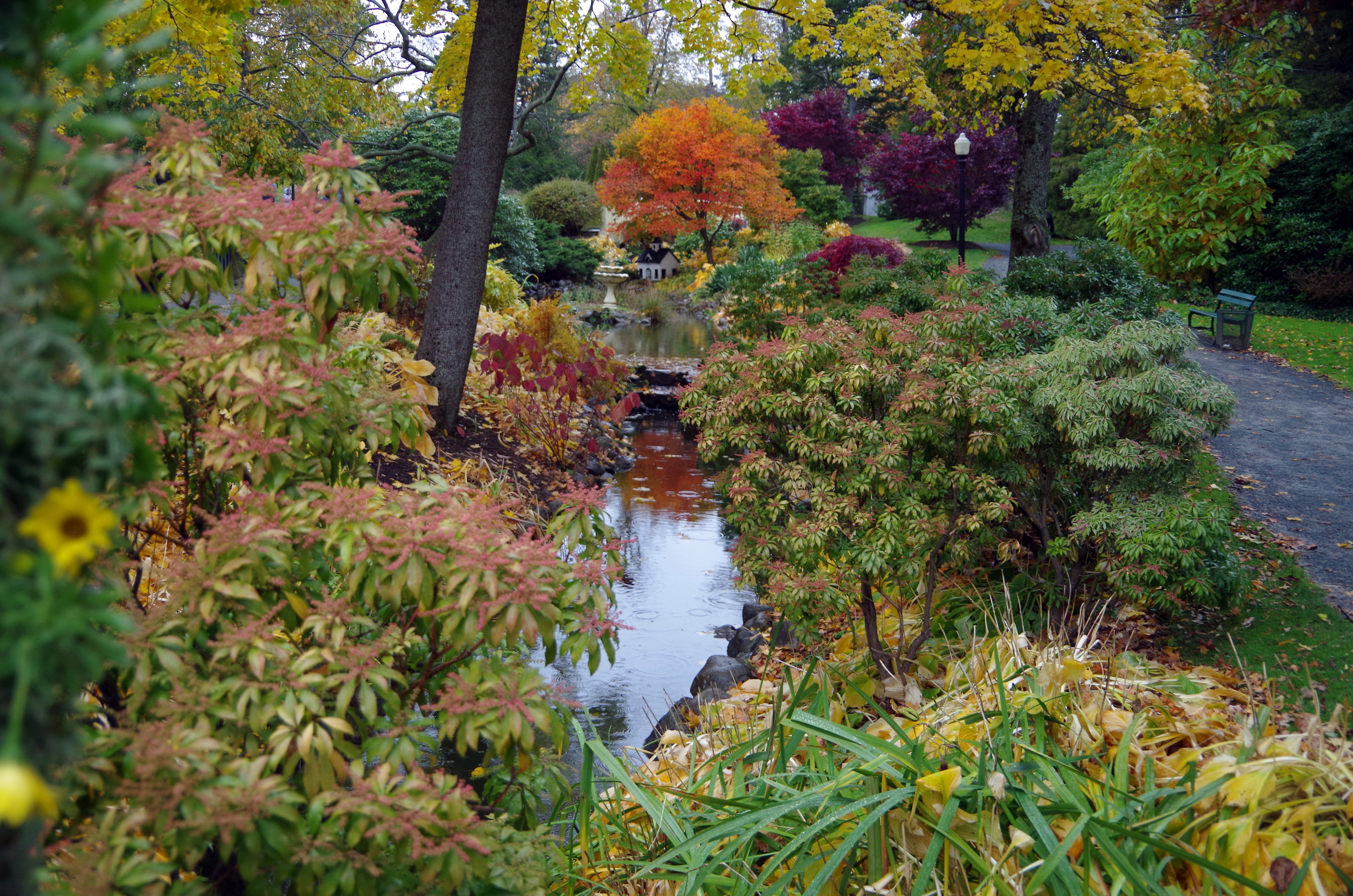
Halifax Public Gardens, a Victorian era public garden that was designated as a National Historic Site of Canada in 1984

The Halifax area has a variety of public spaces, ranging from urban gardens, public squares, expansive forested parks, and historic sites. The original grid plan devised when Halifax was founded in 1749 included a central military parade square, the Grand Parade. The square hosts the City Hall at one end, and is a popular site for concerts, political demonstrations, as well as the annual Remembrance Day ceremony at the central cenotaph. Another popular downtown public space is the timber Halifax Boardwalk, which stretches approximately 4-kilometre (2.5 mi) and is integrated with several squares and monuments.

The Halifax Common, granted for the use of citizens in 1763, is Canada's oldest public park. Centrally located on the Halifax Peninsula, the wide fields are a popular location for sports. The slopes of Citadel Hill, overlooking downtown, are favoured by sunbathers and kite-flyers. The Halifax Public Gardens, a short walk away, are Victorian era public gardens formally established in 1867 and designated a National Historic Site in 1984. Victoria Park, across the street, contains various monuments and statues erected by the North British Society, as well as a fountain. In contrast to the urban parks, the expansive Point Pleasant Park at the southern tip of the peninsula is heavily forested and contains the remains of numerous British fortifications.

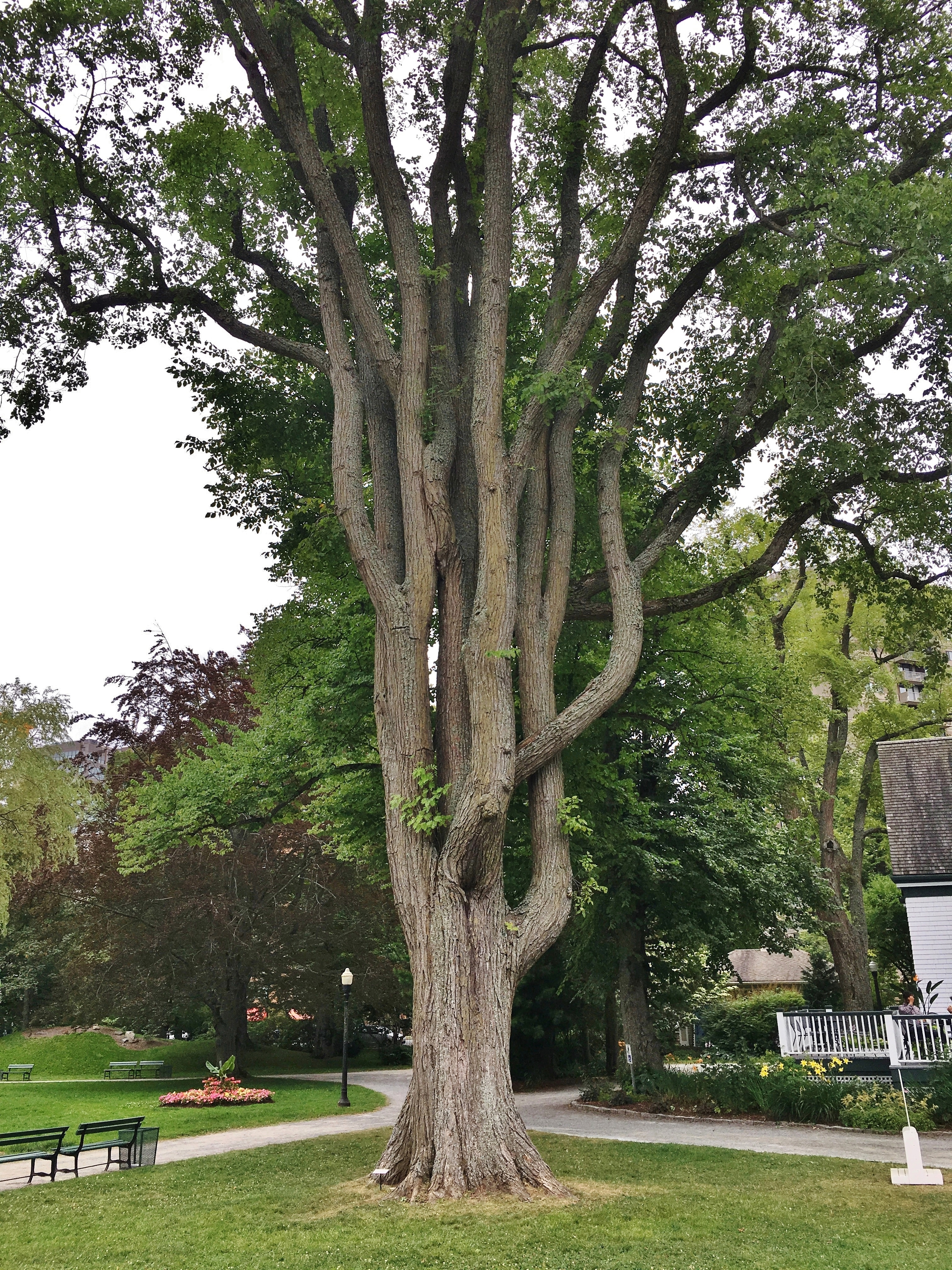
An elm tree in Halifax Public Gardens

Located on the opposite side of the harbour, the Dartmouth Commons is a large park next to Downtown Dartmouth laid out in the 1700s. It is home to the Leighton Dillman gardens and various sports grounds. Nearby, the Dartmouth waterfront trail stretches from Downtown Dartmouth to Woodside. Among residents of central Dartmouth, the area around Sullivan's Pond and Lake Banook is popular for strolling and paddling. The forested Shubie Park, through which the historic Shubenacadie Canal runs, is a major park in suburban Dartmouth.

Mainland Halifax is home to several significant parks, including Sir Sandford Fleming Park, gifted to the people of Halifax by Sir Sandford Fleming. It houses the Dingle Tower, dedicated in 1912 by the Duke of Connaught to commemorate 150 years of representative government in Nova Scotia. The Mainland Common, in Clayton Park, is a modern park home to various sports and community facilities. Long Lake Provincial Park, comprising more than 2,000 hectares, was designated in 1984 and affords Halifax residents access to a scenic wilderness in close proximity to the urban communities.

=== Tourism ===
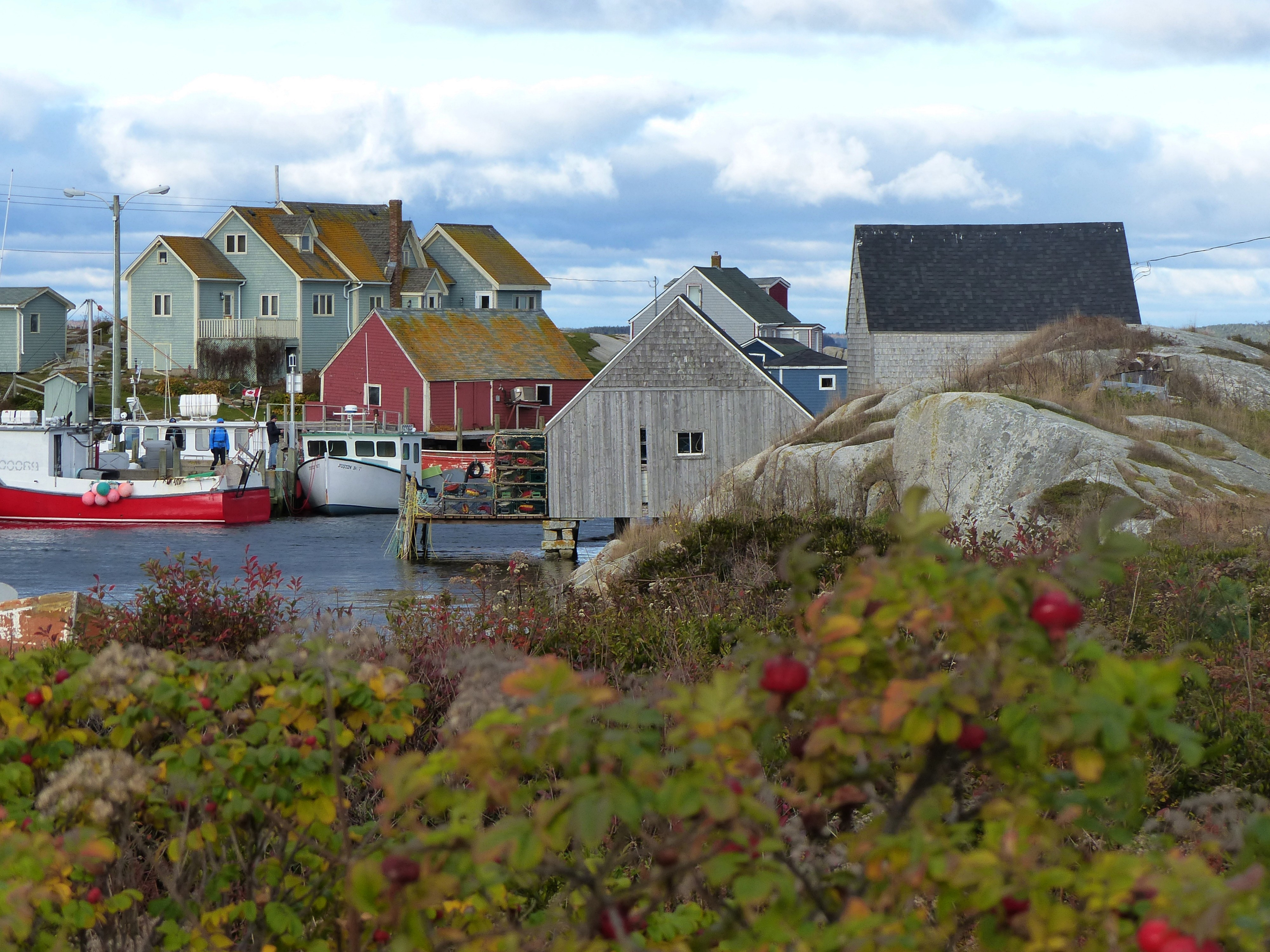
The community of Peggys Cove, a major tourist attraction

Halifax's tourism industry showcases Nova Scotia's culture, scenery and coastline. There are several museums and art galleries in downtown Halifax. The Canadian Museum of Immigration at Pier 21, an immigrant entry point prominent throughout the 1930s, 1940s, and 1950s, was opened to the public as a National Historic Site of Canada in 1999 and is the only national museum in the Atlantic provinces. The Maritime Museum of the Atlantic is a maritime museum containing extensive galleries including a large exhibit on the famous Titanic, over 70 small craft and a 200-foot (61 m) steamship CSS Acadia. In summertime the preserved World War II corvette HMCS Sackville operates as a museum ship and Canada's naval memorial. The Art Gallery of Nova Scotia is housed in a 150-year-old building containing nearly 19,000 works of art. The Black Cultural Centre for Nova Scotia in Dartmouth reflects the region's rich ethnic heritage.

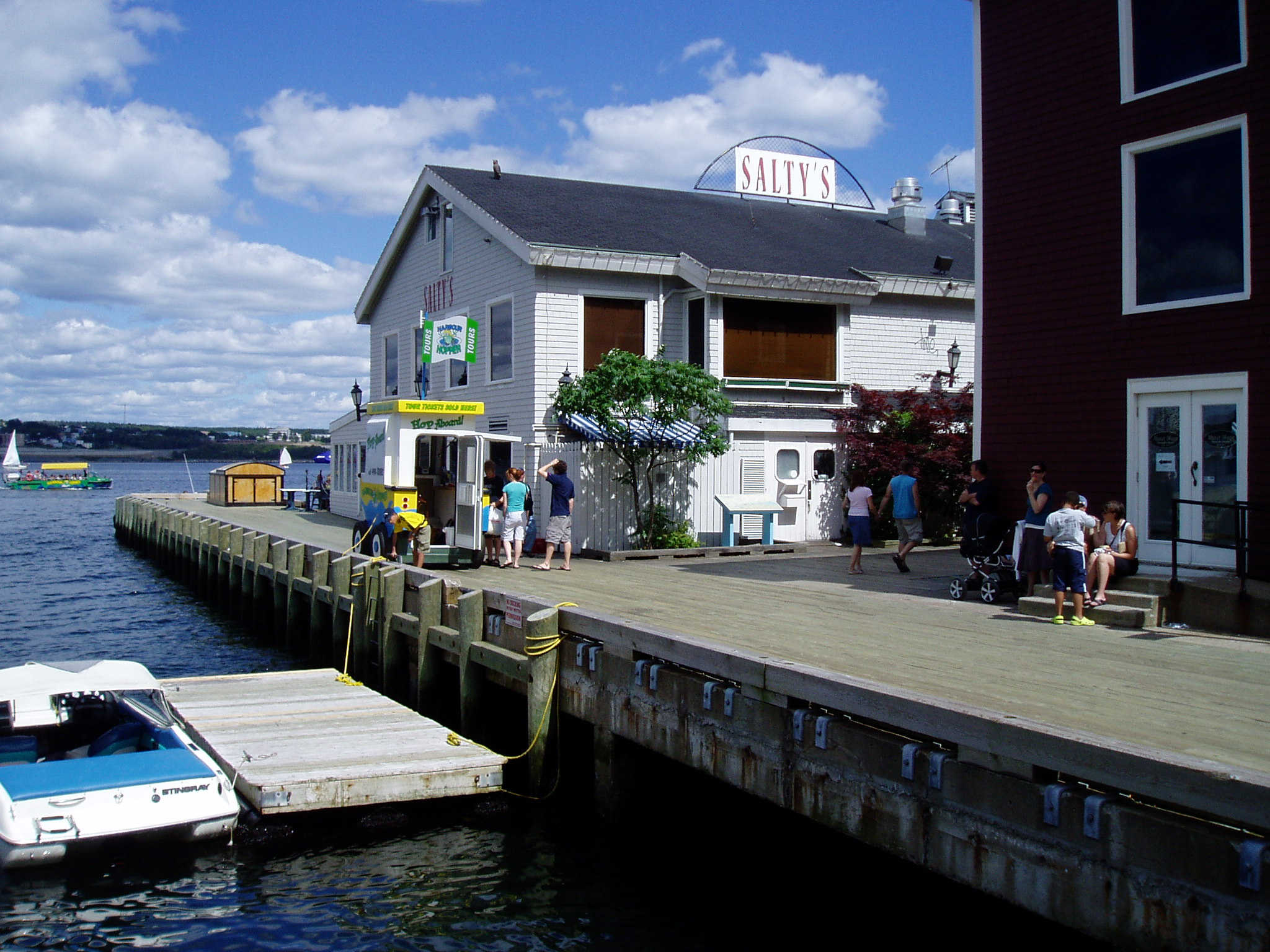
The Halifax Boardwalk, a public footpath along Halifax Harbour

Halifax has numerous National Historic Sites, most notably Citadel Hill (Fort George). Just outside the urban area, the iconic Peggys Cove is internationally recognized and receives more than 600,000 visitors a year.

The waterfront in Downtown Halifax is the site of the Halifax Boardwalk, a 4-kilometre (2.5 mi) boardwalk popular among tourists and locals alike. Many mid-sized ships dock here at one of the many wharfs. The boardwalk is home to a Halifax Transit ferry terminal, hundreds of stores, Historic Properties, several office buildings, the Casino Nova Scotia, and several public squares where buskers perform, most prominently at the annual Halifax Busker Festival every August over Nova Scotia's Natal Day long weekend.

Cruise ships also visit the municipality frequently. In 2024, the Port of Halifax welcomed 201 cruise ships with 360,000 passengers.

=== Media ===
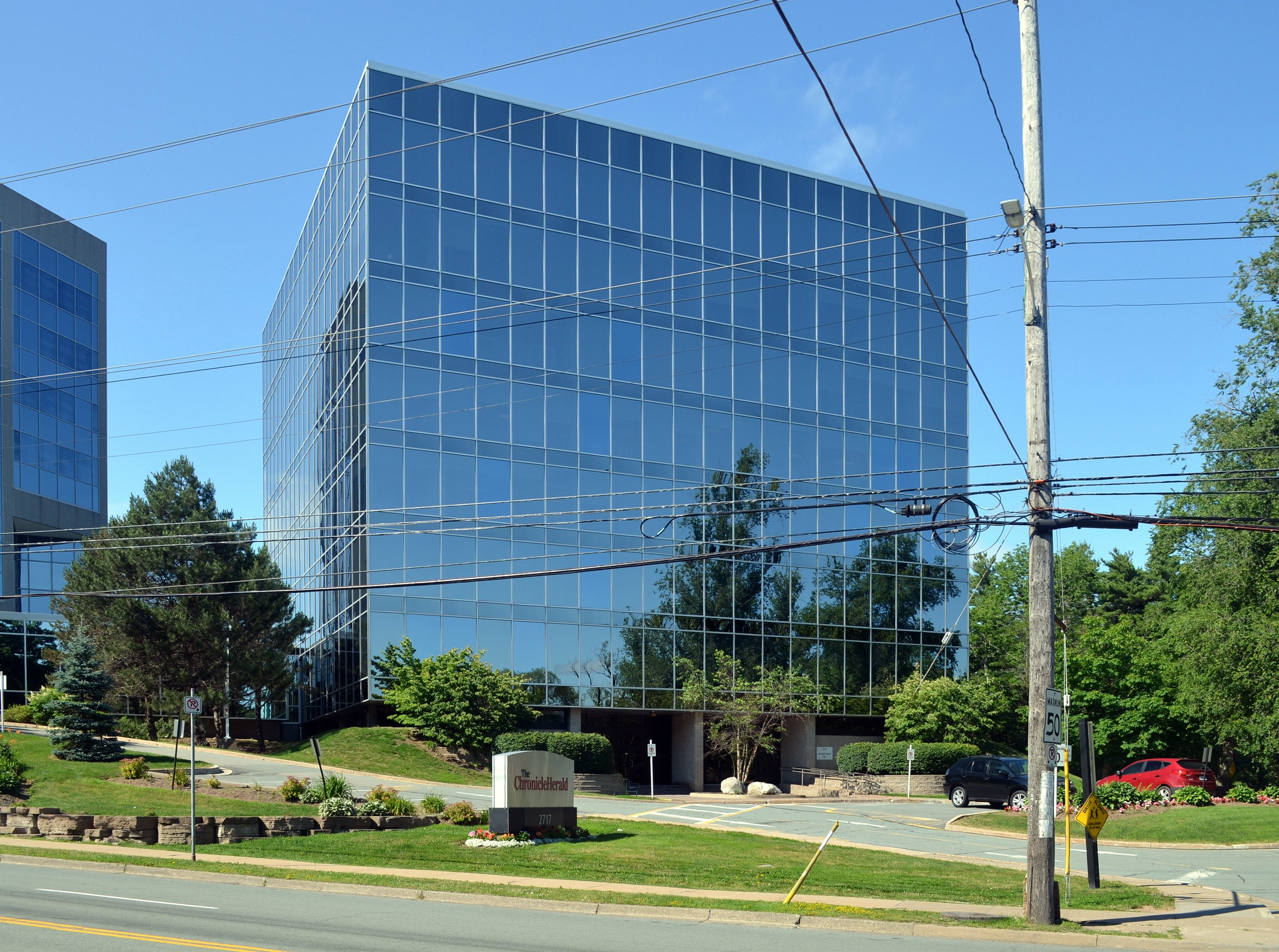
Headquarters of The Chronicle Herald, a daily newspaper published in Halifax

Halifax is the Atlantic region's central point for radio broadcast and press media. CBC Television, CTV Television Network (CTV), and Global Television Network and other broadcasters all have important regional television concentrators in the municipality. CBC Radio has a major regional studio and there are also regional hubs for Rogers Radio and various private broadcast franchises, as well as a regional bureau for The Canadian Press/Broadcast News.

Halifax's print media is centred on its single daily newspaper, the broadsheet Chronicle Herald as well as two free newspapers, the daily commuter-oriented edition of Metro International and the free alternative arts weekly The Coast.

Halifax has several online daily newspapers. allNovaScotia is a daily, subscriber-only outlet which focuses on business and political news from across the province. CityNews Halifax, associated with the CJNI-FM radio station, was created from a merger of the former News 95.7 and HalifaxToday (previously Local Xpress) news websites. The Halifax Examiner was founded by the former news editor of The Coast in 2014 and, like allNovaScotia, is supported through subscriptions.

From 1974 to 2008, Halifax had a second daily newspaper, the tabloid The Daily News, which still publishes several neighbourhood weekly papers such as The Bedford-Sackville Weekly News, The Halifax West-Clayton Park Weekly News and the Dartmouth-Cole Harbour Weekly News. These weekly papers compete with The Chronicle-Herald's weekly Community Heralds HRM West, HRM East, and HRM North.

== Sports ==
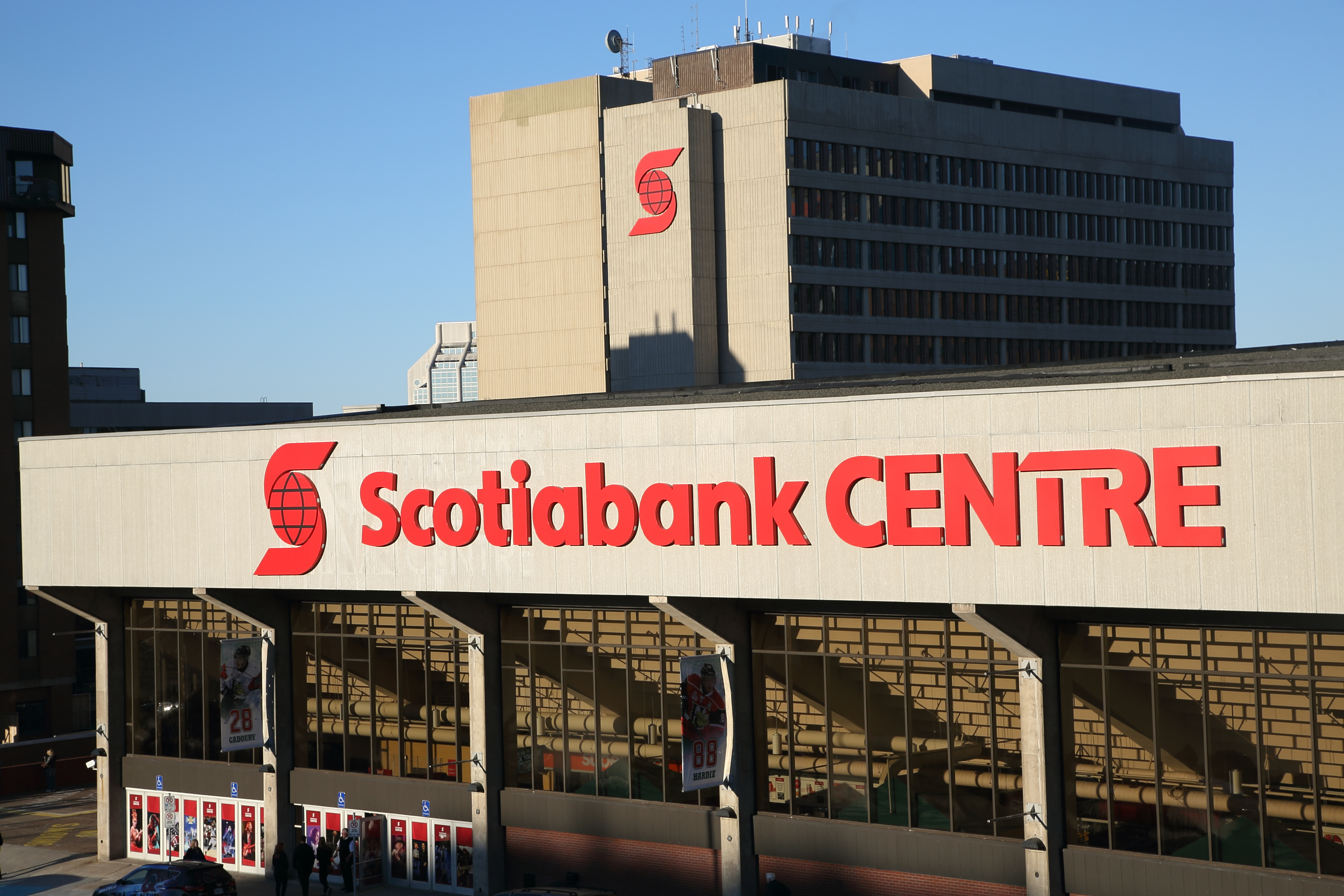
The Scotiabank Centre, the largest multi-purpose sporting arena in Atlantic Canada

Halifax is represented by three professional sports teams, with teams in the National Lacrosse League (NLL), the Canadian Premier League (CPL), the Northern Super League (NSL). The Halifax Mooseheads play in the Quebec Maritimes Junior Hockey League (QMJHL), which is part of the Canadian Hockey League (CHL). It is also home to four universities that have athletic programmes.

Halifax's major sports venues include the Scotiabank Centre (formerly the Metro Centre), the Halifax Forum, the Wanderers Grounds and various university sports facilities, such as Huskies Stadium.

=== Professional and semi-professional sports ===
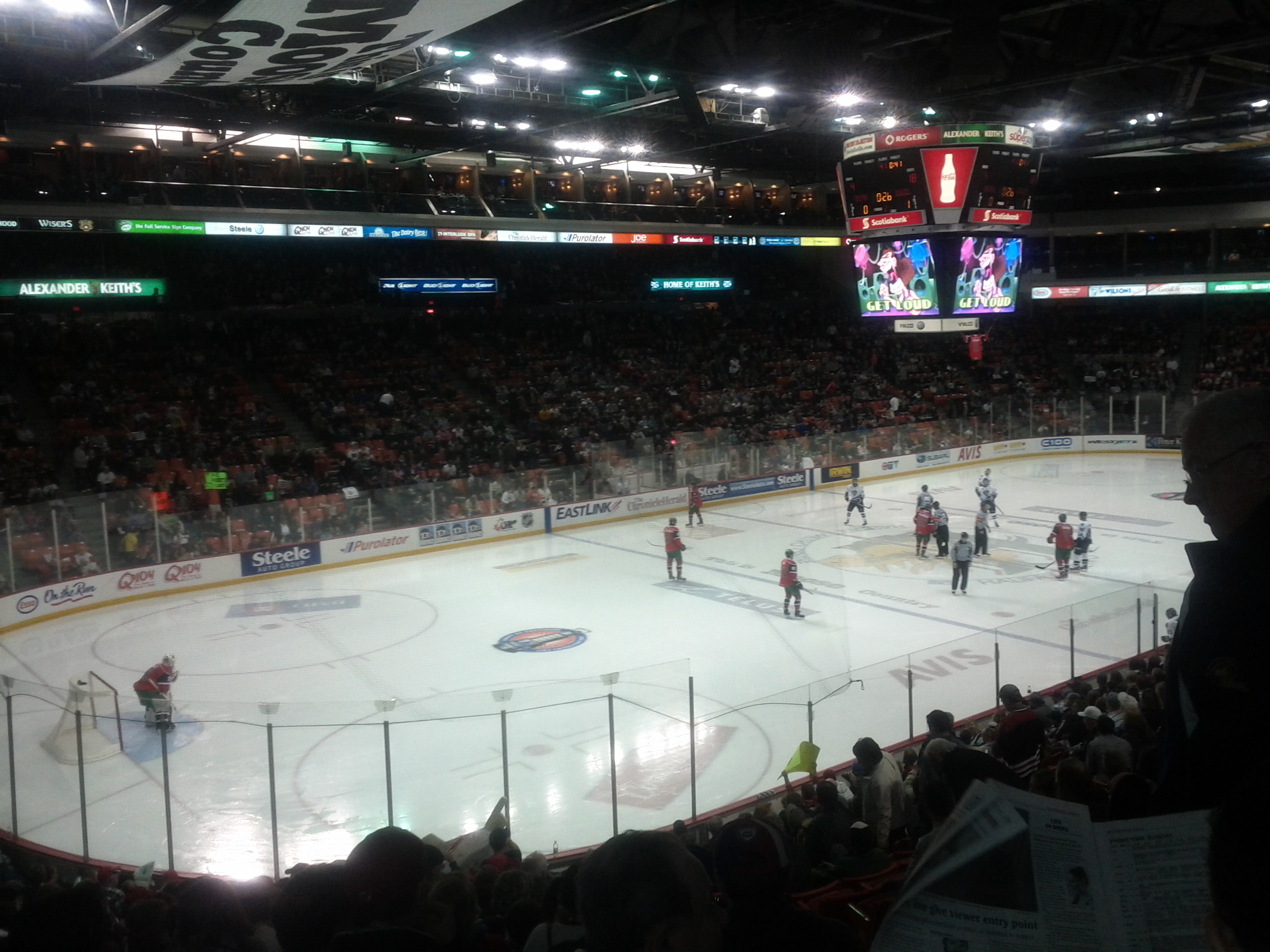
Halifax Mooseheads prepare for a 2012 semi-final game.

Halifax is home to the Halifax Mooseheads, the semi-professional major junior hockey club of the Quebec Maritimes Junior Hockey League (QMJHL). Founded in 1994, the Mooseheads were the first team from Atlantic Canada to join the QMJHL. They began play in the league's Dilio Division in the 1994–95 season, In 2013, the Mooseheads capped a 74-win season (74–7–3–1) with a QMJHL's President's Cup championship. While hosting the tournament, the Mooseheads also won the CHL's 2013 Memorial Cup. They have appeared in the President's Cup Finals four more times: 2003, 2005, 2019 and 2023. They hosted the Memorial Cup tournaments two more times in 2000 and 2019.

The Halifax Thunderbirds became the city's National Lacrosse League team in September 2018, when it moved from Rochester. On March 12, 2020, their inaugural season was cut short by the COVID-19 pandemic. Still, the team received two league awards: Defensive Player of the Year and Executive of the Year. In the 2021–2022 season, they reached their first playoffs, where they were defeated by the Toronto Rock 14–13 in overtime in the conference semi-final.

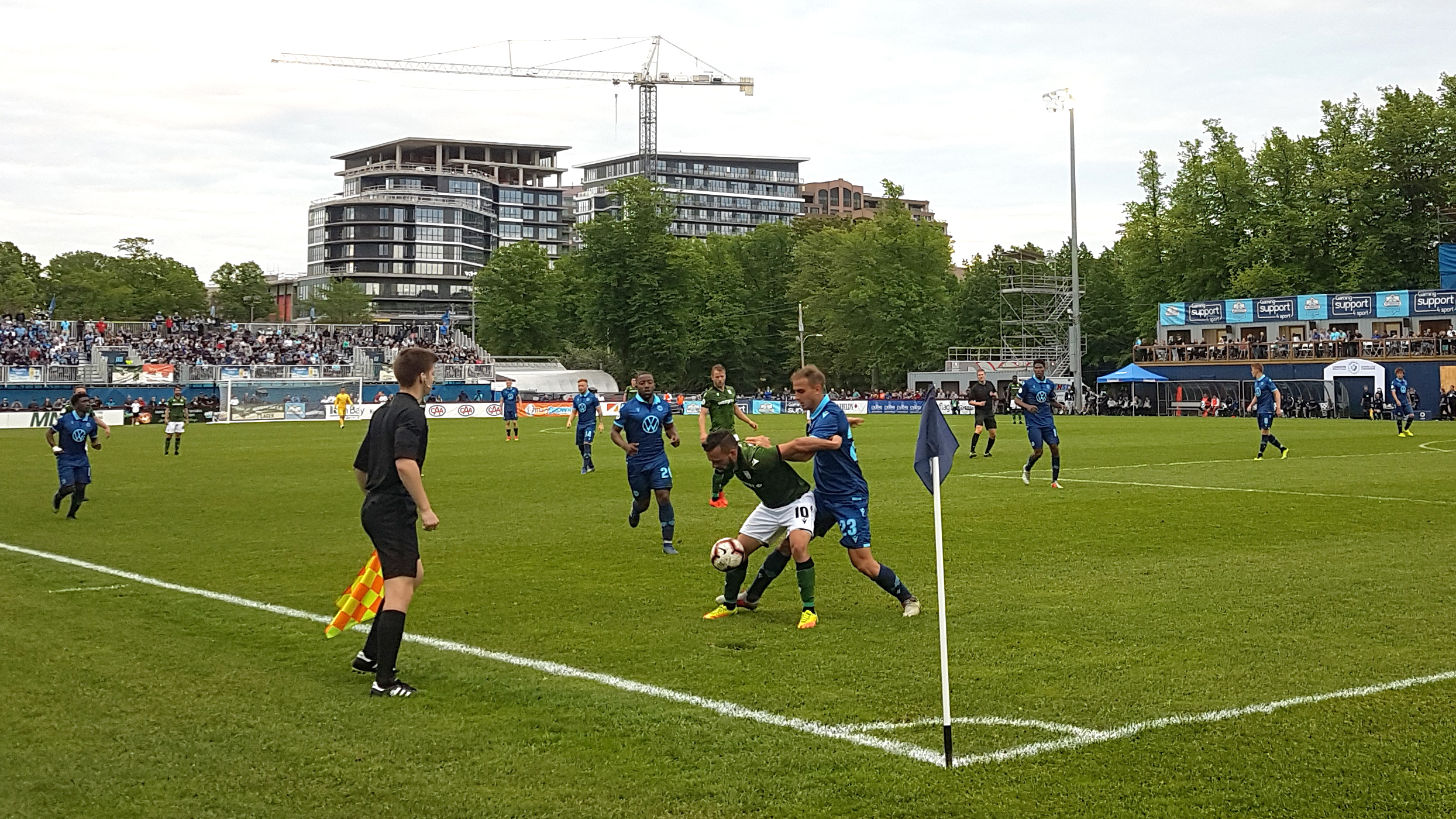
Canadian Premier League action in June 2019

In 2019, HFX Wanderers FC debuted as an expansion club in the Canadian Premier League (CPL)—Canada's professional men's soccer league. In 2025, Halifax Tides FC debuted as a founding member of the Northern Super League (NSL), a newly established professional women's soccer league.

The Halifax Hoopers began play in The Basketball League in 2025, returning professional basketball to the area after the closure of the Halifax Hurricanes.

Halifax has been a recurring subject of proposed expansion teams in the Canadian Football League; the Atlantic Schooners were proposed in the 1980s as a Halifax-based expansion team that would play out of Dartmouth, but folded after failing to secure funding for a stadium. A second attempt at the Schooners was pursued by an ownership group known as Schooners Sports and Entertainment in the 2010s; in an effort to gauge interest in the franchise, the group hosted the neutral-site Touchdown Atlantic game at Huskies Stadium in 2023, marking the first regular-season CFL game played in Halifax. The Schooners Sports and Entertainment bid also collapsed, after the ownership group was unable to secure a deal for a stadium in Dartmouth.

Current professional/semi-professional sports teams in Halifax
Club	League	Sport	Venue	Established	Championships
Halifax Mooseheads	QMJHL	Major Junior Hockey	Scotiabank Centre	1994	1 (last in 2013)
Halifax Thunderbirds	NLL	Box Lacrosse	Scotiabank Centre	2019	0
HFX Wanderers FC	CPL	Men's Soccer	Wanderers Grounds	2018	0
Halifax Tides FC	NSL	Women's Soccer	Wanderers Grounds	2024	0

=== Former professional teams ===
The city had a team in The Basketball League from 2024-2026 called the Halifax Hoopers. And before that the city had a team in the National Basketball League of Canada (NBL Canada) called the Halifax Hurricanes. The team succeeded the Halifax Rainmen who had previously played in the American Basketball Association and Premier Basketball League before joining the NBL Canada and later declaring bankruptcy in July 2015. The Hurricanes won the NBL Canada championship in their inaugural season. The Hurricanes have since ceased operations.

Between 1971 and 1993, Halifax was home to three teams in the American Hockey League. The Nova Scotia Voyageurs (Montreal Canadiens affiliate), the Nova Scotia Oilers (Edmonton Oilers affiliate) and finally, the Halifax Citadels (Quebec Nordiques affiliate) played from 1971 to 1984, 1984 to 1988, and 1988 to 1993, respectively.

The Nova Scotia Clippers were a team in the original Canadian Soccer League (1987–1992) for its 1991 season.

The Halifax Crescents, an amateur and later, professional ice hockey team challenged for the Stanley Cup in 1900 but lost to the Montreal Shamrocks.

=== University sports ===
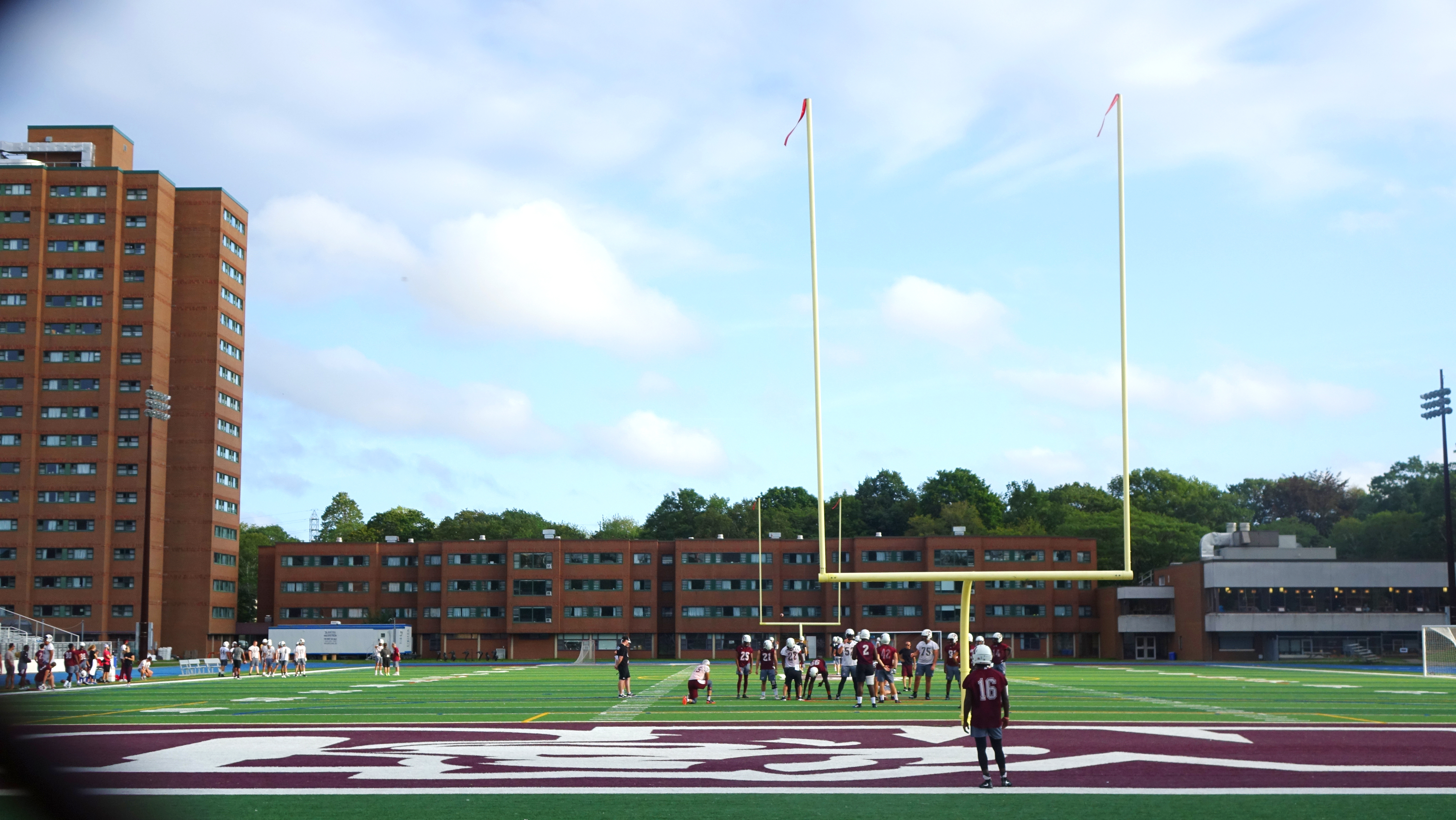
Huskies Stadium in 2018

Halifax is home to seven degree-granting post-secondary educational institutions with four of them having athletic programmes. Two of the schools, Dalhousie University and Saint Mary's University are part of the U Sports league, while Mount Saint Vincent University and University of King's College are a part of the Canadian Collegiate Athletic Association (CCAA).

Dalhousie University's varsity team goes by the moniker Tigers. They have teams for basketball, hockey, soccer, swimming, track and field, cross country running, and volleyball. The Tigers garnered a number of championships in the first decade of the 20th century, winning 63 AUS championships and two U Sports championships.

Halifax's other U Sports university, located in close proximity to Dalhousie University, is Saint Mary's University with the moniker of the Huskies. Known for their football programme, the Huskies play at Huskies Stadium and won back-to-back Canadian University Football Championships (2001 & 2002), only the third university to do so.

Finally, two of Halifax's smaller universities are part of the Canadian Collegiate Athletic Association (CCAA). Mount Saint Vincent University, home to the Mystics, competes in the Atlantic Collegiate Athletic Association (ACAA), a member of the CCAA, in Women's & Men's Basketball, Women's & Men's Soccer, Cross Country and Women's Volleyball. The Mystics hold a championship titles in all sports, making them the most acclaimed team of the ACAA division. University of King's College is also a member of the ACAA. The varsity athletics teams at the University of King's College are named the Blue Devils. Sporting teams include men's and women's basketball, soccer, badminton and rugby, and women's volleyball.

From 1984 to 2007, the region was home to the CIS Men's Basketball Championship; the tournament was moved to Ottawa, Ontario, from 2008 to 2010 and returned to Halifax in 2011 and 2012.

=== Events ===
Over the past several decades, Halifax has hosted many major sporting events, including the following:

- 1997 ICF Canoe Sprint World Championships
- 1999 Four Continents Figure Skating Championships
- 2003 World Junior Ice Hockey Championship
- 2003 Nokia Brier
- 2004 IIHF Women's World Championship
- 2005 Canadian Olympic Curling Trials
- 2007 World Indoor Lacrosse Championship
- 2008 IIHF World Championship (Co-hosted with Quebec City)
- 2009 ICF Canoe Sprint World Championships
- 2011 Canada Winter Games
- 2020 IIHF Women's World Ice Hockey Championships (Co-hosted with Truro, Nova Scotia) Although, the tournament was cancelled due to COVID-19.
- 2022 ICF Canoe Sprint World Championships
- 2023 World Junior Ice Hockey Championships (Co-hosted with Moncton, New Brunswick)
- 2023 North American Indigenous Games

Halifax was selected in 2006 as the host municipality in Canada's bid for the 2014 Commonwealth Games but withdrew on March 8, 2007, citing ballooning costs from final estimates of $1.7 billion up from $785 million.

== Demographics ==
=== Halifax CMA ===
At the census metropolitan area (CMA) level in the 2021 census, the Halifax CMA had a population of 465,703 living in 201,138 of its 211,789 total private dwellings, a change of 9.1% from its 2016 population of 426,932. With a land area of 7,276.22 km^{2} (2,809.36 sq mi), it had a population density of 64.0/km^{2} (165.8/sq mi) in 2021.

=== Halifax Regional Municipality ===
Historical populations
Year	Pop.	±%
1851	39,914	—
1861	49,021	+22.8%
1871	56,963	+16.2%
1881	67,917	+19.2%
1891	71,358	+5.1%
1901	74,662	+4.6%
1911	80,257	+7.5%
1921	97,228	+21.1%
1931	100,204	+3.1%
1941	122,656	+22.4%
1951	162,217	+32.3%
1961	225,723	+39.1%
1971	261,461	+15.8%
1981	288,126	+10.2%
1991	332,518	+15.4%
1996	342,966	+3.1%
2001	359,183	+4.7%
2006	372,858	+3.8%
2011	390,096	+4.6%
2016	403,131	+3.3%
2021	439,819	+9.1%
Prior to 1996, the figures are for Halifax County. From 1996 onwards, the figures are for Halifax Regional Municipality. Source: Statistics Canada

In the 2021 Census of Population conducted by Statistics Canada, the Halifax Regional Municipality had a population of 439,819 living in 190,512 of its 200,473 total private dwellings, a change of 9.1% from its 2016 population of 403,131. With a land area of 5,475.57 km^{2} (2,114.13 sq mi), it had a population density of 80.3/km^{2} (208.0/sq mi) in 2021.

The 2021 census reported that immigrants (individuals born outside Canada) comprise 50,595 persons or 12.6% of the total population of Halifax. Of the total immigrant population, the top countries of origin were United Kingdom (6,345 persons or 12.5%), India (4,785 persons or 9.5%), China (3,740 persons or 7.4%), United States of America (3,545 persons or 7.0%), Philippines (3,415 persons or 6.7%), Syria (2,085 persons or 4.1%), Nigeria (1,625 persons or 3.2%), Lebanon (1,340 persons or 2.6%), South Korea (1,020 persons or 2.0%), and Iran (980 persons or 1.9%).

==== Ethnicity ====
Largest ethnic origin in Halifax CMA by census tract based on the 2021 census

The largest ethnicities in Halifax Regional Municipality as per the 2021 census are Scottish (23.9%), English (22.9%), Irish (21.4%), French (11.6%), German (9%), and Acadian (4.5%).

Panethnic groups in the Regional Municipality of Halifax (2001−2021)
Panethnic group	2021		2016		2011		2006		2001	
Panethnic group	Pop.	%	Pop.	%	Pop.	%	Pop.	%	Pop.	%
European (Note: Statistic includes all persons that did not make up part of a visible minority or an indigenous identity.)	345,735	79.43%	336,375	84.65%	339,705	88.39%	336,395	91.1%	327,325	91.98%
African	20,565	4.72%	15,085	3.8%	13,780	3.59%	13,270	3.59%	13,080	3.68%
South Asian	16,765	3.85%	6,555	1.65%	3,995	1.04%	2,900	0.79%	2,345	0.66%
Indigenous	16,615	3.82%	15,735	3.96%	9,585	2.49%	5,230	1.42%	3,460	0.97%
East Asian (Note: Statistic includes total responses of "Chinese", "Korean", and "Japanese" under visible minority section on census.)	12,895	2.96%	8,690	2.19%	5,755	1.5%	4,135	1.12%	3,255	0.91%
Middle Eastern (Note: Statistic includes total responses of "West Asian" and "Arab" under visible minority section on census.)	11,160	2.56%	8,725	2.2%	6,730	1.75%	4,510	1.22%	3,360	0.94%
Southeast Asian (Note: Statistic includes total responses of "Filipino" and "Southeast Asian" under visible minority section on census.)	6,345	1.46%	3,440	0.87%	2,220	0.58%	1,185	0.32%	1,195	0.34%
Latin American	2,255	0.52%	1,210	0.3%	1,025	0.27%	695	0.19%	415	0.12%
Other/Multiracial (Note: Statistic includes total responses of "Visible minority, n.i.e." and "Multiple visible minorities" under visible minority section on census.)	2,965	0.68%	1,585	0.4%	1,535	0.4%	960	0.26%	1,440	0.4%
Total responses	435,290	98.97%	397,395	98.58%	384,330	98.52%	369,265	99.08%	355,870	99.1%
Total population	439,819	100%	403,131	100%	390,096	100%	372,679	100%	359,111	100%
Note: Totals greater than 100% due to multiple origin responses

==== Language ====
Mother tongue language (2021)

Rank	Language	Population	Pct (%)
1	English	380,140	86.43%
2	French	13,920	3.16%
3	Arabic	8,595	1.95%
4	Mandarin	6,355	1.44%
5	Punjabi	3,755	0.85%
6	Tagalog	2,930	0.66%
7	Hindi	2,485	0.56%
8	Spanish	2,295	0.52%
9	Korean	2,215	0.50%
10	Russian	1,655	0.37%

==== Religion ====
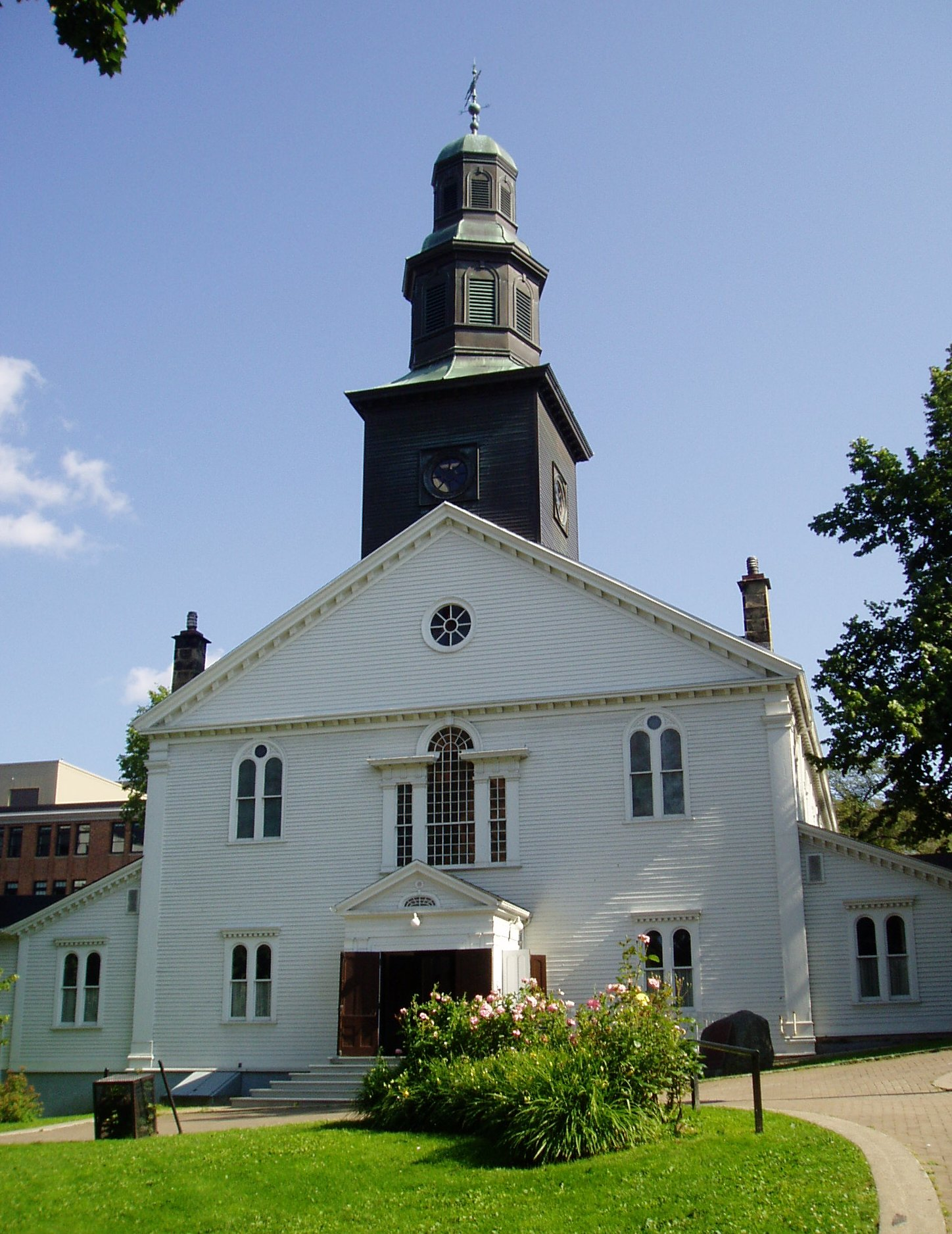
St. Paul's Church

St. Paul's Church is the oldest Christian church in Halifax. Halifax is a religiously diverse municipality, and has several landmark religious institutions:

- St. Mary's Basilica (Halifax, Nova Scotia)
- The New Horizons Baptist Church
- St. George's (Round) Church
- Beth Israel Synagogue
- Shaar Shalom Synagogue

Halifax also houses the Atlantic School of Theology for religious studies.

Religion (2021)

Religion	Population	Percentage (%)
Buddhism	2,195	0.5
Christianity	231,255	53.12
Hinduism	6,840	1.57
Indigenous Spirituality	210	0.04
Irreligion	173,005	39.74
Islam	13,220	3.03
Judaism	1,750	0.4
Sikhism	3,495	0.8
Other religions and spiritual religions	3,315	0.76

=== Halifax urban area ===
Historical urban area population
Year	Pop.	±%
1996	270,047	—
2001	276,221	+2.3%
2006	282,924	+2.4%
2011	304,979	+7.8%
2016	317,334	+4.1%
2021	348,634	+9.9%
Before 1996, figures were from Halifax County. After 1996, figures onwards are for Halifax Regional Municipality. Source:

As of 2021, the population centre (urban area) of Halifax housed 348,634 people living in 154,883 of its 162,336 total private dwellings. The human population density of Halifax's population centre was approximately 1,463.1/km^{2} (3,789.3/sq mi).

Between 2016 and 2021, the urban area (population centre) and municipal areas experienced strong growth. Over that time-frame; the municipality added 36,688 people (an increase of over 9.1%), and the urban area (population centre) added 31,300 people (an increase of over 9.8%).

== Economy ==
The urban area of Halifax is a major economic centre in eastern Canada with a large concentration of government services and private sector companies. Halifax serves as the business, banking, government and cultural centre for the Maritime region. The largest employment sectors within the municipality include trade (36,400 jobs), health care and social assistance (31,800 jobs), professional services (19,000 jobs), education (17,400 jobs), and public administration (15,800 jobs).

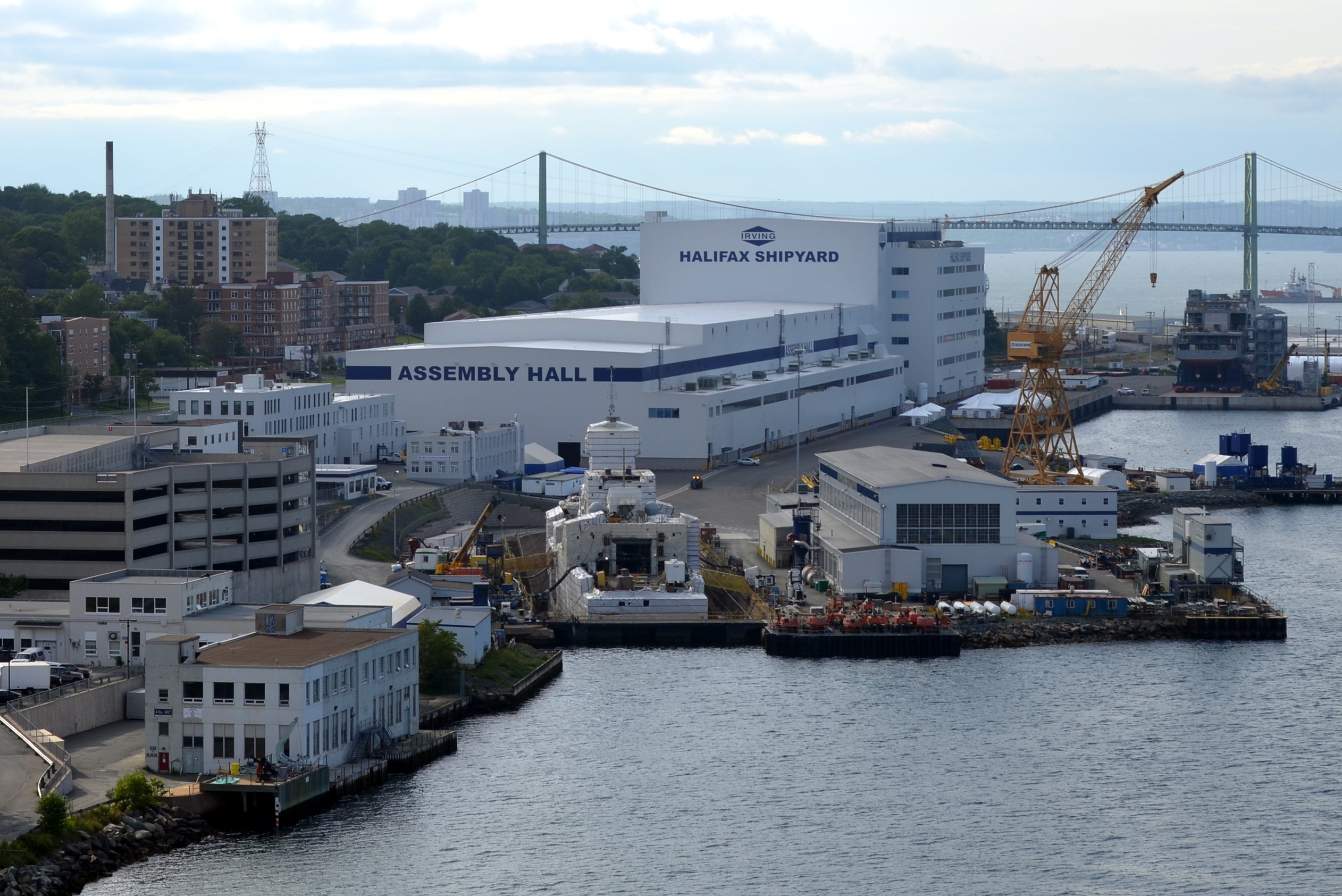
The Halifax Shipyard of Irving Shipbuilding, a major employer in Halifax

Major employers and economic generators include the Department of National Defence, the Port of Halifax, Irving Shipbuilding, the Nova Scotia Health Authority, IMP Group, Bell Aliant, Emera, the Bedford Institute of Oceanography, government, banks, and universities. The municipality has a growing concentration of manufacturing industries and is becoming a major multi-modal transportation hub through growth at the port, the Halifax Stanfield International Airport, and improving rail and highway connections. Halifax is one of Canada's top four container ports in terms of the volume of cargo handled. A real estate boom in recent years has led to numerous new property developments, including the gentrification of some former working-class areas.

Agriculture, fishing, mining, forestry and natural gas extraction are major resource industries found in the rural areas of the municipality. Halifax's largest agricultural district is in the Musquodoboit Valley; the total number of farms in Halifax is 150, of which 110 are family-owned. Fishing harbours are located along all coastal areas with some having an independent harbour authority, such as the Sheet Harbour Industrial Port, and others being managed as small craft harbours under the federal Fisheries and Oceans Canada.

== Government ==
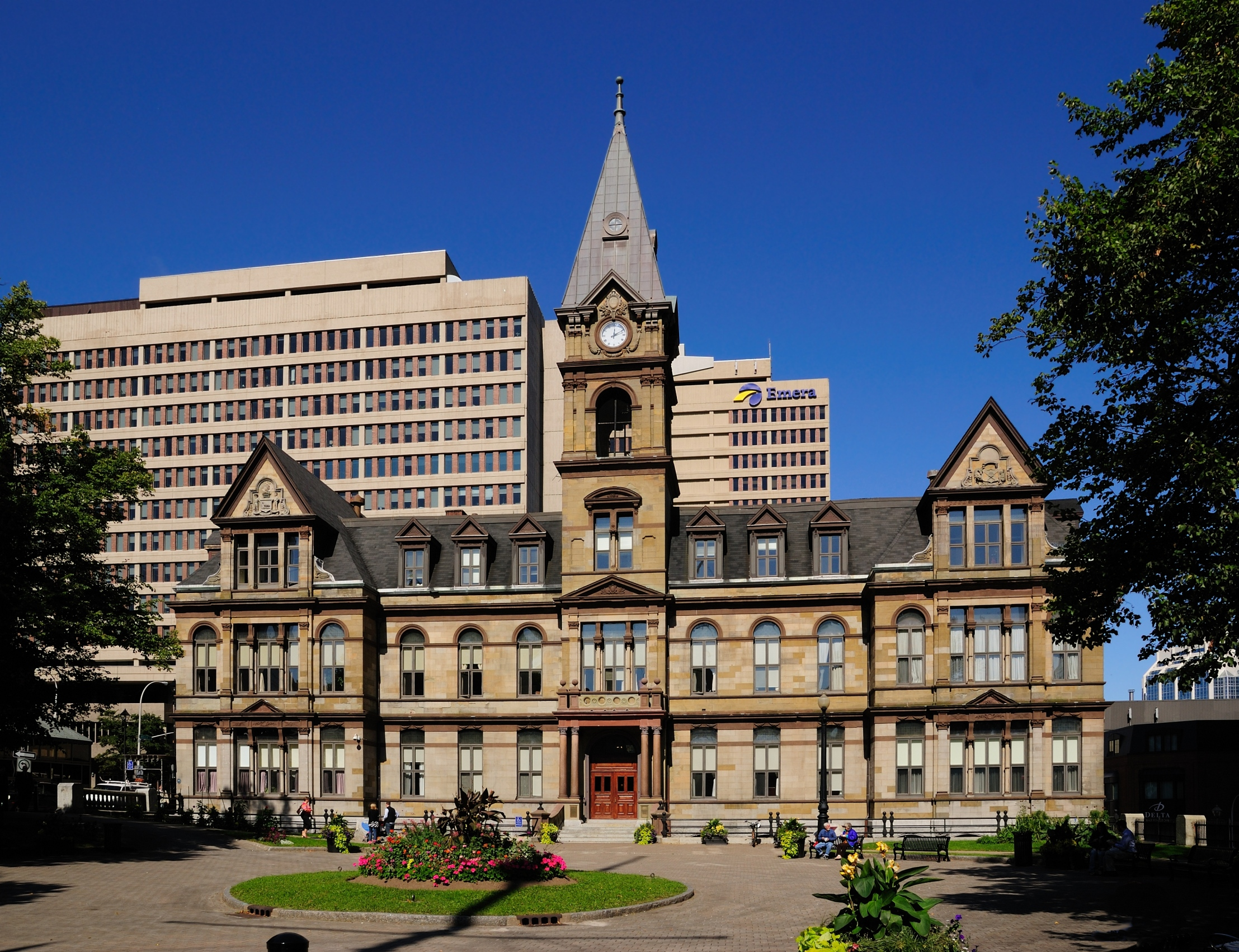
Halifax City Hall, the seat of municipal government

The Halifax Regional Municipality is governed by a mayor (elected at large) and a sixteen-person council. Councillors are elected by geographic district, with municipal elections occurring every four years. The current mayor of Halifax is Andy Fillmore. The Halifax Regional Council is responsible for all facets of municipal government, including the Halifax Regional Police, Halifax Public Libraries, Halifax Fire and Emergency, Halifax Regional Water Commission, parks and recreation, civic addressing, public works, waste management, and planning and development. The provincial legislation that provides governance oversight to the municipality is the Halifax Regional Municipality Charter. The municipality has a proposed operating budget of $869 million for 2015–2016.

The municipality also has four community councils that consider local matters. Each community council comprises five or six regional councillors representing neighbouring districts. Most community council decisions are subject to final approval by regional council.

As the capital of Nova Scotia, Halifax is also the meeting place of the Nova Scotia House of Assembly, the oldest assembly in Canada and the site of the first responsible government in British North America. The legislature meets in Province House, a nearly 200-year-old National Historic Site in downtown Halifax hailed as one of the finest examples of Palladian architecture in North America.

The municipality is represented in the House of Commons by six MPs, elected in the ridings of Halifax, Halifax West—Peggy's Cove, Dartmouth—Cole Harbour, Sackville—Bedford—Preston, South Shore—St. Margarets, and Central Nova. The latter two ridings also include rural areas outside the municipality.

== Education ==
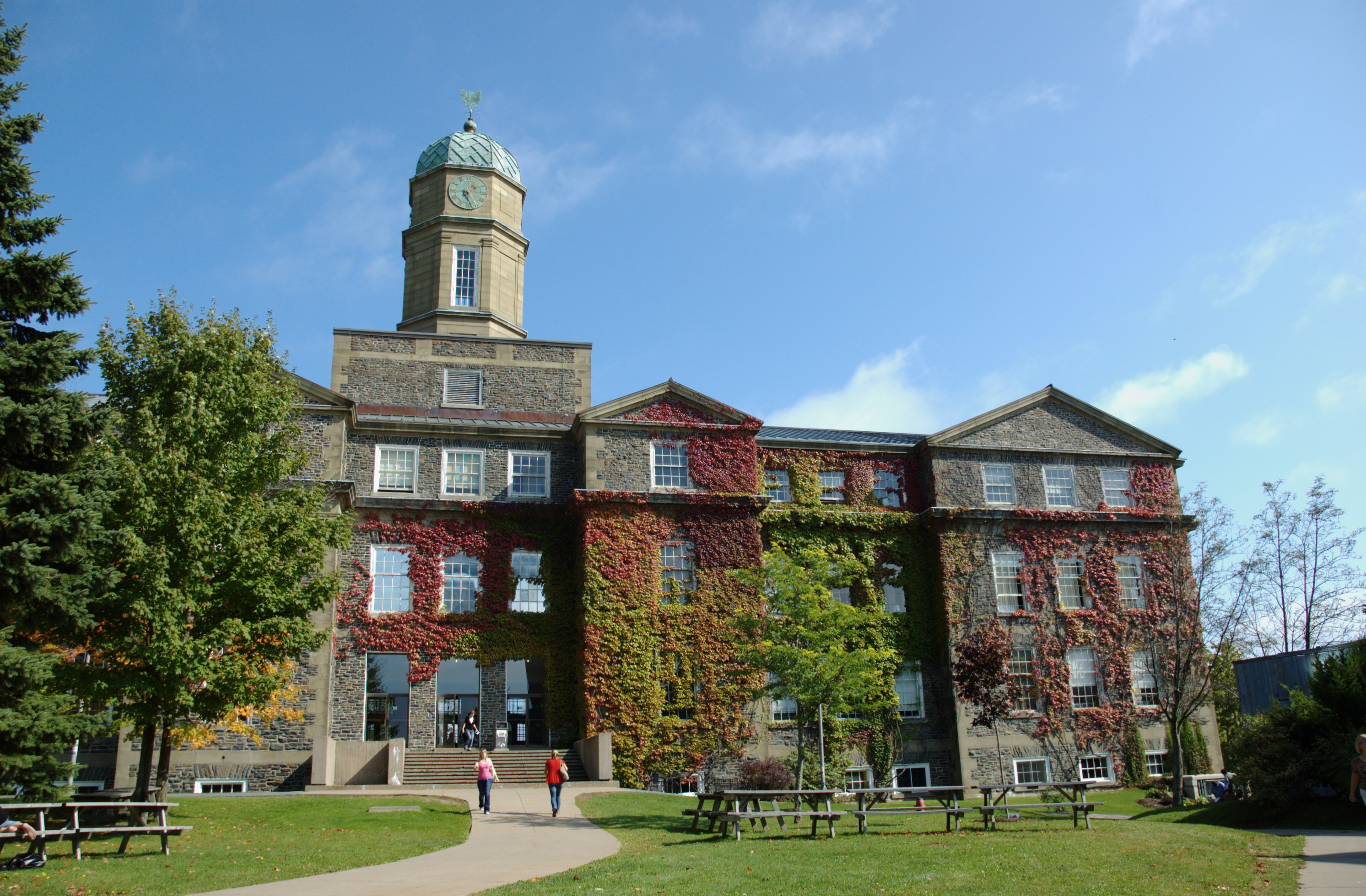
Established in 1818, Dalhousie University is among the oldest English-language post-secondary institutions in Canada.

Halifax has a well-developed network of public and private schools, providing instruction from grade pre-primary to grade twelve; 137 public schools are administered by the Halifax Regional Centre for Education, while eight public schools are administered by the Conseil scolaire acadien provincial. The municipality's fourteen private schools are operated independently.

== Transportation ==
=== Air ===
Halifax Stanfield International Airport serves Halifax and most of the province, providing scheduled flights to domestic and international destinations. The airport served 4,140,484 passengers in 2025, making it Canada's eighth busiest airport by passenger traffic. Shearwater, part of CFB Halifax, is the air base for maritime helicopters employed by the Royal Canadian Navy and is located on the eastern side of Halifax Harbour.

=== Cycling ===
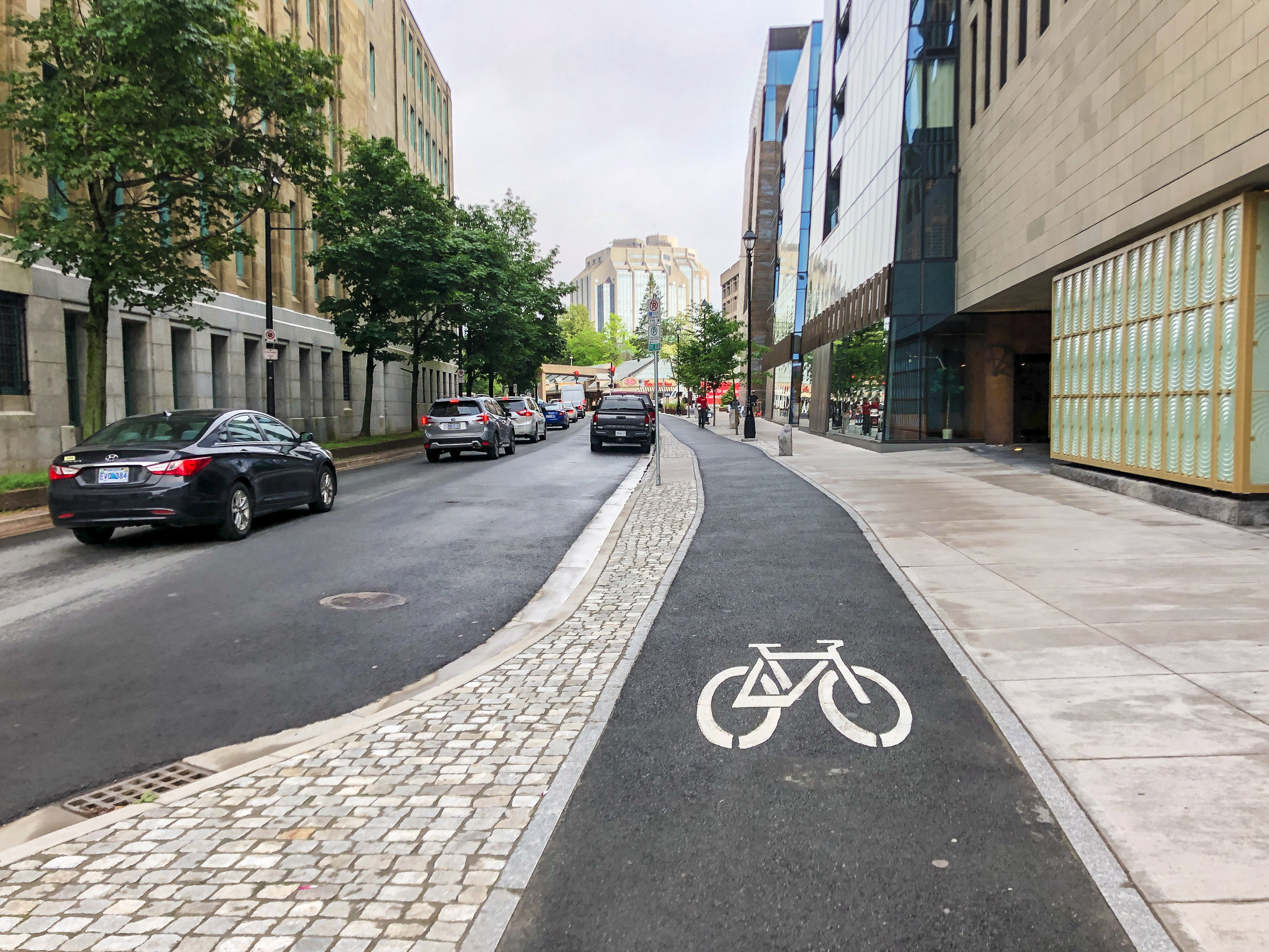
Dedicated bike lane in downtown Halifax

In recent years, the municipality has also begun to place increased emphasis on developing bicycling infrastructure. Halifax has developed 100 km (62 mi) of bikeways, 89 km (55 mi) of which are dedicated bicycle lanes.

=== Road ===
The urban core is linked by the Angus L. Macdonald and A. Murray MacKay suspension bridges, as well as the network of 100-series highways which function as expressways. Furthermore, Nova Scotia Trunk 7 and Nova Scotia Trunk 2 serve as major road in the area. Nova Scotia Highway 111 serves as a partial northwestern beltway of the city.

=== Public transit ===
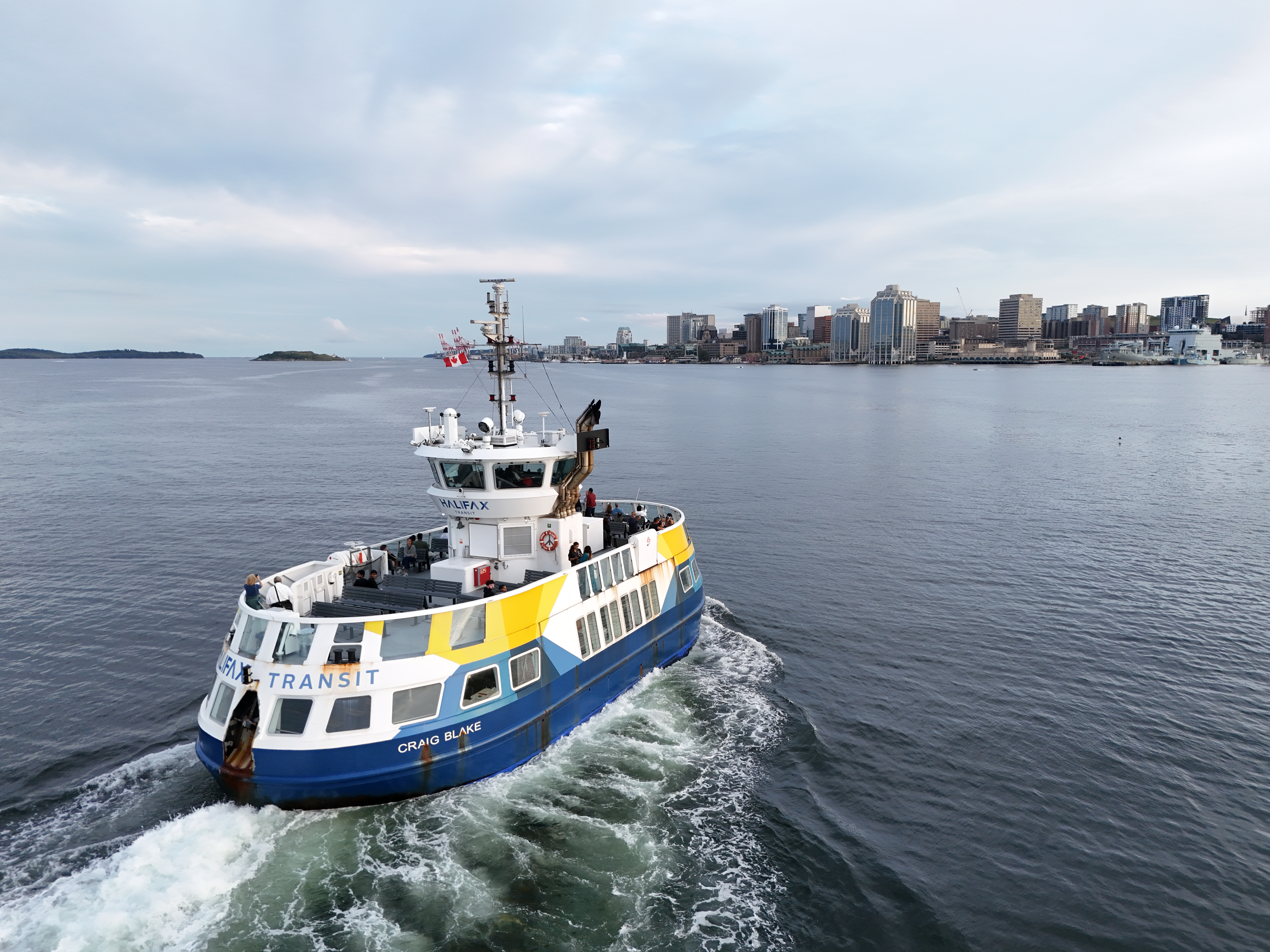
Halifax Transit ferry, Craig Blake, departing from Dartmouth, Nova Scotia, Canada.

Public transit is provided by Halifax Transit, which operates standard bus routes, regional express bus routes, as well as the pedestrian-only Halifax-Dartmouth Ferry Service. Established in 1752, the municipality's ferry service is the oldest continuously running salt water ferry service in North America.

=== Rail ===
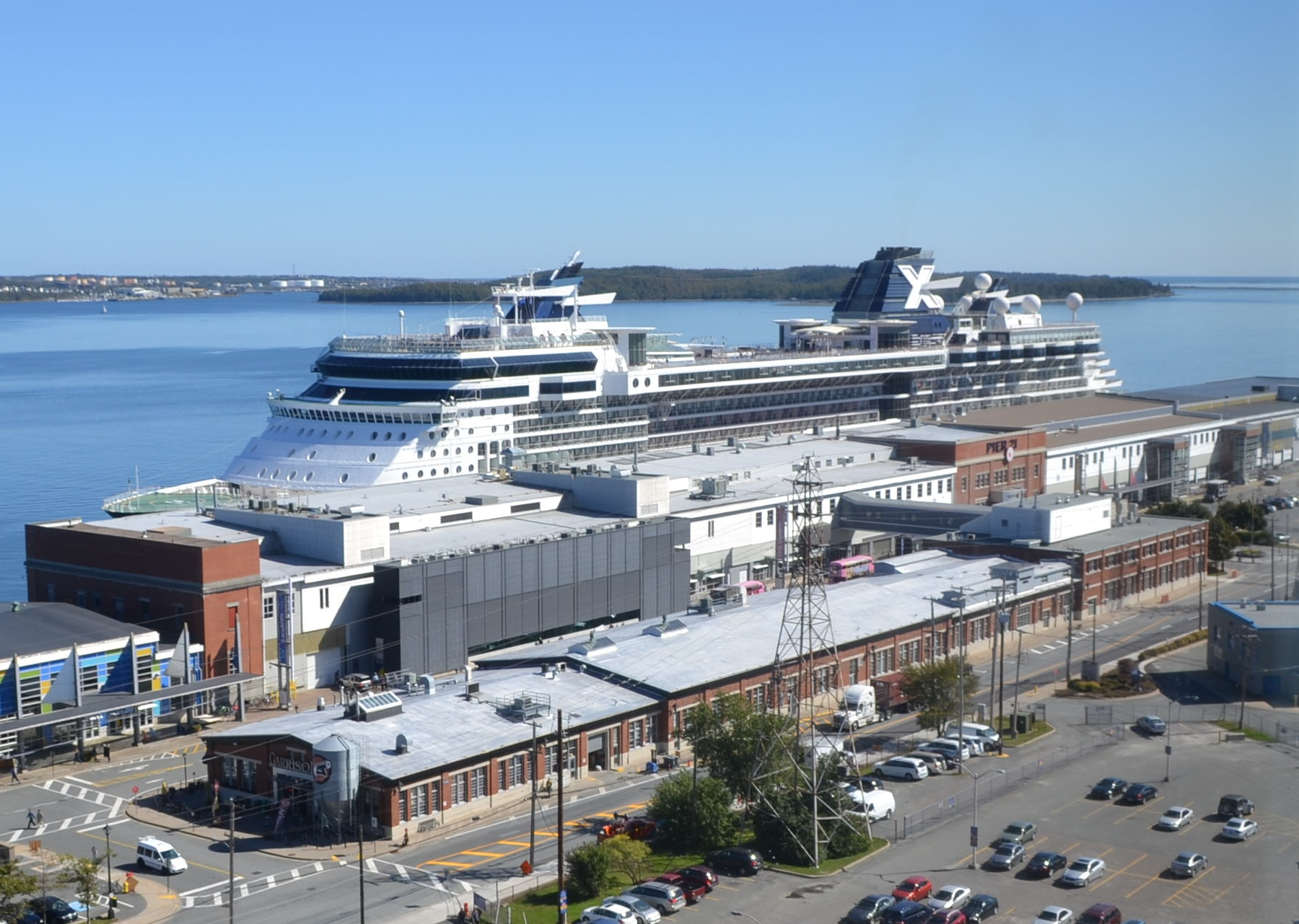
The Port of Halifax is North America's first inbound and last outbound shipping gateway to Europe.

The Halifax Port Authority's various shipping terminals constitute the eastern terminus of Canadian National Railway's transcontinental network. Via Rail Canada provides overnight passenger rail service from the Halifax Railway Station three days a week to Montreal with the Ocean, a train equipped with sleeper cars that stops in major centres along the way, such as Moncton. The Halifax Railway Station also serves as the terminus for Maritime Bus, which serves destinations across the Maritimes.

=== Water ===
Halifax Harbour is a major port used by numerous shipping lines, administered by the Halifax Port Authority. The Royal Canadian Navy and the Canadian Coast Guard have major installations along prominent sections of coastline in both Halifax and Dartmouth. The harbour is also home to a public ferry service connecting downtown Halifax to two locations in Dartmouth, with plans in development to add an additional ferry route connecting downtown and Bedford by 2028.

Sheet Harbour is the other major port in the municipality and serves industrial users on the Eastern Shore.

== Sister cities ==
- Hakodate, Japan (1982). The cities chose to twin because they both have star forts and are both maritime ports. Halifax has donated many fir trees to the annual Hakodate Christmas Fantasy festival.
- Campeche, Mexico (1999). Campeche was chosen because, like Halifax, it is "a capital of a state" and is "a city of similar size to Halifax on or near the coast having rich historical tradition".
- Norfolk, Virginia, United States (2006). Norfolk was chosen because, like Halifax, its economy "depends heavily on the presence of the Armed Forces, and both cities are very proud of their military history".
- Portsmouth, England (2023). Halifax and Portsmouth signed a sister city agreement in early 2023. They chose to twin as both cities are historic naval and shipbuilding centres. Additionally, both cities are centres for university education.

== See also ==
- List of people from the Halifax Regional Municipality
  - Poet Laureate of Halifax, Nova Scotia
- Amalgamation of the Halifax Regional Municipality
- Boston–Halifax relations – Alliance between US and Canada
- Halifax Explosion – 1917 maritime disaster in Halifax, Nova Scotia, Canada
- Halifax Town Clock
- List of municipalities in Nova Scotia
