= Boston–Halifax relations =

Alliance between US and Canada

Relations between Boston, Massachusetts, United States, and Halifax, Nova Scotia, Canada, date to the founding of Halifax in 1749, when Boston businesses had an interest in the new settlement for shipping and fish trade. The bond between the two cities became stronger after the Halifax Explosion in 1917, after Boston sent aid and disaster relief to Halifax. Boston, which is the capital of Massachusetts (the most populous state in the New England region), is the most populous city in New England. Likewise, Halifax, which is the capital of Nova Scotia (the most populous province in the Atlantic Canada region), is the most populous city in Atlantic Canada. New England and Atlantic Canada border each other by land and sea along the Canada–United States border. Boston and Halifax are both major port cities on the Atlantic Ocean.

== Halifax Explosion ==
On December 6, 1917, at 9:04.35 a.m., the Halifax Explosion destroyed much of the city. Boston authorities learned of the disaster via telegraph, and quickly organized and dispatched a relief train around 10 p.m. to help survivors. A blizzard after the explosion delayed the train, which arrived in the early morning on December 8, and immediately began distributing food, water, and medical supplies. Many personnel on the train were able to relieve the Nova Scotia medical staff, most of whom had worked without rest since the explosion occurred.

== Christmas Tree tradition ==
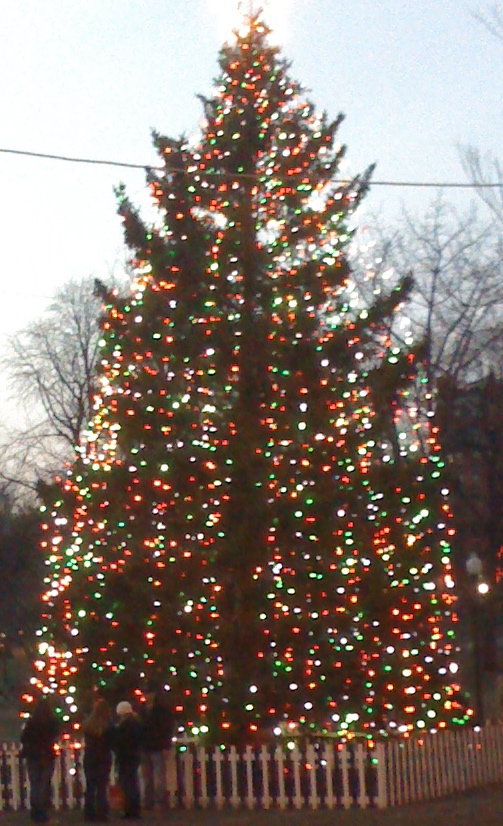
Boston's tree in 2010.

In 1918, Halifax sent a Christmas tree to the City of Boston in thanks and remembrance for the help that the Boston Red Cross and the Massachusetts Public Safety Committee had provided immediately after the disaster. That gift was revived in 1971 by the Lunenburg County Christmas Tree Producers Association, who began an annual donation of a large tree to promote Christmas tree exports as well as to acknowledge Boston's support after the explosion. The gift was later taken over by the Nova Scotia Government to continue the goodwill gesture as well as to promote trade and tourism.

The tree is Boston's official Christmas tree and is lit on Boston Common throughout the holiday season. Knowing its symbolic importance to both cities, the Nova Scotia Department of Natural Resources has specific guidelines for selecting the tree. It must be an attractive balsam fir, white spruce or red spruce, 12 to 16 metres (40 to 50 ft) tall, healthy with good colour, medium to heavy density, uniform and symmetrical and easy to access.

For the Christmas tree extension specialist in charge of locating it, the "tree can be elusive, the demands excessive, and the job requires remembering the locations of the best specimens in the province and persuading the people who own them to give them up for a pittance." Most donors are "honoured to give up their trees... [and] most will gladly watch their towering trees fall" since everyone knows the reason it is being sent to Boston. The trees don't often come from tree farms, but instead from open land where they can grow tall and full. It is so important to the people of Nova Scotia that "people have cried over it, argued about it, even penned song lyrics in its honor."

== Tourism ==
Travel between Halifax and Boston is common, particularly in the summer months. A ferry service runs between Bar Harbor, Maine and Yarmouth, Nova Scotia taking cars and passengers across the Gulf of Maine. There are also regular direct flights between Boston's Logan International Airport and Halifax's Stanfield International Airport.

== Trade and commerce ==
There is a thrice-weekly train run by Pan Am Railways and the New Brunswick Southern Railway dubbed The Bluenose. Freight is run by Canadian National Railway from the port of Halifax to Saint John, New Brunswick, where it is then transferred to the New Brunswick Southern to be sent to Pan Am in Waterville, Maine. From there, freight is sent to an intermodal facility in Worcester, Massachusetts for distribution in Greater Boston or further transfer to CSX Transportation.

The Hibernia Atlantic, a submarine communications cable, runs from Boston to Halifax via landing points in Lynn, Massachusetts and Herring Cove, Nova Scotia with a capacity of 10.6 terabytes per second. The cable continues across the Atlantic Ocean to connect the United States, Canada, Ireland, the United Kingdom, and Europe.

== Sports ==
Many Nova Scotians (and Haligonians in particular) identify as supporters of Boston's major professional sports league teams. After the Boston Red Sox won the 2007 World Series, the trophy was brought to Halifax for two days. The Stanley Cup, the Larry O'Brien Trophy, and the Vince Lombardi Trophy have also been brought to Halifax by, respectively, Bruins, Celtics, and Patriots players. In 1983, the Patriots sold their old scoreboard at a discounted price to the owners of the region's Canadian Football League expansion franchise, although the team folded before ever taking the field after funding for a stadium fell through.

== TV and radio ==
Many Halifax residents can receive Boston TV stations, including WGBH-TV, WBZ-TV, WCVB-TV, WBTS-CD, WSBK-TV and WFXT, on TV providers like Eastlink and Bell Aliant Fibe. WLVI was the only Boston affiliate of a major English-language U.S. broadcast network not available on most cable systems in the Halifax area. Some Boston market radio stations can also be received in the Halifax area.

WHDH-TV was served by cable and satellite viewers from 1996 to 2017, replacing WLBZ-TV when all Bangor TV stations were removed from cable because of arguments with Canadian commercials on Bangor TV.

== See also ==
- Canada–United States relations
- Canadian Consulate-General, Boston
