= Argyle Street (Halifax) =

Street in downtown Halifax, Nova Scotia, Canada

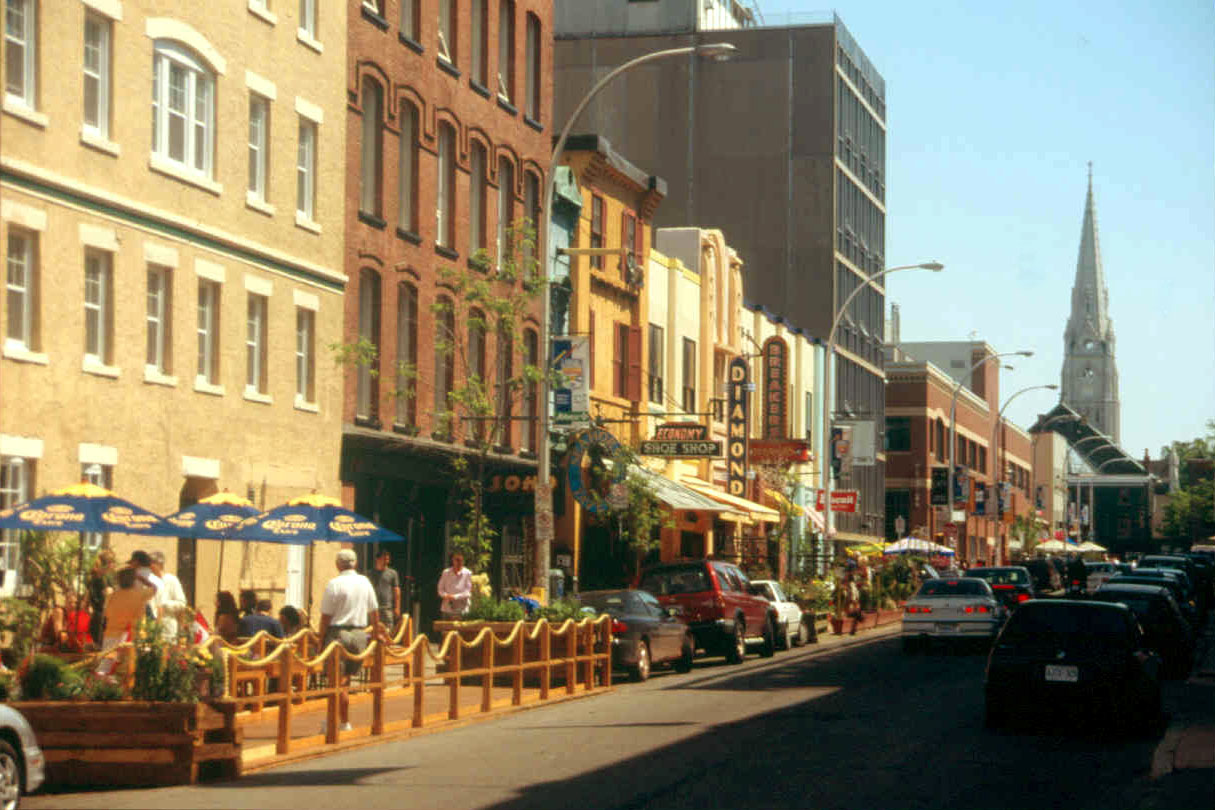
Bars and restaurants on Argyle Street, before the streetscaping project

Argyle Street is located in downtown Halifax, Nova Scotia, Canada. It is approximately 460 metres long and stretches four city blocks to the west of, and parallel to, Barrington Street from Duke Street to Blowers Street. The street is a popular centre for live music, nightlife, theatre, and al fresco dining.

== History ==
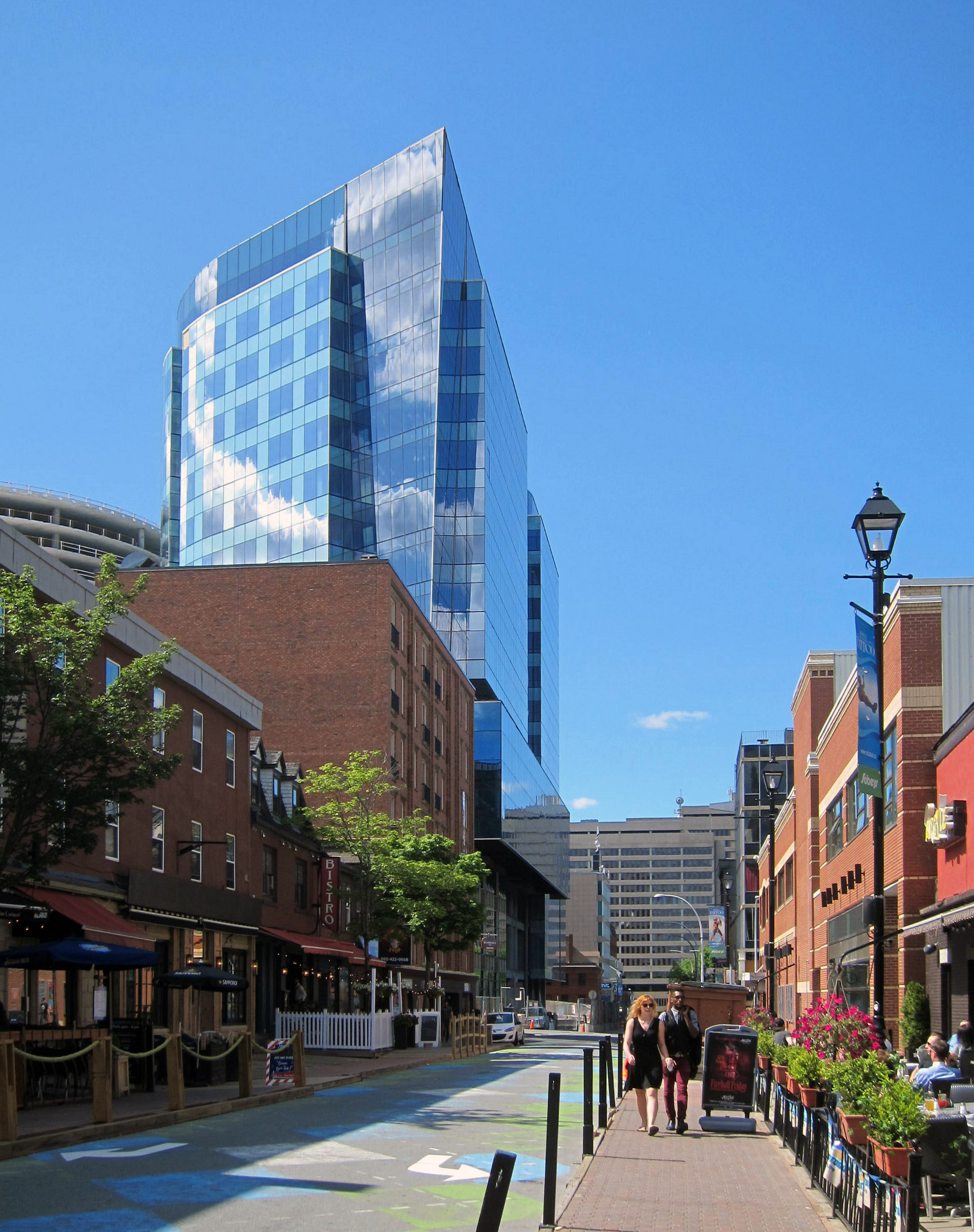
Argyle Street before the streetscaping project, showing temporary walkways created to make room for sidewalk cafés. This arrangement is no longer necessary following the 2016-17 streetscape improvement project.

When British settlers arrived in 1749, they drew out a map plan that included the layout of Argyle Street. It was reportedly named after the Duke of Argyll of the so-called Broad Bottom ministry, but was misspelled. It formerly ran two blocks north of its present terminus, but this portion was covered by the Scotia Square urban renewal project in the 1960s, which saw several city blocks consolidated to facilitate the construction of an introverted shopping, office, and hotel complex.

The culture of sidewalk cafés in downtown Halifax originated in the 1990s on Argyle Street. During the 1995 G7 summit, a vacant lot opposite the Grand Parade was turned into a successful outdoor "International Café". This spurred enthusiasm for outdoor dining in downtown Halifax, and a pilot sidewalk café was opened on Argyle Street the same year. The municipality developed a formal policy to facilitate sidewalk cafés in May 1997, and more such cafés were established on a seasonal basis on Argyle Street and elsewhere in the downtown area. Sidewalk cafés contributed to increased pedestrian numbers in downtown Halifax and are considered to have improved both the liveability and tourism appeal of the area. They are now encouraged by both the city's regional plan and cultural plan.

== Streetscaping project ==
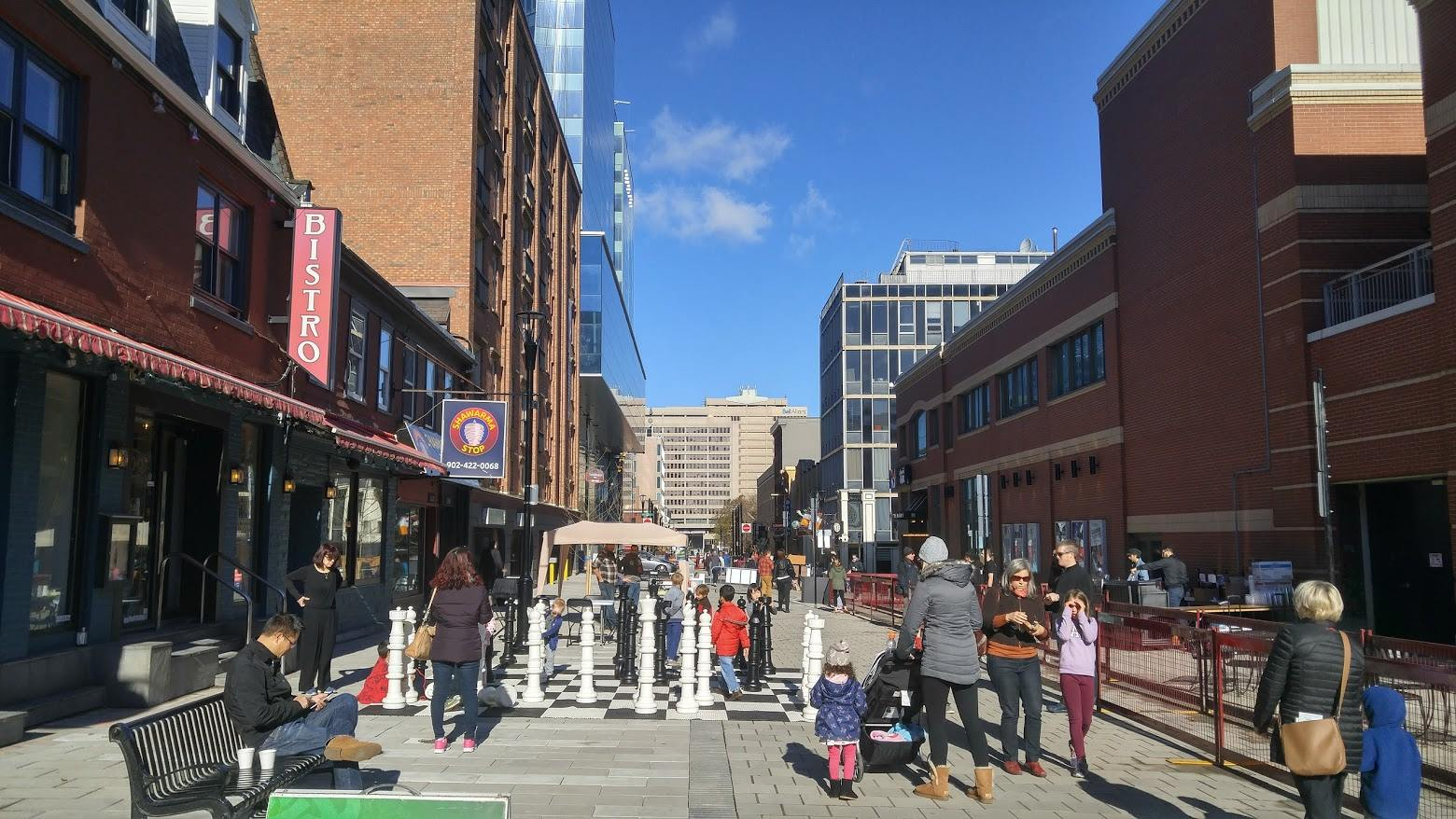
Argyle Street in November 2017, following the streetscape improvement project

=== Pilot project ===
An effort has been made in recent years to improve the streetscape of the southern half of Argyle Street. In March 2015, regional council approved a pilot project to widen the pedestrian right-of-way and paint the street a bright blue Argyle pattern. City planners and business owners hoped the efforts would improve walkability and attract more people to the area. The pilot project was implemented in July 2015.

=== Permanent redesign ===
Following the pilot project, the same section of Argyle Street was completely reconstructed (along with part of Grafton Street) as an "urban plaza". Ekistics Plan + Design out of Dartmouth, NS, was engaged for the detailed design of the project. The conventional asphalt and sidewalk were replaced with high-quality pavers, and the street was made level with few curbs. The street remained one-way, as it had before. The pedestrian zone was widened, allowing businesses to keep furniture outdoors year-round and obviating the need for the previous temporary boardwalks. A city planner explained that the project would support the entertainment industry, improve the pedestrian environment, and increase the number of trees along the street. The street remains open to traffic but can be closed to allow for outdoor concerts, festivals, and other events. It functions similar to a shared space, an urban design approach that seeks to minimize segregation between different modes of transportation.

Construction was carried out during the summer of 2017. Some businesses complained about the disruption, as sidewalk patios could not be permitted as usual that year. In response, Mayor Mike Savage and Councillor Waye Mason emphasized the "long-term gain" of the new streetscape and stated that the city would get construction done as quickly as possible.

The final paver was installed in a ceremonial street party on Saturday, 4 November 2017, with live music, beer, and games. The street was subsequently reopened to vehicular traffic. In the Best of Halifax reader's choice awards, held annually by The Coast, the project won the silver award in the "Best Effort to Improve Halifax" category.

== Landmarks ==
Ordered from north to south:

- World Trade and Convention Centre (WTCC) – Halifax's main convention venue from 1984 to 2017
- Halifax City Hall
- Grand Parade – the city's central square
- St. Paul's Church – Halifax's oldest building
- The Carleton
- Halifax Convention Centre – replaced the WTCC
- Residence Inn by Marriott
- Neptune Theatre – the largest professional theatre company in Atlantic Canada

== See also ==
- Barrington Street
- Spring Garden Road
