= Downtown Halifax =

- Central business district
- Downtown Halifax as from Halifax Harbour
- Interactive map of Downtown Halifax
- Coordinates: 44°38′54.4″N 63°34′23.8″W
- Country: Canada
- Province: Nova Scotia
- Municipality: Halifax Regional Municipality
- Community: Halifax
- Community council: Halifax and West
- Municipal District: Halifax South Downtown

Area
  - Total: 4.1 km^{2} (1.6 sq mi)

Population (2021)
  - Total: 25,555
  - Density: 6,200/km^{2} (16,000/sq mi)
- Canadian Postal code: B3J
- Area codes: 782, 902
- Website: downtownhalifax.ca

Downtown Halifax is the primary central business district of the Municipality of Halifax. Located on the central-eastern portion of the Halifax Peninsula, on Halifax Harbour. Along with Downtown Dartmouth, and other de facto central business districts within the Municipality (e.g. Cole Harbour, Lower Sackville, Spryfield), Downtown Halifax serves as the business, entertainment, and tourism hub of the region.

== Geography ==
Downtown is located within the central-eastern portion of the Halifax Peninsula. The terrain varies from 0 m (0 ft) on the harbour's edge, to about 74 m (243 ft) atop Citadel Hill (Fort George).

Sourced from Defining Canada’s Downtown Neighbourhoods: 2016 Boundaries, Downtown Halifax covers 410 ha (1,000 acres) of landmass.

== Culture ==
=== Events and festivals ===
The Scotiabank Centre is one of the largest buildings in Downtown Halifax, as well as the largest arena in Atlantic Canada. It is the home of the Halifax Mooseheads hockey team, and it also plays host to most of the major sporting events and concerts that visit Halifax. The Nova Scotia International Tattoo is held here every year. It is connected to the Downtown Halifax Link, and directly to the World Trade and Convention Centre. The Atlantic Film Festival, Atlantic Jazz Festival and the Halifax Pop Explosion also take place in some downtown venues.

The Halifax Convention Centre offers more than 120,000 square feet (11,000 m^{2}) of space for meetings and events.

== Demographics ==
Statistics Canada's 2021 Census article Table 5 Population by proximity to downtown, census metropolitan areas, 2016 to 2021 recorded 25,555 people who lived within Downtown Halifax.

From 2016 to 2021, the population increased by 5,288 people (an increase of over 26%) from the 2016 population of 20,267 people.

Furthermore, the population density of the area increased from approximately 49 people per hectare in 2016 to approximately 62 people per hectare in 2021. Between 2016 and 2021, Downtown Halifax's population fastest compared to all other Downtowns in Canada.

Historical Downtown population
Year	Pop.	±%
2016	20,267	—
2021	25,555	+26.1%

== Economy ==
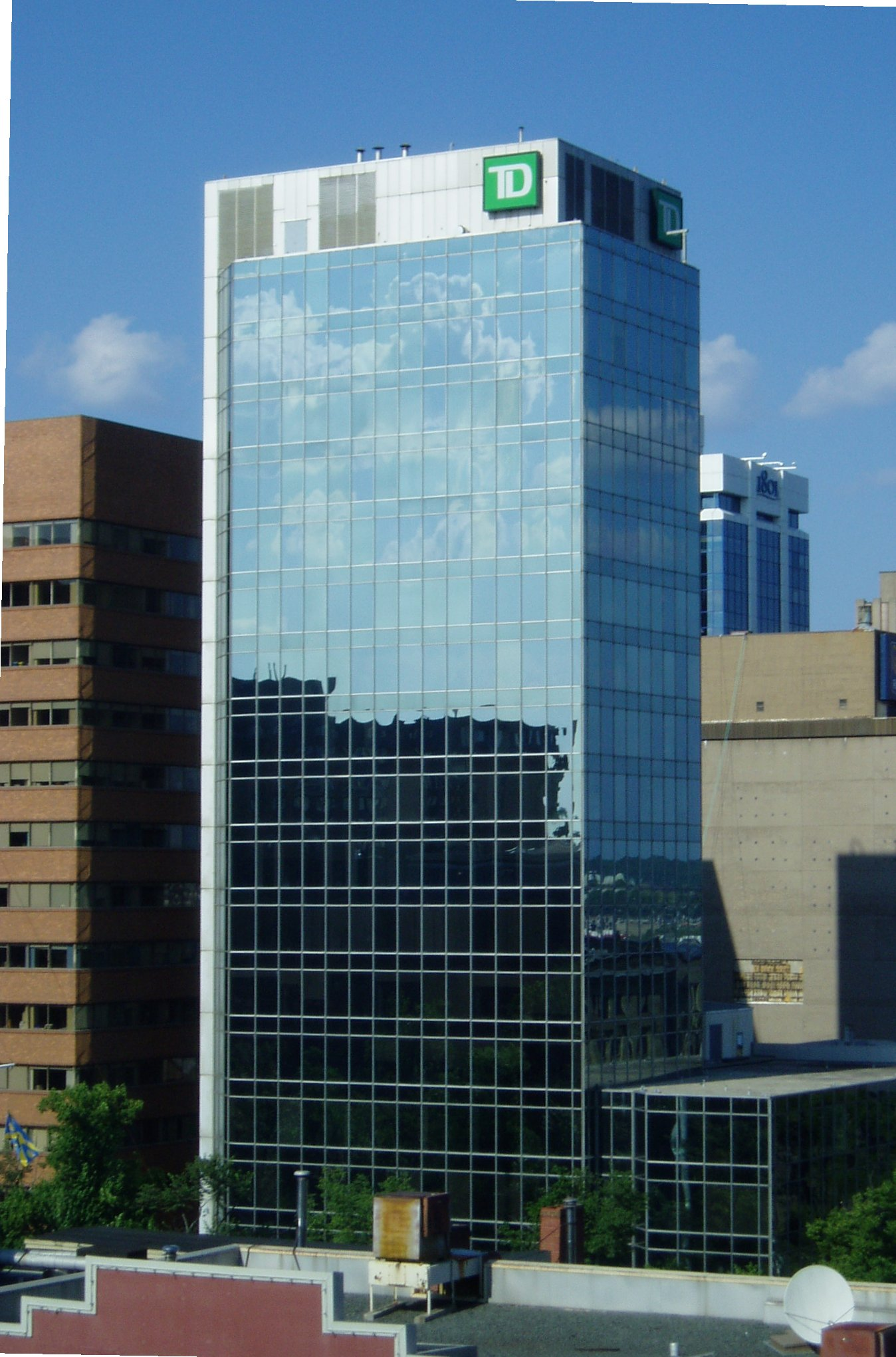
TD Centre on Barrington and George Street.

Downtown Halifax, like the municipality and the urban area, has a diverse economy. Many Crown corporations, non-governmental organizations, and private-sector organizations, have corporate headquarters, and/or do business within downtown. As a downtown in Atlantic Canada, that is encompassed by the municipality and urban area within Atlantic Canada, Downtown Halifax is an area that hosts many industries.

=== Financial services ===
Downtown Halifax is the financial centre of the urban area of Halifax, the Province of Nova Scotia, and the region of Atlantic Canada. The Bank of Canada has one of its five Canadian regional offices located within the central business district, and all Big Five Canadian banks have major operations within the area. Manulife, along with many other private financial institutions, also do business within downtown.

=== Gambling ===
Nova Scotia Gaming Corporation operates its headquarters at 1601 Lower Water Street.

=== Marketing communications ===
Trampoline is located within the area.

=== Telecommunication ===
Eastlink, a cable television and telecommunications company is headquartered within the vicinity.

=== Transportation ===
Maritime Bus operates a station within the district.

=== Utilities ===
Emera, the Canadian successor holding company, is headquartered in Downtown Halifax. Its Nova Scotia subsidiary, Nova Scotia Power, used to be a Provincial Crown corporation until Progressive Conservative Party of Nova Scotia leader Donald Cameron privatized the company in 1992.

== Parks and recreation ==
Downtown Halifax has an array of attractions, a plethora of events-and-festivals, and many restaurants.

=== Accommodation ===
Many of the Halifax region's hotels are located in the downtown area, with many major hotel chains maintaining a location here. There are also a number of small hostels nearby.

Hotels within Downtown

- Cambridge Suites
- Courtyard by Marriott (125 rooms)
- Delta Barrington
- Delta Halifax
- Four Points by Sheraton Halifax
- The Halliburton
- Hampton Inn by Hilton
- Homewood Suites by Hilton
- Marriott Halifax Harbourfront (formerly Casino Nova Scotia Hotel & Sheraton)
- Marriott Residence Inn
- The Prince George Hotel
- Radisson Suite Hotel Halifax
- The Lord Nelson Hotel & Suites
- Westin Nova Scotian

=== Art galleries ===
There are several art galleries within the Downtown Halifax area:

- Argyle Fine Art
- Art 1274 Hollis
- Centre for Craft Nova Scotia
- Anna Leonowens Gallery
- Khyber Centre for the Arts
- Port Loggia Gallery
- Karl Penton Gallery
- The Prow Gallery
- Studio 21 Fine Art
- Teichert Gallery
- Zwicker's Gallery

=== Landmarks ===
==== Boardwalk ====
The Halifax Waterfront Boardwalk runs along the harbour from Casino Nova Scotia in the northern-part of Downtown-to-the Canadian Museum of Immigration at Pier 21 in the southern-part of Downtown. It is a 24-hour public footpath, and at 4 km (2.5 mi) in length, it is one of the longest urban footpaths in the world.

==== Old Town Clock ====
On 20 October 1803, Halifax's town clock started keeping time. Located off Brunswick Street, the clock faces the harbour and is another example of Palladian architecture within the urban area of Halifax.

==== Citadel Hill ====
Citadel Hill, a 22.6-hectare (56-acre) star-shaped fort, is another historic attraction in the downtown. Originally established with the arrival of Edward Cornwallis and the out break of Father Le Loutre's War (1749), the current fort was built in the Victorian Era as the hub of the historic defence system for the port. As a result, there is viewplane legislation that restricts vertical development that might block the direct line of sight from Citadel Hill to the harbour and George's Island in particular. Recent developments have challenged the viewplane limits.

==== Province House ====
Finished construction in 1819, Province House is a fantastic example of Palladian architecture in North America.

==== Granville Mall ====
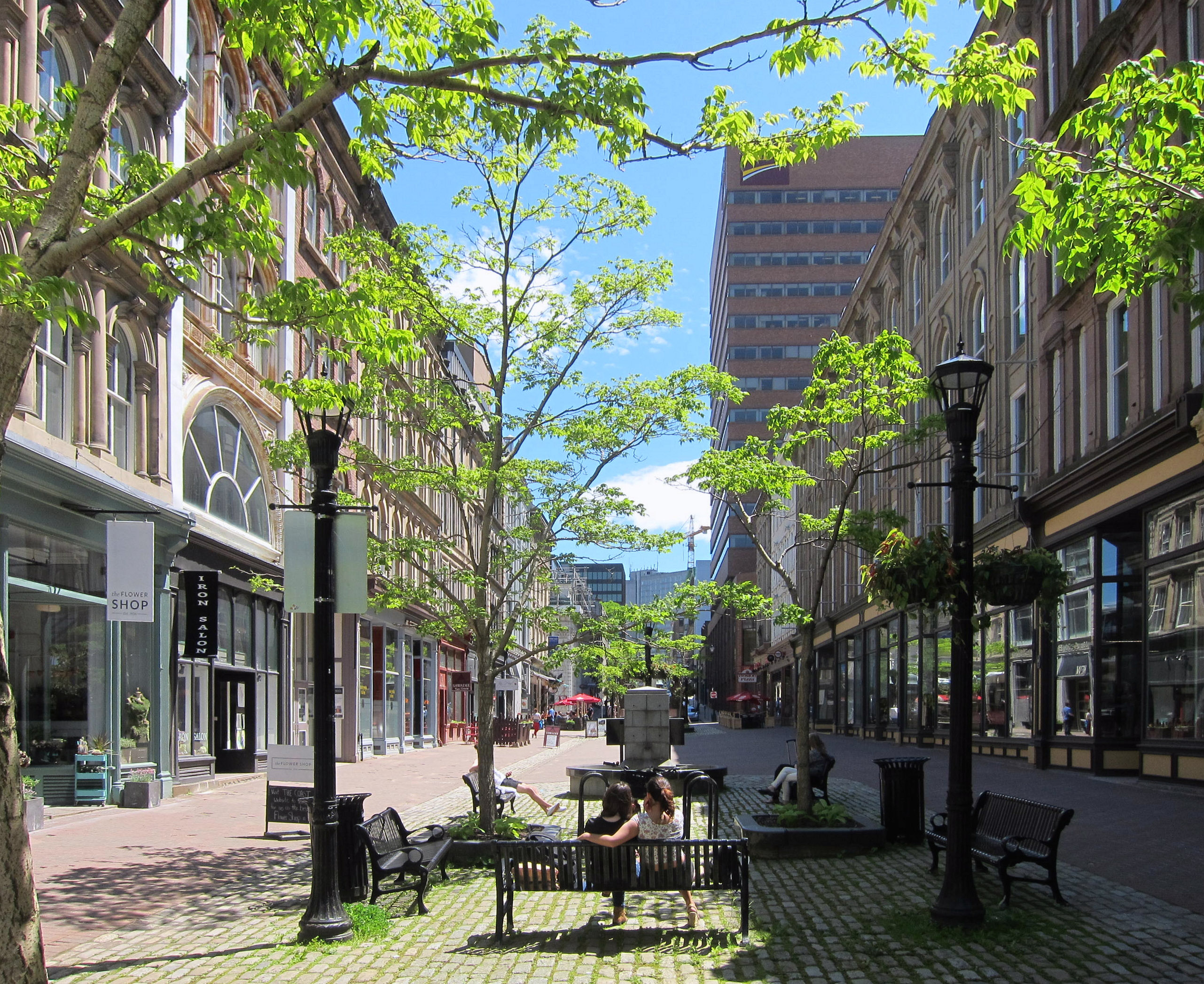
Granville Mall is a pedestrian mall surrounded by Victorian era buildings.

One of the few blocks to have retained its heritage character is Granville Mall, a pedestrian mall formerly part of Granville Street, made up of an array of shops and pubs in a conglomeration of rowed historic buildings built in the 1860s. It is known for the stone facades on each building. Historic Properties, a collection of 19th-century warehouses converted into shops and restaurants, is located nearby. Despite the heritage focus of these remaining blocks of heritage buildings, none are protected as heritage districts.

=== Museums ===
Downtown Halifax hosts several museums, including:

- Canadian Museum of Immigration at Pier 21
- Maritime Museum of the Atlantic
- Nova Scotia Museum of Natural History
- Sea Turtle Centre

Pier 21, an immigrant entry point prominent throughout the 1930s, 1940s, and 1950s, was opened to the public as a National Historic Site of Canada in 1999. The Maritime Museum of the Atlantic is a maritime museum containing extensive galleries including a large exhibit on the Titanic, over 70 small craft and a 200-foot (61 m) steamship CSS Acadia. In summertime the preserved World War II corvette HMCS Sackville operates as a museum ship and Canada's naval memorial. The Art Gallery of Nova Scotia is housed in a 150-year-old building containing over 9,000 works of art.

=== Parks ===
There are a number of parks within the urban setting of Downtown Halifax.

- Citadel Hill off-leash dog park
- Halifax Commons
- Halifax Public Gardens
- Peace and Friendship Park
- Victoria Park

=== Restaurants and nightlife ===
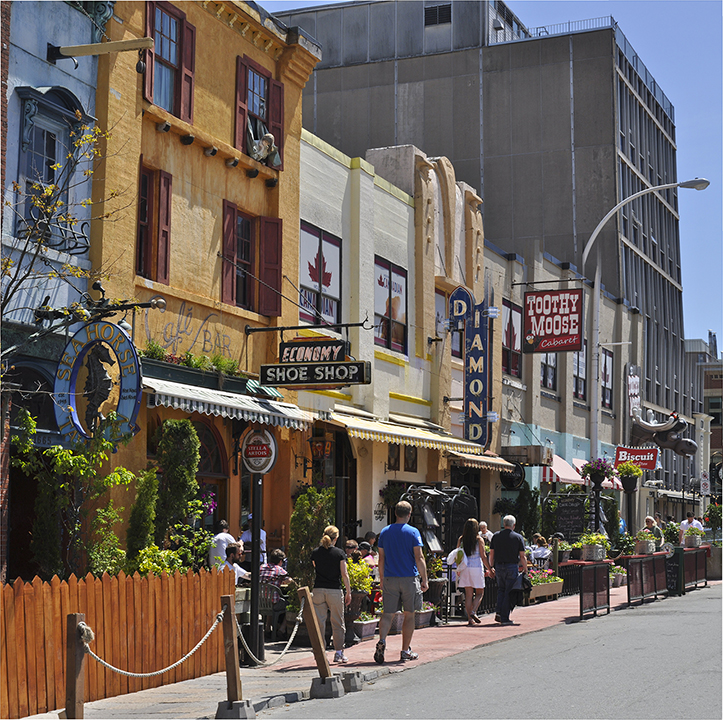
Bars on Argyle Street. Downtown Halifax is home to approximately 200 restaurants and bars.

The area is home to approximately 200 restaurants and bars, providing an interesting array of world cuisine. There are also over 60 sidewalk cafes that open in the summer months. The nightlife is made up of bars and small music venues as well as Casino Nova Scotia, a large facility built partially over the water. Pizza Corner, located at the intersection of Blowers Street and Grafton Street, is a common location for pizzerias serving Halifax-style donairs and other street food for the neighbouring bars and pubs.

=== Shopping ===
Downtown Halifax, being home to many small shops and vendors, is a major shopping area in the Municipality of Halifax. Notable retail areas include Park Lane, Spring Garden Road and Scotia Square.

=== Theatre ===
Neptune Theatre, located on Argyle Street, is Halifax's largest theatre with a 458-person capacity. Since 1 July 1963, it has performed, and performs an assortment of professionally produced plays year-round.

The Shakespeare by the Sea theatre company performs at nearby Point Pleasant Park.

Although not in Downtown Halifax, the Eastern Front Theatre performs at Alderney Landing in Downtown Dartmouth which is accessible from the area via the Halifax Transit ferry service.

=== Venues ===
==== Nova Centre ====
Completed in 2017, the Nova Centre is Halifax's premier conference centre, and has over 11,000 m^{2} (120,000 sq ft) of event space.

==== Scotiabank Centre ====
Formerly, and colloquially, known as the Halifax Metro Centre, the Scotiabank Centre was opened on 17 February 1978. It has a concert-capacity of up-to 13,000-people, and has hosted bands-and-musicians, comedians, multi-sport events and motivational speakers.

== Government ==
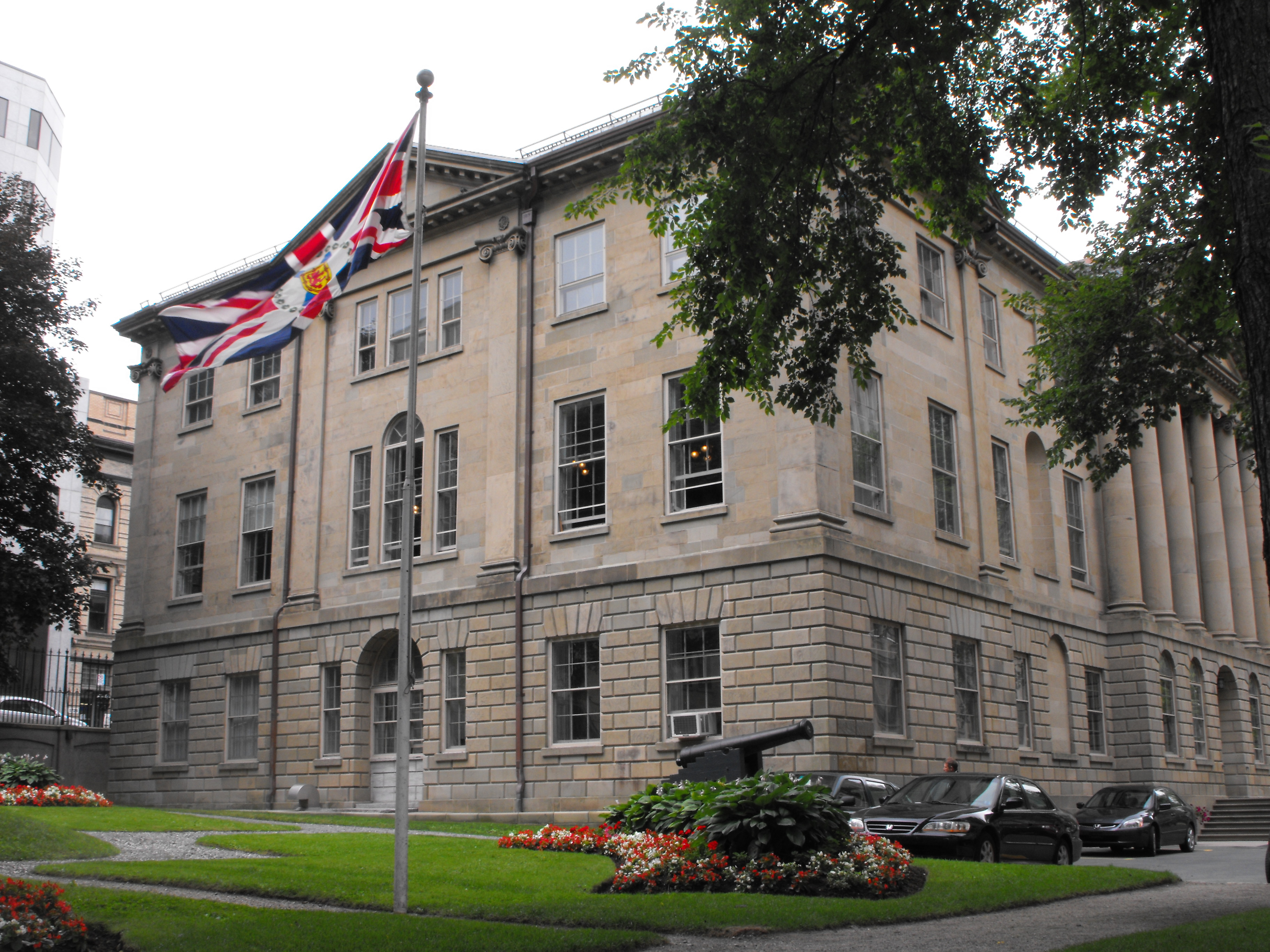
Downtown Halifax is home to Province House, home of the Nova Scotia House of Assembly.

Downtown Halifax is the home of the Halifax Regional Council chamber at Halifax City Hall. Offices for the mayor, city councillors, and additional staff can also be found downtown.

At the provincial level, the downtown area is the home of Nova Scotia's Province House where the Nova Scotia House of Assembly meets. Government House, where the Lieutenant-Governor resides, is located on Barrington Street. The provincial government also has offices in several other downtown office buildings.

Canada's federal government also maintains a significant presence in the area, working from various buildings including the Dominion Public Building, the Ralston Building, and previously, the Maritime Centre.

== Transportation ==
=== Pedestrian ===
Streets within Downtown Halifax are set in a grid-pattern. Downtown Halifax is similar to other central business districts where it has many varied crosswalks, hills, paths, and sidewalks.

Spring Garden Road is a street approximately 1,200 m (3,900 ft) in total-length that goes in an east-west direction from Barrington Street-to-Robie Street.

Barrington Street traverses approximately 1,500 m (4,900 ft) through Downtown in a north-south direction. Its total-length from Highway 111 in the North End-to-Inglis Street in the South End is approximately 7 km (4.3 mi).

=== Road ===
The streets in the downtown area are set in a grid pattern like the rest of the Halifax Peninsula, the way the town officials originally planned in the 18th century.

=== Public transit ===
Halifax Transit provides public transit routes from several points throughout Downtown Halifax via different modes of transport.

==== Bus routes ====
===== Lower Water Street terminal =====
- Route 2 (Fairview)
- Route 29 (Barrington)
- Route 90 (Larry Uteck)

===== Scotia Square terminal =====
- Route 1 (Spring Garden)
- Route 2 (Fairview)
- Route 5 (Scotia Square)
- Route 7 A (Peninsula) (clockwise)
- Route 7 B (Peninsula) (counter-clockwise)
- Route 8 (Sackville)
- Route 9 (Herring Cove)
- Route 10 (Dalhousie)
- Route 29 (Barrington)
- Route 84 (Glendale)
- Route 93 (Bedford Highway)
- Route 123 (Timberlea Express)
- Route 127 (Cowie Hill Express)
- Route 135 (Flamingo Express)
- Route 136 (Farnham Gate Express)
- Route 137 (Clayton Park Express)
- Route 138 (Parkland Express)
- Route 158 (Woodlawn Express)
- Route 159 (Colby Express)
- Route 161 (North Preston Express)
- Route 165 (Caldwell Express)
- Route 168 B (Cherry Brook Express)
- Route 182 (First Lake Express)
- Route 183 (Springfield Express)
- Route 185 (Millwood Express)
- Route 186 (Beaver Bank Express)
- Route 194 (West Bedford Express)
- Route 196 (Basinview Express)
- Route 320 (Airport/Fall River MetroX)
- Route 330 (Tantallon/Sheldrake Lake Regional Express)
- Route 370 (Porters Lake Regional Express)

==== Ferry routes ====
===== Lower Water Street terminal =====
- Alderney (Downtown Dartmouth)
- Woodside (Woodside)

== See also ==
- Downtown Halifax Link
- Kate Carmichael
- The Khyber
- Texpark site
