= Twisted Sisters =

Twisted Sisters may refer to:

- Twisted Sisters, a 2016 U.S. thriller also known as Sorority Nightmare starring Sierra McCormick and Cassidy Gifford
- Twisted Sisters (comic), an underground comic series by Aline Kominsky-Crumb and Diane Noomin
- Twisted Sisters, a term used to refer to a proposed development in the Texpark site in Halifax, Nova Scotia, Canada
- Twisted Sisters, nickname for the late form of the Generation 4 NASCAR vehicles.
- Twisted Sisters (roller coaster), a former name for Twisted Twins, now converted to Wind Chaser.

== See also ==
- Twisted Sister, a heavy-metal band
