= Nova Centre =

Commercial development in Halifax, Canada

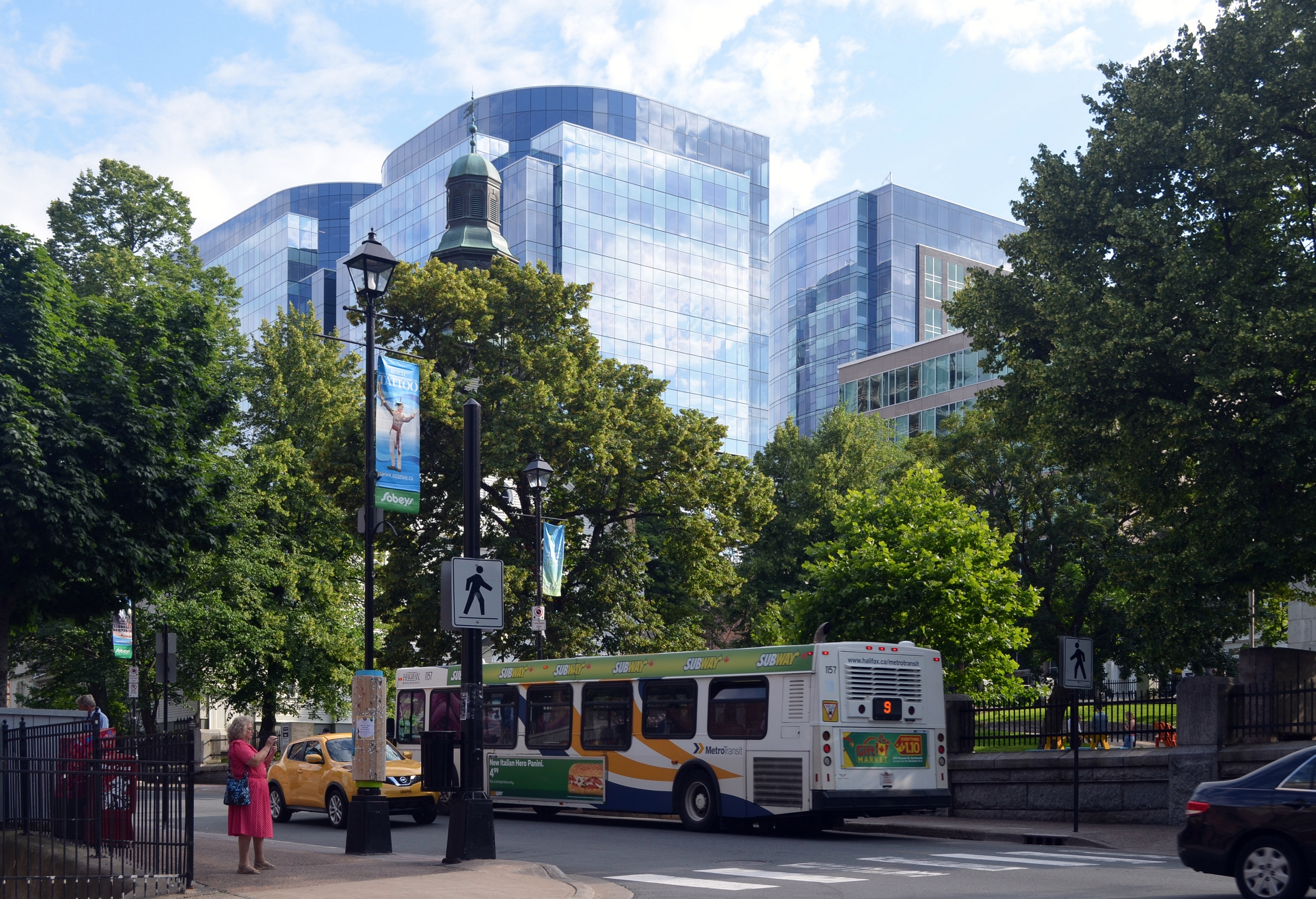
- The complex as seen in July 2017
- Interactive map of the Nova Centre area

General information
- Status: Completed
- Type: Mixed-use
- Architectural style: Contemporary modern
- Location: Halifax, Nova Scotia, Canada
- Coordinates: 44°38′46″N 63°34′29″W
- Construction started: 15 August 2014; 11 years ago
- Topped-out: January 2016; 10 years ago
- Opened: 15 December 2017; 8 years ago
- Cost: C$500 million
- Owner: Joe Ramia
Other information
Height
Roof	North and Hotel Tower: 58 m (190.3 ft); South Tower: 65 m (213.3 ft)
Technical details
Floor count	North and South Tower: 15 floors; Hotel Tower: 16 floors
Floor area	North and South Tower: 14,000 sq ft (1,301 m^{2}) each

Design and construction
- Architect: Noel Fowler Architect
- Architecture firm: Arcadis IBI Group
- Developer: Argyle Developments Inc.
- Engineer: BMR Structural Engineering
- Main contractor: EllisDon Construction, Quadram Construction Company

Website
- novacentre.ca

The Nova Centre is a mixed-use development in Downtown Halifax. It comprises a hotel, two office buildings, the Halifax Convention Centre, commercial space, and Rogers Square, a public pedestrian arcade that was formerly part of Grafton Street. It was developed at a cost of $500 million by Halifax developer Argyle Developments.

== History ==
The Nova Centre complex occupies two city blocks in downtown Halifax. One block was formerly home to the longtime headquarters of the Halifax Chronicle-Herald newspaper.

The project received federal, provincial, and municipal public funding as it would house, in the podium levels and basement, the new Halifax Convention Centre operated by the Crown corporation Trade Centre Limited (TDL).

In 2014, Halifax Regional Council approved the sale of a section of Grafton Street, running through the Nova Centre site, to Argyle Developments at a cost of $1.9 million. This section would remain open to the public as a covered pedestrian arcade, and was rented out for events by the developer.

In October 2015, the Bank of Montreal signed a 10-year lease agreement and naming rights deal to relocate their Atlantic Canadian headquarters to complex. The north tower was alternatively named BMO Tower. The bank's flagship downtown branch is also relocated on the ground level of the building.

In April 2017, it was announced that Grant Thornton had signed a lease for 36,000 square feet (3,300 m^{2}) of space in the complex and would move there from the Cogswell Tower.

== Elements ==
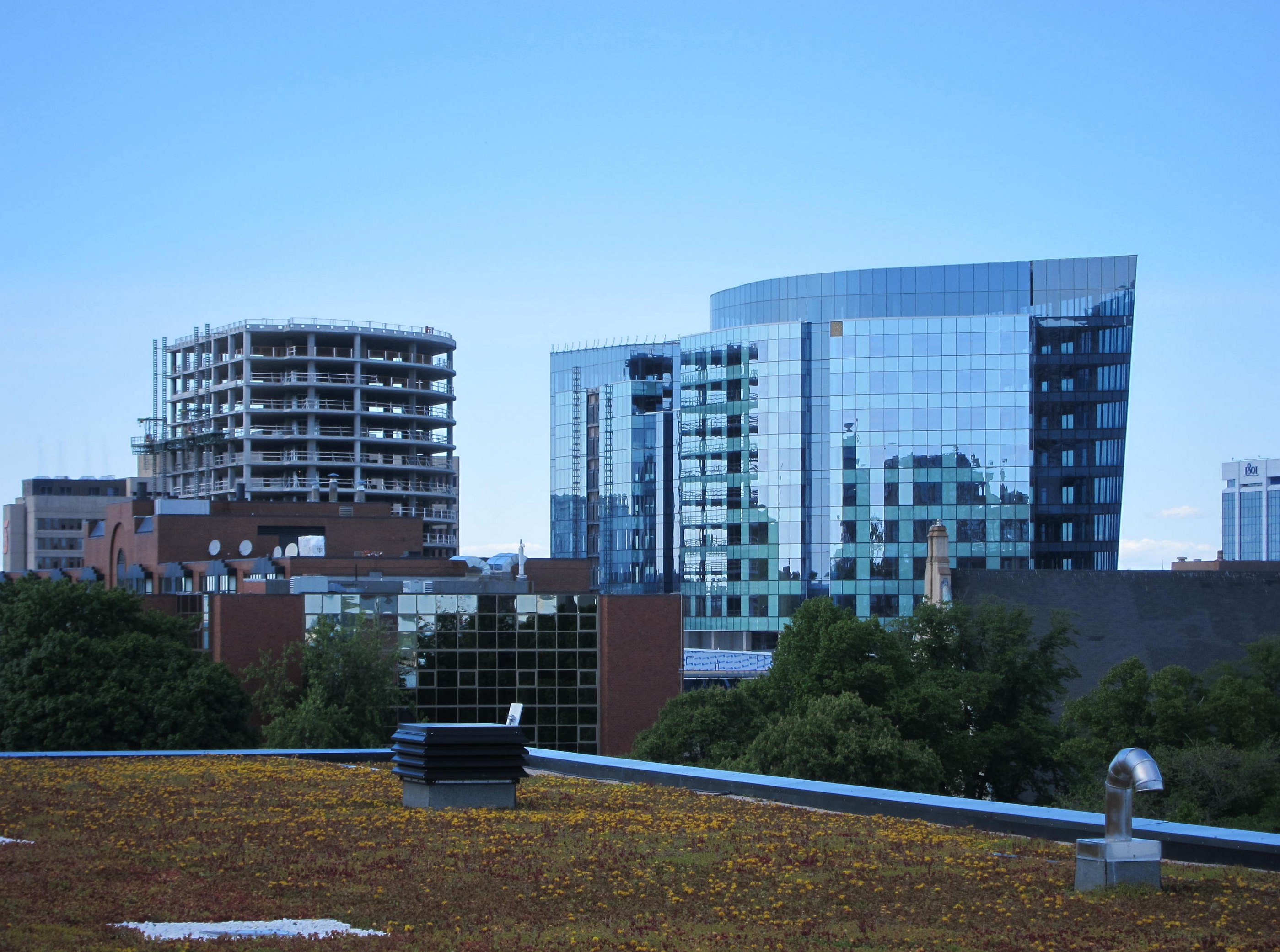
The complex under construction in 2016

=== Office towers ===
The Nova Centre contains two interconnected office towers, the north (also known as the BMO Building) and south tower. Each building offers 14,000 square feet (1,300 m^{2}) of space per floor, or a combined 28,000 square feet (2,600 m^{2}) per floor.

=== Convention centre ===
The Halifax Convention Centre is a conference centre that replaced the nearby World Trade and Convention Centre as the main convention venue in the city. The larger convention facility houses 120,000 square feet (11,000 m^{2}) flexible event space that allows Halifax to accommodate conventions and events that the former convention centre could not handle. The convention centre opened on December 15, 2017.

=== Hotel ===
Sutton Place Hotels partnered with Argyle Developments on the project. Among the contractors for the project was local firm RCS Construction, based in nearby Bedford. The hotel features 262 rooms. Amenities include the Chop Steakhouse & Bar, ceiling-high windows and fitness facilities.

=== Rogers Square ===
The section of Grafton Street purchased by the developer functions as both a pedestrian passageway and as an 18,000-square-foot (1,700 m^{2}) events space. Rogers Communications partnered with Argyle Developments in a multi-year naming rights agreement.
