= Events East =

Canadian event management company

Events East Group
- Company type: Crown corporation
- Industry: Events
- Predecessor: Trade Centre Limited
- Founded: 1 April 2016; 9 years ago in Halifax, Nova Scotia
- Headquarters: Halifax, Nova Scotia, Canada
- Key people: Carrie Cussons (President and CEO)
- Owners: Halifax Regional Municipality; Province of Nova Scotia
- Website: eventseast.com

The Halifax Convention Centre Corporation, doing business as Events East Group, operates two event venues in Halifax, Nova Scotia – the Halifax Convention Centre and the Scotiabank Centre arena – as well as a ticket purchasing system called Ticket Atlantic. Created by provincial legislation that was introduced in 2014, the company is jointly owned by the Halifax municipal government and the province of Nova Scotia.

== History ==
The company was founded by the Halifax Convention Centre Act, which was introduced in preparation for the opening of the new Halifax Convention Centre, intended to replace the World Trade and Convention Centre (WTCC) as Halifax's main conference centre. The act received royal assent on 1 May 2014 and came into force on 1 April 2016. The new legislation allowed employees of Trade Centre Limited (TCL), which operated the WTCC, to be transferred to the Halifax Convention Centre Corporation (operating as Events East). Events East is jointly owned by the province and the Halifax Regional Municipality, while TCL was a provincial Crown corporation. The operating costs of the Halifax Convention Centre are split between the province and city on a 50-50 basis.

The company's first board of directors, appointed by the province and the Halifax Regional Municipality, was announced in June 2016.

On 1 April 2017, Events East Group took over the operations of TCL. TCL employees were also redesignated as Events East employees on this date. Financial accountability of TCL remained with the province of Nova Scotia until 28 February 2018, when it was transferred to the shareholders of the new Halifax Convention Centre Corporation (i.e. the Halifax Regional Municipality and the province of Nova Scotia). On 1 March 2019, the assets and liabilities of Ticket Atlantic were transferred from TCL to Events East, and TCL was disestablished later that month.

Amendments to the Halifax Convention Centre Act were introduced in 2018, one of which confirmed that the corporation would carry on business under the name "Events East Group". The amendments also gave the corporation more operational autonomy.

Scott Ferguson, the former head of Trade Centre Limited, was president and CEO of Events East upon the agency's inception. He was succeeded by Carrie Cussons upon his retirement in 2016. In early 2026, it was announced that Suzanne Fougere, a vice president at Events East, would replace Cussons on 1 April 2026.

== Business areas ==
The company operates the Halifax Convention Centre, which is jointly owned by the Halifax Regional Municipality and the provincial government.

Like its predecessor TCL, it also runs the Scotiabank Centre, which is owned by the Halifax Regional Municipality.

Since 2019, it has operated Ticket Atlantic, a business unit that was transferred from TCL.
