= Granville Mall, Halifax =

Pedestrian mall in Halifax, Canada

Coordinates: 44°38′59.15″N 63°34′29.16″W

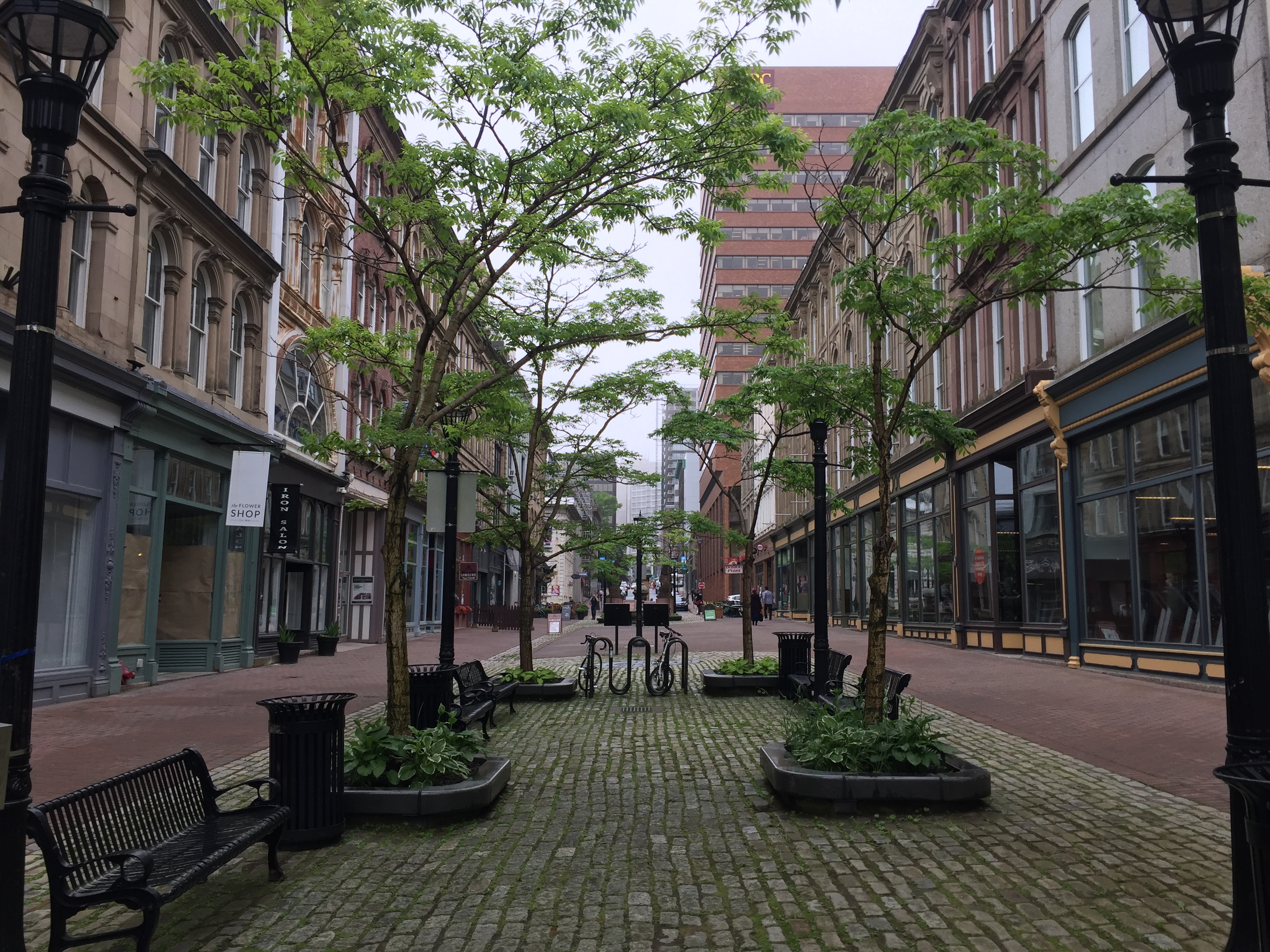
Looking south

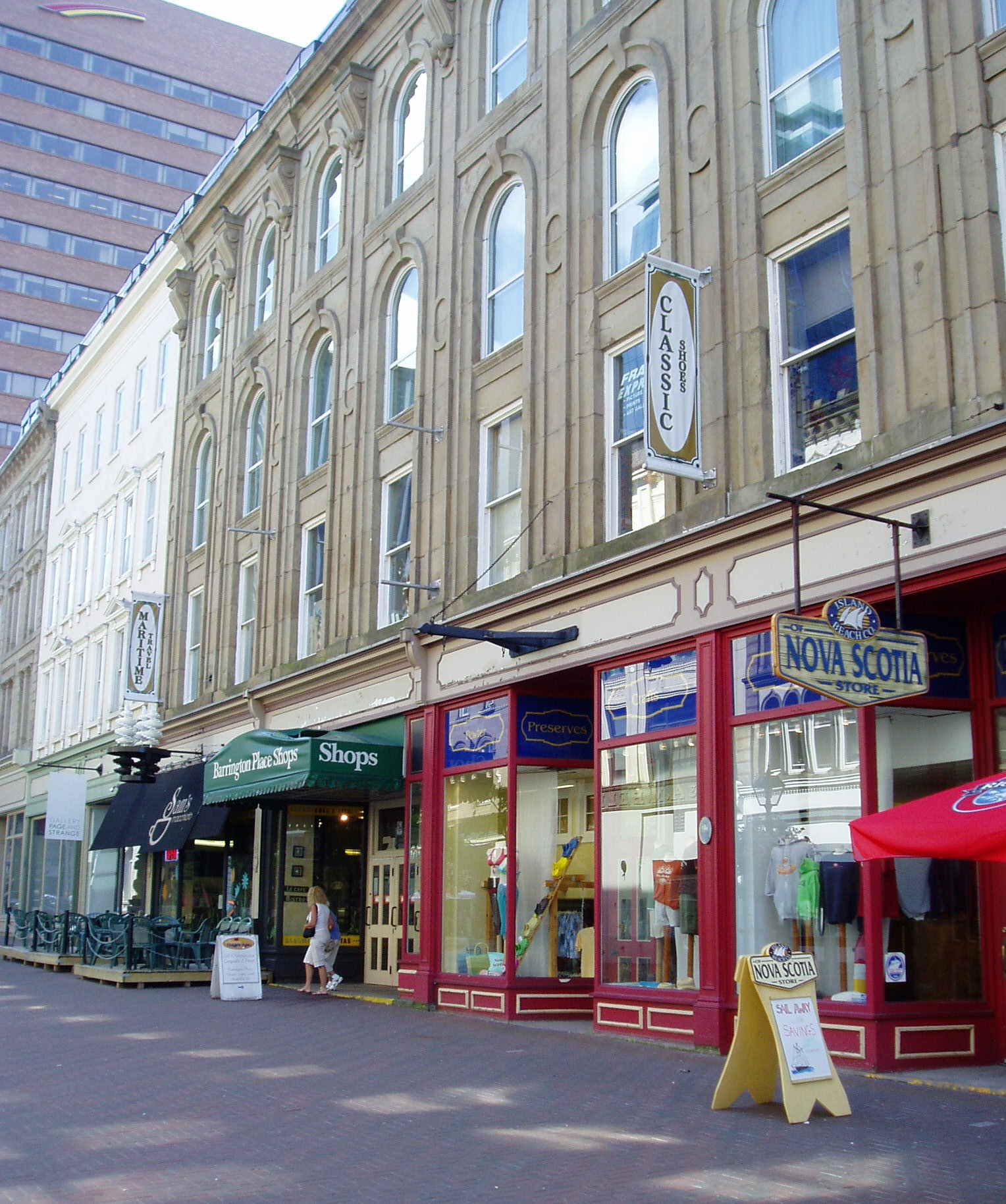
A part of the Granville Mall

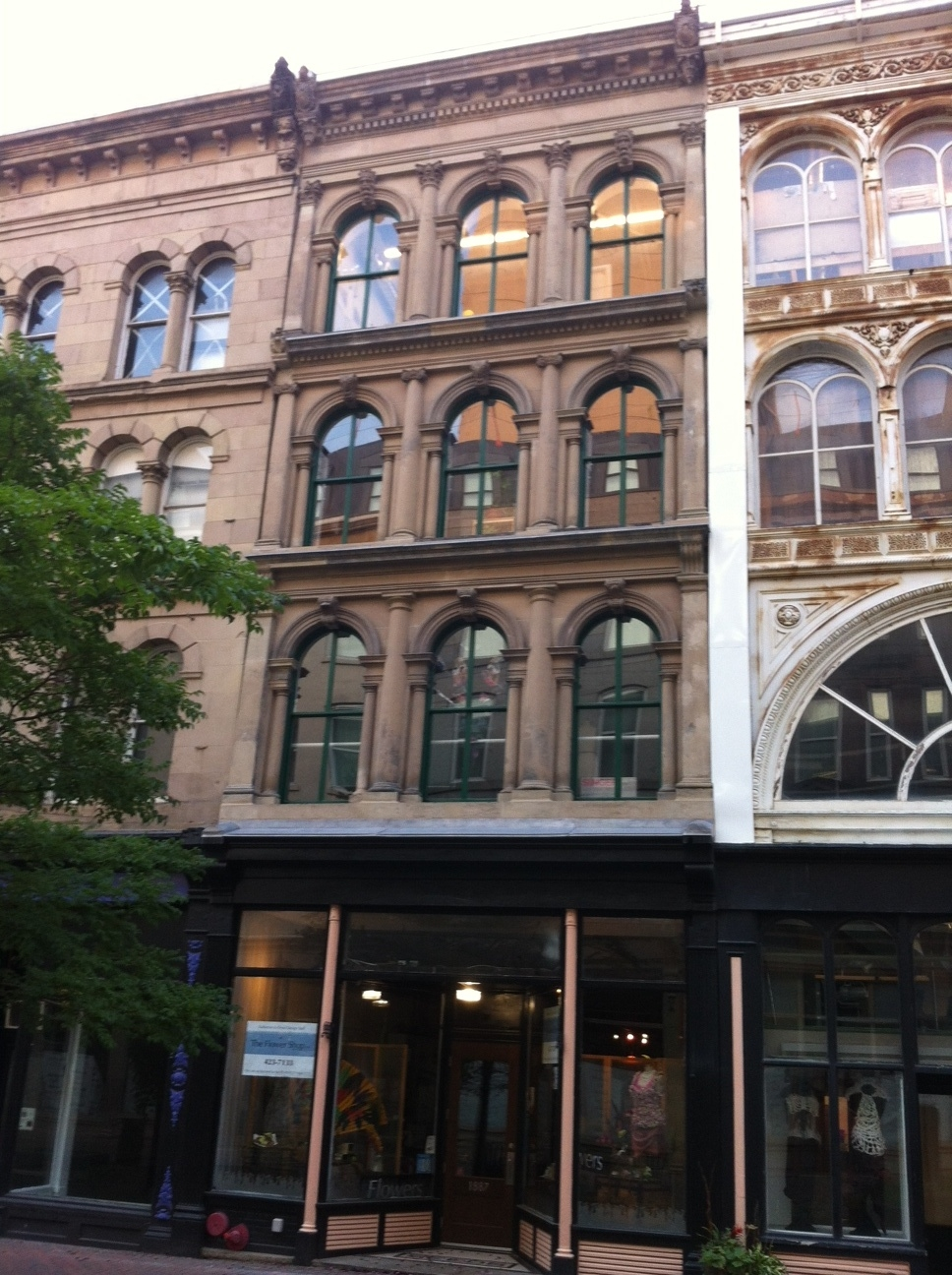
Building by George Lang, Granville Mall

Granville Mall is a pedestrian mall located in downtown Halifax, Nova Scotia, Canada. It was formerly part of Granville Street, until nearby developments, such as the Cogswell Interchange, and Scotia Square, rendered this section traffic-wise and it was converted into a pedestrian mall. The buildings lining the street house a large variety of pubs and stores, and also part of the Nova Scotia College of Art and Design. The nearby Halifax Harbour contributed significantly to the thriving trade activity along the street.

== History ==
=== Early development ===
Granville Street was originally a residential area with wooden houses and garden lots. However, it gradually transformed into a commercial centre in the mid-19th century. This shift was helped by infrastructure improvements such as the railway line to Windsor and the Canadian-American Reciprocity Treaty of 1854, reducing tariffs on my goods and increased trade through Halifax Harbour.

=== Fire and reconstruction ===
On 9 September 1859, 60 buildings in downtown Halifax, including all wooden shops in the north of Granville Street, were destroyed by a fire. This event led to the reconstruction of the mall by the Toronto architectural firm of William Thomas & Sons. The firm designed a unified streetscape with cast iron store fronts, Italianate detailing, and forms that would soon dominate prime Halifax building. These buildings were constructed using stone and brick, which became the standard materials for new construction in the city.
