= Halifax Convention Centre =

Event centre in Halifax, Canada

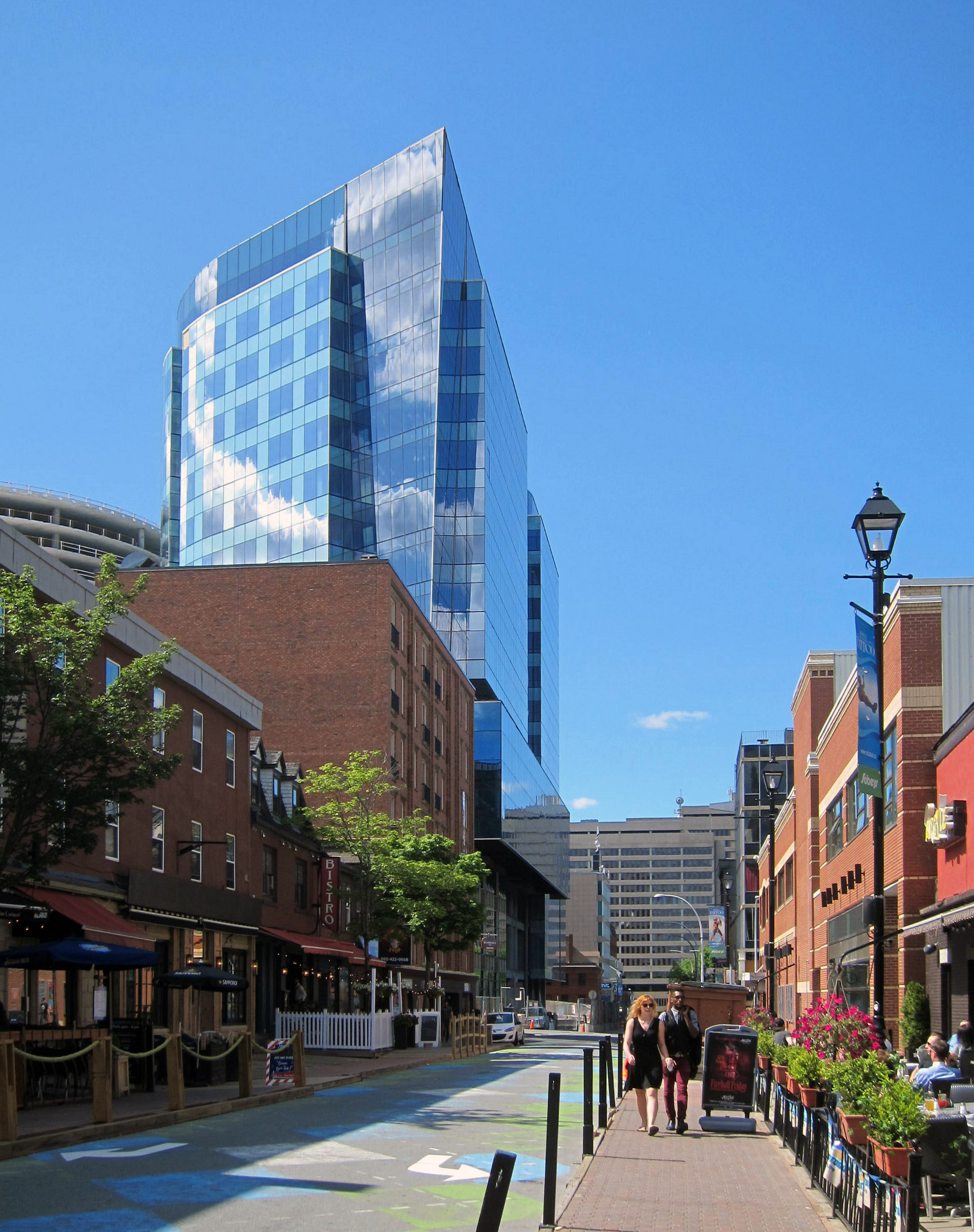
- Nova Centre under construction in 2016
- Interactive map of Halifax Convention Centre
- Address: 1650 Argyle Street
- Location: Halifax, Nova Scotia
- Coordinates: 44.6466°N 63.5749°W
- Owner: Joe Ramia
- Operator: Events East Group
- Public transit: Halifax Transit

Construction
- Built: 15 August 2014; 11 years ago
- Opened: 15 December 2017; 8 years ago
- Construction cost: C$500 million

Website
- halifaxconventioncentre.com

The Halifax Convention Centre is the main conference centre in Halifax, Nova Scotia, Canada. It opened on December 15, 2017 in Downtown Halifax, replacing the older World Trade and Convention Centre.

The Halifax Convention Centre is part of the $500-million Nova Centre project. With 1 million square feet (93,000 m^{2}) of mixed-use space, Nova Centre is the largest integrated development project undertaken in Nova Scotia’s history.

== History ==
=== Background ===
Trade Centre Limited (TCL), the provincial Crown corporation that operated the World Trade and Convention Centre, advocated replacing the facility to accommodate demand for larger scale conventions, citing the lack of a dedicated exhibition room and the larger size of comparable facilities elsewhere in the country. In 2008, Trade Centre Limited and the provincial Department of Transportation and Infrastructure Renewal issued an expression of interest for an expanded facility. This process identified a successful proponent, Rank Inc., a private developer. It was announced that Rank Inc. would build the overall development, called Nova Centre, in which the convention centre would be located.

In August 2011, the federal government announced it would invest $51 million toward eligible construction costs for the new convention centre. The remaining funding was shared by the Province of Nova Scotia and the Halifax Regional Municipality, with each contributing $56.4 million. With funds in place for the convention centre portion of the project, the developer, Rank Inc., continued to work on preliminary designs and securing tenants for the other aspects of the Nova Centre project. In July 2012, Rank Inc. CEO Joe Ramia officially announced his intention to proceed with the project, beginning with wide-ranging public consultation to help inform the look and feel, streetscape and public spaces for the Nova Centre. That same month Regional Council gave its final approval to a Memorandum of Agreement (MOA) with the Province of Nova Scotia that outlines the construction, operational and financial agreements surrounding the new convention centre.

Auditor General Jacques Lapointe, in 2012, criticized the market study used to justify construction of the new convention centre. Without questioning the general merits of a new facility, he stated that "some industry realities were ignored" and provided new calculations which suggested that the economic spinoff could be significantly diminished if the expected utilization rate was lower than calculated. Trade Centre CEO Scott Ferguson responded by stating that he stood by the original projections.

The branding and name of the facility, Halifax Convention Centre, were announced in early 2014 by Ferguson, who praised the "simplicity" and marketing sense of the name and graphic identity.

=== Development ===
In November 2014, the developer confirmed a substantial completion date of September 30, 2016, for the Nova Centre, with an official opening for the Halifax Convention Centre planned for January 2017.

In April 2014, the province introduced the Halifax Convention Centre Act, legislation that will see the provincial government and the Halifax Regional Municipality establish the Halifax Convention Centre Corporation to manage and operate the new facility. The legislation requires the two levels of government to jointly appoint a board of directors. Once in place, the board will set and implement the strategic direction for the corporation.

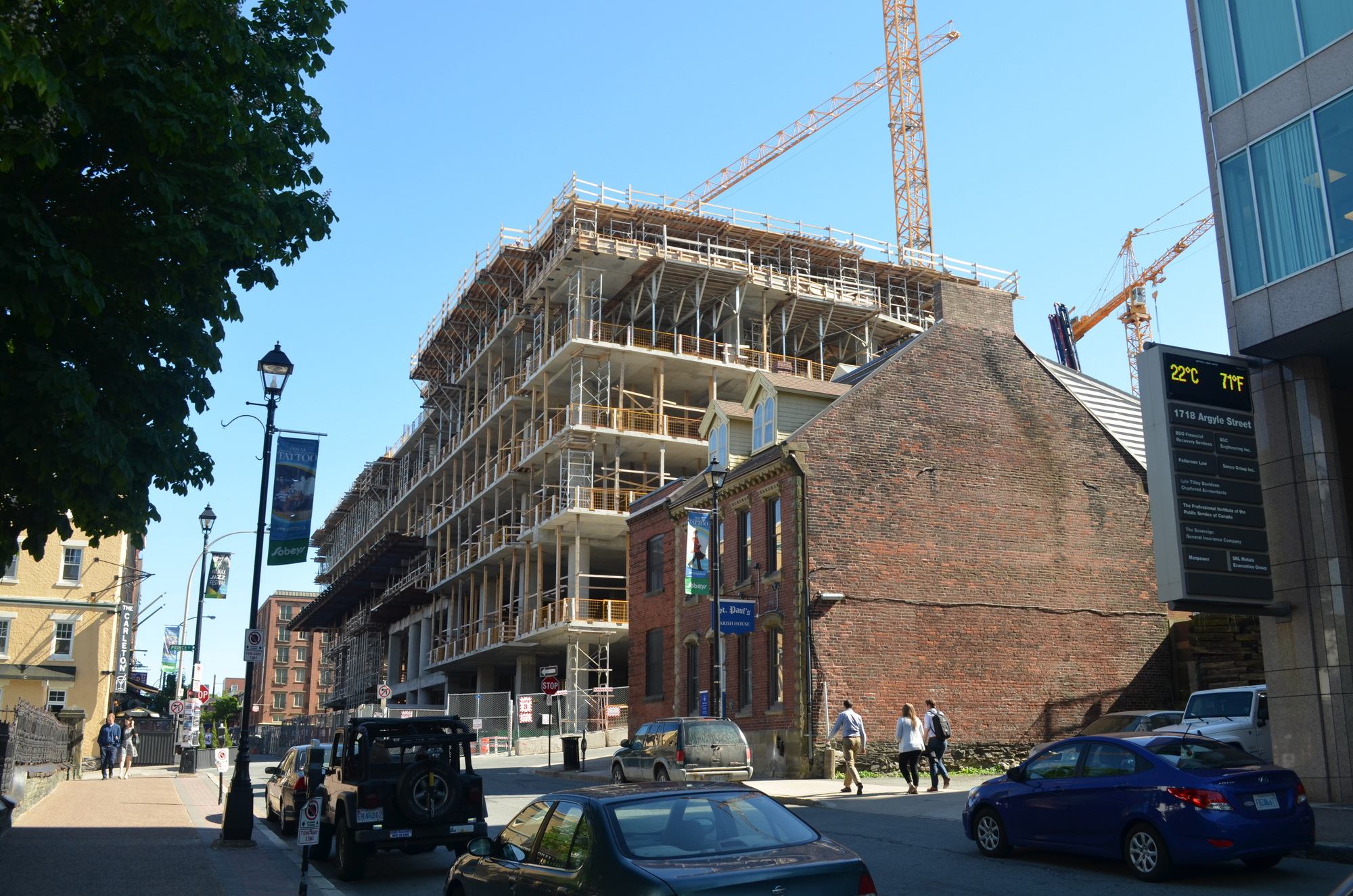
Convention centre under construction in 2015

The developer updated information in its planning application to amend the Downtown Halifax Secondary Municipal Planning Strategy and Land Use By-law and its request to close and acquire Grafton Street. This proposal went before the Design Review Committee on March 20 and was subsequently approved and recommended to Regional Council on April 1, 2014.

A public hearing was held April 29, 2014, to discuss the proposed amendments and to consider the closure of Grafton Street to accommodate the new design of the Nova Centre, specifically bringing the ballroom of the Halifax Convention Centre above ground. This new design arises from public feedback gathered during the consultations in 2012. In the end, Council approved the amendments and asked municipal staff to look into options for the closure of Grafton Street.

The developer presented the final design of the building to the Design Review Committee through a substantive site plan approval application. The Committee approved the application, with conditions, at a special meeting on June 12, 2014. On June 10, 2014, Council discussed the sale of Grafton Street and subsequently approved the sale to Argyle Developments at a price of $1.9 million. The sale closed on August 14.

== Facility ==
The new convention centre comprises over 120,000 square feet (11,000 m^{2}) of meeting space, including a 30,000 square feet (2,800 m^{2}) ballroom, 50,000 square feet (4,600 m^{2}) of multi-purpose convention space, and 40,000 square feet (3,700 m^{2}) of meeting space. It was constructed on a site comprising two city blocks bounded by Prince, Argyle, Sackville, and Market streets, bisected by Grafton Street which has been temporarily closed and destroyed to permit excavation and construction. One of the two blocks was previously the longstanding head office of The Chronicle Herald, who relocated to Armdale.

The convention centre is part of a larger development called Nova Centre, composed of the convention centre podium with office and hotel space above. The entire development has been stated to be about 1 million square feet (93,000 m^{2}) in total.

== See also ==
- Argyle Street (Halifax)
