= Park Lane (mall) =

Shopping mall in Halifax, Nova Scotia, Canada

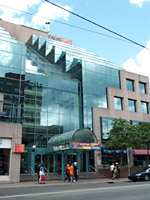
- Spring Garden Road entrance
- Coordinates: 44°38′33.95″N 63°34′41.91″W
- Address: 5657 Spring Garden Road; Halifax, Nova Scotia; B3J 3R4
- Opened: 1988
- Owner: Universal Properties
- Num. of stores: 40+
- Floor area: 120,463 square feet (11,191.4 m^{2})
- Floors: 3
- Parking: 440
- Public transit: Halifax Transit (routes 1, 8, 9+, 10, 14, 123, 185)
- Website: www.shopparklane.ca

Park Lane is a three-storey shopping mall with 40+ shops in Halifax, Nova Scotia, Canada. It is located on Spring Garden Road and is owned by Universal Properties.

== Overview ==
Park Lane is located on Spring Garden Road in Halifax. Parking is available at a parking garage attached to the shopping centre. Park Lane was built in 1988, and opened that same year. A 1999 paper in the Canadian Journal of Urban Research called it the "premier fashion mall" in the city.

The mall is located underneath a seven-storey office tower called Park Lane Terraces, which comprises 109,856 square feet (10,206.0 m^{2}) of office space arranged around an atrium looking down into the shopping centre.

== History ==
The plan in 1986 was for a $50-million building to be available by mid-1988, including office, retail and parking space, with Famous Players as a central tenant for six of twelve proposed cinemas. Robert McAlpine Ltd was contracted for the construction. The initial investors were Halifax Developments Ltd and Atlantic Shopping Centres Ltd, which as of 1991 remained co-owners of the mall. The two companies subsequently merged, and later became Crombie REIT, who put the mall up for sale in 2014.

The Famous Players cineplex, the original anchor tenant at Park Lane, was called the "most ambitious multiple screen venue" in Halifax by Cinema Canada, and it more than doubled the number of screens in the city. It was purchased by Empire Theatres in 2004 and renovated. Empire was subsequently sold to the Cineplex Entertainment chain, and the cineplex was accordingly rebranded once again.

The northern part of the mall originally comprised an eight-storey structure (a parking garage atop the retail levels) designed to accommodate the construction of a second tower on top at a later date. An 11-storey residential tower, called the Martello, was constructed at a cost of $22 million on top of the car park and opened in 2005.

In June 2018, Park Lane was sold by Crombie REIT to Halifax-based Universal Realty Group.

Some scenes from season 4 of The Sinner were filmed here.
