= Trade Centre Limited =

Former Nova Scotia Crown corporation

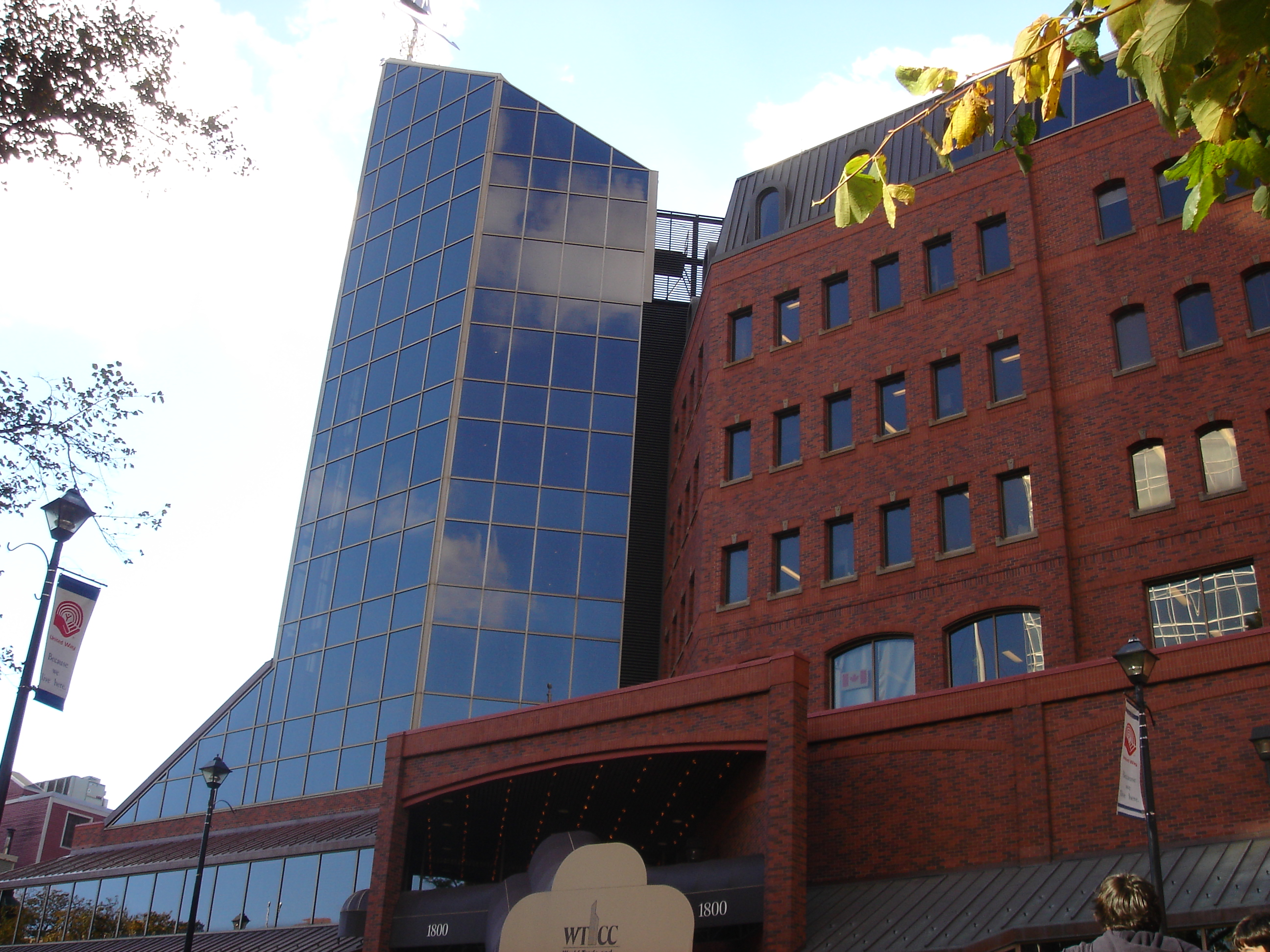
- World Trade and Convention Centre in Halifax
- Company type: Crown corporation
- Industry: Conventions, trade shows, events, real estate
- Founded: 17 November 1981; 43 years ago in Halifax, Nova Scotia
- Defunct: 31 March 2019
- Fate: Wound up
- Successor: Events East Group
- Headquarters: Halifax, Nova Scotia, Canada
- Owner: Province of Nova Scotia
- Website: tradecentrelimited.com (defunct)

Trade Centre Limited (TCL) was a Crown corporation of the Government of Nova Scotia, Canada. Its stated mission was to "create economic and community benefits by bringing people together in Halifax and Nova Scotia". It operated the largest convention and events facilities in the Halifax Regional Municipality, and was a member of the World Trade Centers Association.

== History ==
Trade Centre Limited was created by an Order in Council on 17 November 1981 to own and operate the new World Trade and Convention Centre (WTCC), championed by then-Premier John Buchanan who envisaged the new facility as a scaled-down version of the famous World Trade Center in New York City.

The trade centre would be built next to the Halifax Metro Centre (now Scotiabank Centre), which had opened in 1978. As the two facilities were to be physically connected and operated a whole, an agreement was signed in 1982 transferring management of the Metro Centre to TCL, although the city retained ownership of the arena. TCL took over operations and management of the Metro Centre on 14 May 1982.

In November 1999, the provincial government transferred management of Exhibition Park (now known as the Halifax Exhibition Centre) to TCL. On 1 April 2001, TCL took over responsibility for the Maritime Fall Fair Association (MFFA), a non-profit society formed in December 1999 to host an annual agricultural fair at Exhibition Park.

As of 2015, the corporation employed approximately 100 full-time and 400 part-time staff. TCL was heavily involved in planning and marketing for the new Halifax Convention Centre. On 23 April 2014, the province introduced the Halifax Convention Centre Act, legislation that saw the provincial government and the Halifax Regional Municipality jointly establish the Halifax Convention Centre Corporation to manage and operate the new facility. The new legislation allowed Trade Centre Ltd. employees to be transferred to the Halifax Convention Centre Corporation (which operates as Events East Group).

On 1 April 2017, Events East Group took over the operations of Trade Centre Limited. Trade Centre Limited employees were also redesignated as Events East employees on this date. A limited board was appointed to oversee the winding-down of the corporation. Financial accountability of the organisation remained with the Province of Nova Scotia until 28 February 2018, when it was transferred to the shareholders of the new Halifax Convention Centre Corporation (i.e. the Halifax Regional Municipality and the Province of Nova Scotia). The World Trade and Convention Centre building was sold to Armco Capital, a Halifax developer, on 9 April 2018. On 1 March 2019, the assets and liabilities of Ticket Atlantic were transferred from TCL to Events East. On 31 March 2019, the corporation was formally wound up.

== Business areas ==
- Events Halifax
- Exhibition Park
- Scotiabank Centre – arena, operated by TCL on behalf of HRM
- Ticket Atlantic
- World Trade Centre Atlantic Canada – regional arm of World Trade Centers Association
- World Trade and Convention Centre – convention centre, office tower
