= Texpark site =

Vacant lot in Halifax, Canada

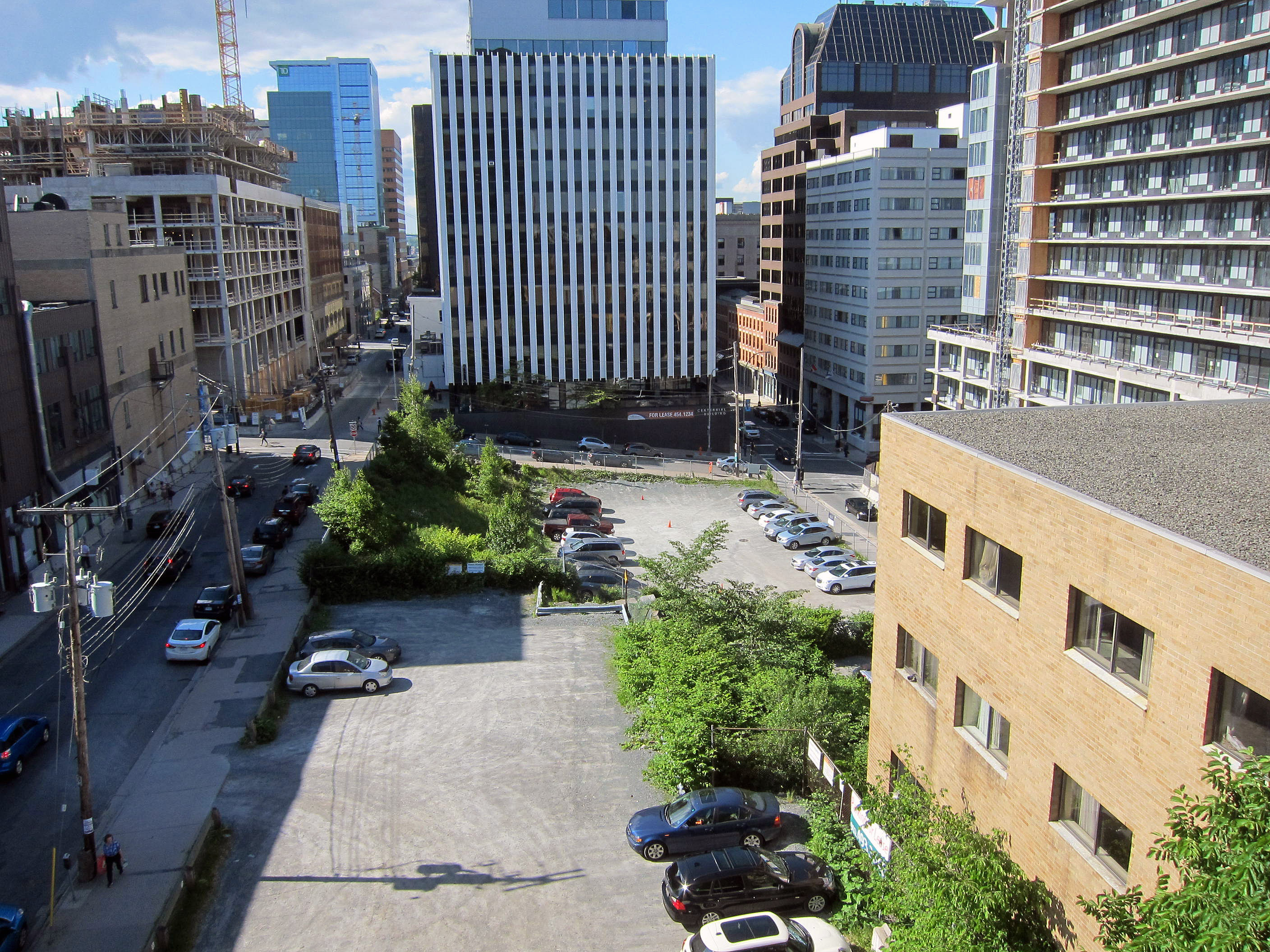
- Texpark site in 2016

- Location within Nova Scotia

General information
- Type: Derelict lot
- Location: Halifax, Nova Scotia, Canada
- Coordinates: 44°38′47″N 63°34′21″W
- Opened: 2004 when Texpark was demolished
- Owner: United Gulf Developments

Technical details
- Material: Gravel

The Texpark site is a prominent vacant lot in Downtown Halifax, Nova Scotia. The Coast, a weekly newspaper, has called it "downtown's biggest gaping hole" and an "embarrassing missing tooth" in the urban fabric. Much of the site was once home to the Texpark, a city-owned parking garage, demolished in 2004.

The lot was sold to United Gulf Developments, who have formally put forward three development proposals for the site. Two of the proposals were approved by the city, but as of 2020 no construction has ever taken place.

== Definition ==
The site is bounded by Granville Street, Sackville Street, and Hollis Street – to the west, north, and east respectively – and by the MetroPark facility to the south. The demolished Tex-Park garage actually only occupied the northern half of what is commonly termed the "Texpark site". The southern half is mainly vacant, but also houses a five-storey office building at 1568 Hollis Street, built in 1960, which still has commercial tenants and is also owned by United Gulf Developments. Ownership of the Texpark site was transferred to 3104854 Nova Scotia Ltd., a numbered company controlled by United Gulf.

== Background ==
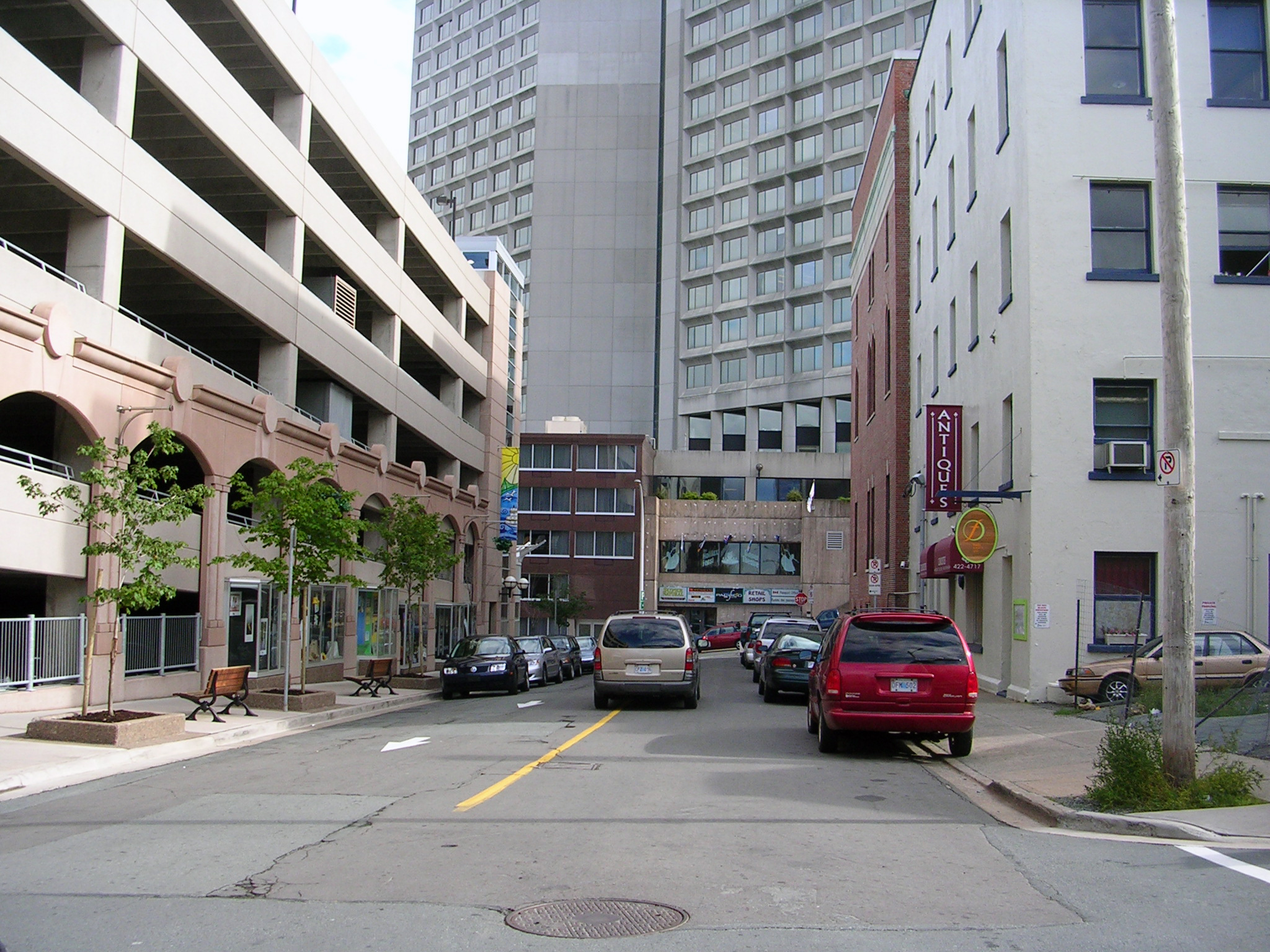
The MetroPark (left) opened in 2002 to replace the Texpark

The lot was once home to the Texpark, a six-storey municipal parking structure built in the early 1960s. It was proposed by the Downtown Business and Professional Men's Association in 1960, at a time when the city was expanding outward in a car-oriented manner and the downtown was in decline. The view of the association was that a multi-storey parking structure would revitalise the downtown area. It hired an architect to draw up preliminary plans for a garage and selected the site themselves, which was occupied by smaller, older structures housing residences and businesses. The business association urged city council to expropriate these inhabitants. The request was well received by the Committee on Works and the planning director.

Council agreed to proceed with a scaled-down version of the proposal and expropriated eight properties from private owners in order to clear the land. Displaced residents received priority upon application to the Housing Authority, and many were resettled at Mulgrave Park, a new public housing estate in the far North End. Expropriation was completed on 16 August 1960.

The garage was leased out to Texaco Canada on a long-term basis and had a service station on the ground floor as well as a convenience store. The lease was reassigned to Ultramar when that company purchased assets of Texaco Canada in 1990.

The garage was in decrepit condition by the turn of the millennium. The city issued a request for proposals for a new downtown parking garage on 6 September 2000, intended to replace the parking spaces at both the Texpark and the Bishop's Landing sites. It received five valid submissions and a proposal by the Hardman Group was approved by Regional Council on 12 December 2000. Construction of the replacement garage, which sits at the opposite end of the same city block as the Texpark site, began in April 2001. Called MetroPark, it opened on 1 April 2002.

The Texpark was demolished in late 2004 by the city. The vacant lot was sold to United Gulf Developments the same year.

== Development proposals ==
=== Tender proposal ===
When United Gulf originally bid for the site on 30 April 2004, they proposed a single 26-storey tower with retail space on the ground floor and an unspecified arrangement of hotel and residential space above. However, this was not proposed under a formal development approvals process. The sale would be for a vacant lot on an as-is basis, with no development permit guarantees – meaning the winning bidder would still need to acquire a Development Agreement for any development over 40 feet tall. The height cap for as-of-right development on the site was later revised to 24 storeys under the HRM by Design form-based code.

=== Twisted Sisters ===
United Gulf submitted a formal development application in 2005. Widely termed the Twisted Sisters in local media for its twisting form, the proposal comprised two 27-storey towers (including the height of the common podium) designed by Hariri Pontarini Architects of Toronto. The estimated cost was approximately $150 million. The two towers would house a hotel and condo residences respectively, while the podium would house retail space.

Like other high-rise proposals in Halifax, the towers were controversial among some who believed they would partially obstruct the view of the Halifax Harbour from Citadel Hill. City planning staff noted that the towers would not be visible from inside the Citadel's historic parade square due to the steep slope of the downtown area. During the multi-day public hearing on the project, heritage groups expressed opposition to the scheme on these grounds. Howard Epstein, then-MLA for Halifax Chebucto, stated: "We have already been blessed with icons [...] The things that make Halifax recognizable, geology has given us. We don't need anything replacing the Citadel as our iconic focus." On the other hand, many young people spoke in favour of the development, calling it a sign of progress and a bright economic future in Halifax.

The development was approved by regional council on 7 February 2006. Heritage groups (namely the Heritage Trust of Nova Scotia, the Federation of Nova Scotian Heritage, and the Heritage Canada Foundation) appealed the decision to the Nova Scotia Utility and Review Board (NSUARB), which ruled on 13 September 2007 that the development could proceed. The NSUARB stated that the proposal did not violate the Municipal Planning Strategy and did not impinge on the statutory viewplanes that protect the views from Citadel Hill.

Despite finally gaining approval, United Gulf never proceeded with the Twisted Sisters proposal and the Development Agreement expired in 2010. In June 2011, regional council discussed discharging the Development Agreement, but United Gulf objected due to a misunderstanding over the expiry date and stated that they were preparing a new proposal for the site.

=== Skye Halifax (2012) ===
In 2012, United Gulf proposed a twin tower development for the site called Skye Halifax, the largest and tallest development ever proposed in the city. The proposal comprised two 44-storey towers, atop a four-storey shared podium, designed by Toronto architect Peter Clewes. The complex would house hotel rooms, condos, retail, and dining space and aimed for LEED certification. The estimated cost of construction was $350 million.

The proposal was opposed by the city planning department, the Design Review Committee, former chief urban designer Andy Fillmore, and the Downtown Halifax Business Commission. Mayor Savage stated in council that approving the proposal would undermine council's commitment to HRM by Design, an urban design and development approvals framework, because Skye Halifax greatly exceeded the specified height limit for as-of-right development. On 20 November 2012 the council voted against allowing the proposal to proceed.

In 2013 Navid Saberi, president of United Gulf, said that he would likely make another proposal to City Hall within the following year to 18 months. However, he did not.

The 2006 Twisted Sisters Development Agreement, after expiring in 2010, was left in an "inactive" state. Council had to vote to either expunge or extend it. United Gulf president Navid Saberi stated in May 2016 that his company was "very close" to submitting a new proposal and hoped council would agree to an extension.

In a letter dated 5 May 2016, an architecture firm representing United Gulf requested an extension to the Development Agreement's date of commencement. City staff recommended against this action and further recommended discharging the Development Agreement. Council voted on 20 September 2016 to discharge the Development Agreement.

=== Skye Halifax (2019) ===
United Gulf put forward a new proposal in 2019, also called Skye Halifax. It comprises two 21-storey, 66-metre-tall towers linked by a shared podium. The development would include 25,000 square feet of retail space, 400 residential units, 100 hotel rooms, and indoor car parking. Like the previous proposal, the design was produced by Peter Clewes of architecture firm architectsAlliance. The city's Design Review Committee approved the proposal with conditions in November 2019. At that time, Saberi claimed he planned to begin construction in January 2021.
