= Spring Garden Road, Halifax =

Coordinates: 44°38′33.4″N 63°34′42.4″W

Spring Garden Road
- Community
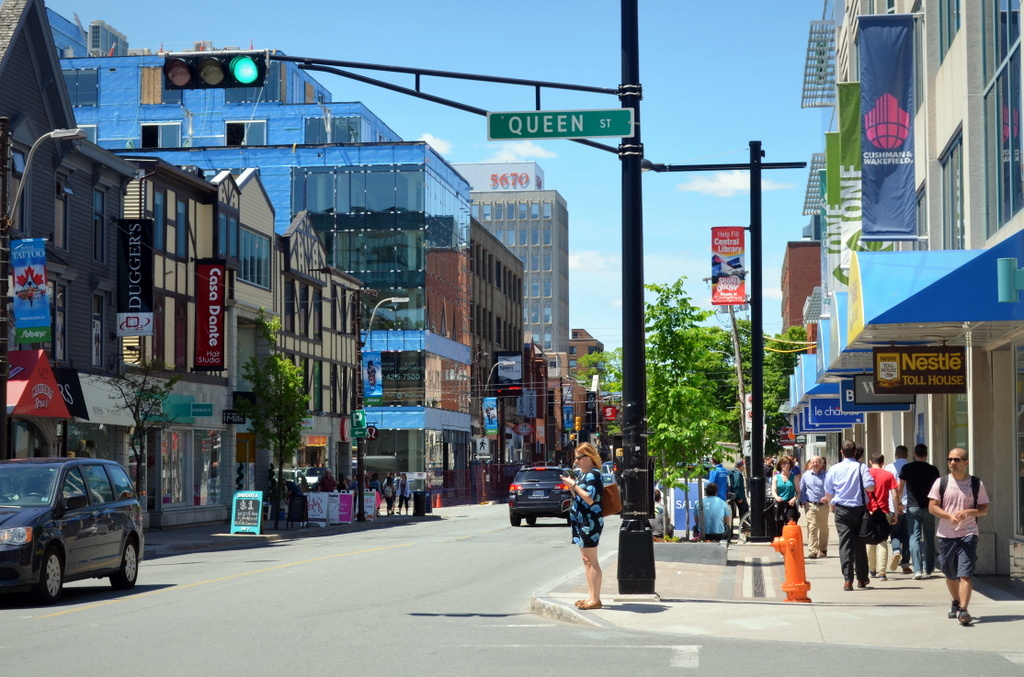
- Spring Garden Road at Queen Street
- Interactive map of Spring Garden Road
- Country: Canada
- Province: Nova Scotia
- Municipality: Halifax Regional Municipality
- Community council: Halifax and West
- Municipal District: Halifax South Downtown

The Spring Garden Road area, along with Barrington Street (which it adjoins) is a major commercial and cultural district in Halifax, Nova Scotia, Canada. It acquired its name from the fresh water spring that flows directly beneath it. It comprises Spring Garden Road, South Park Street, and a number of smaller side streets. The area is considered to be one of the trendiest areas in Halifax and is the busiest shopping district east of Quebec.

Spring Garden Road is home to a number of pubs, coffee shops and boutiques, making it busy both day and night. On Spring Garden one can also find the Main Branch of Halifax Public Libraries, the Halifax Provincial Court, the school of architecture and the Sexton Campus of Dalhousie University (the former Technical University of Nova Scotia), the Halifax Public Gardens, and St. Mary's Basilica. The area is also in proximity to the Citadel and the Scotiabank Centre, and several major hotels are located nearby.

Spring Garden Road runs to Robie Street, where it becomes Coburg Road, a largely residential thoroughfare. It is served by numerous Halifax Transit routes. Routes 1, 4, 8, 9, and 10 provide service from 6:00 am until around midnight daily.

== History ==
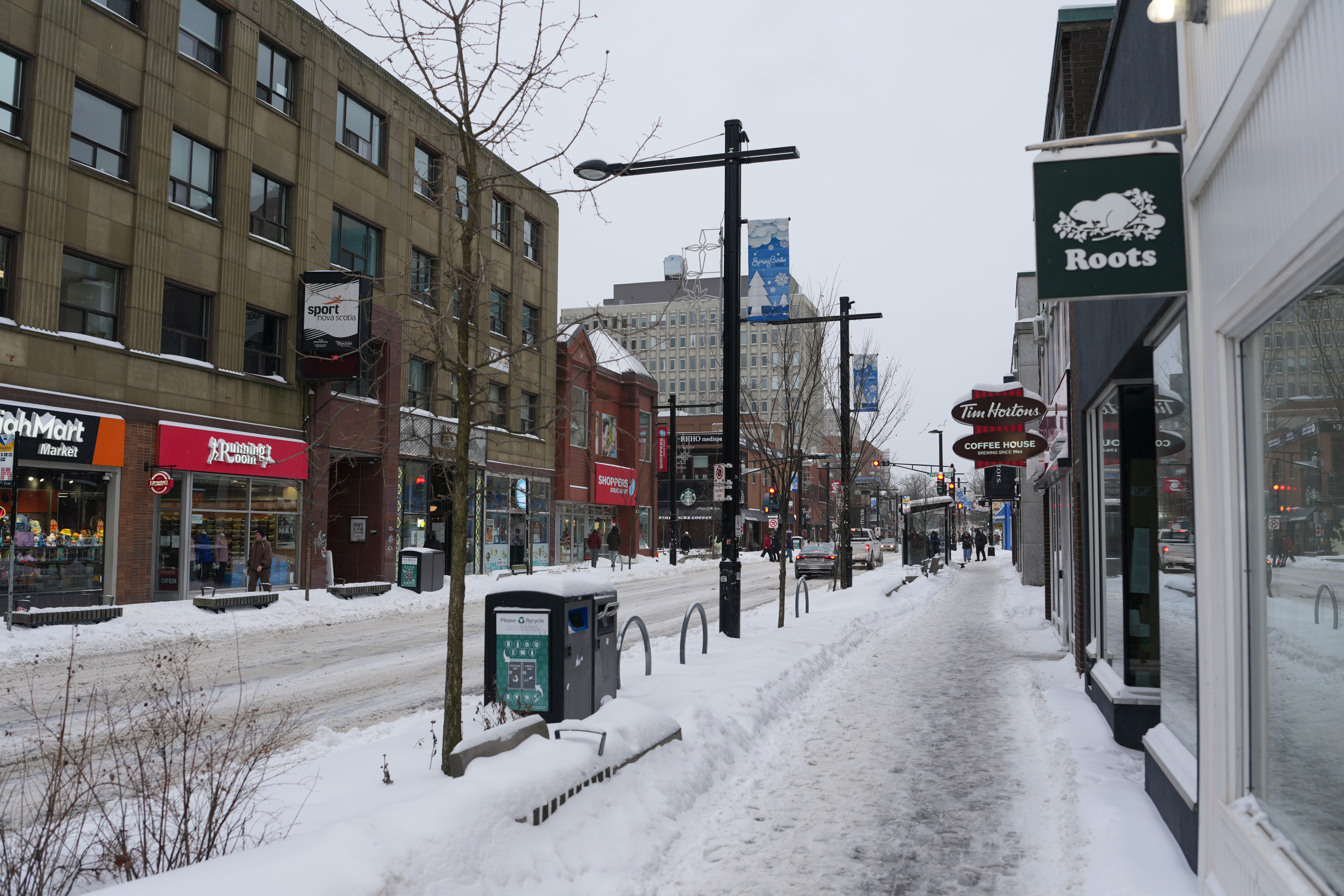
Spring Garden Road on a winter day

Spring Garden Road has been the site of several significant events and has undergone many changes over the centuries, transitioning from a pasture outside the town walls of 18th-century Halifax to a vibrant, mixed-use neighbourhood today.

The seventy-five year period of war between the Mi'kmaq people and the British ended with the Burial of the Hatchet Ceremony. On June 25, 1761, a “Burying of the Hatchet Ceremony” was held at Governor Jonathan Belcher’s garden on present-day Spring Garden Road in front of the Court House. In commemoration of these treaties, Nova Scotians annually celebrate Treaty Day on October 1.

Prince Edward, Prince of Wales arrived in Halifax in July 1860, making this city his first stop on the first tour of North America by an heir to the British throne. Numerous arches were erected around the city to commemorate the occasion. The day after arriving, the Prince's procession traveled from Government House up Spring Garden Road toward the Public Gardens. An arch was erected by the archbishop at the foot of Spring Garden Road emblazoned with the words "Welcome to the Land of the Mayflower" and festooned with wreathes and thousands of roses. Further up the road a large arch, sponsored by General Trollope, Commander-in-Chief of His Majesty's Forces in Nova Scotia, was erected in front of the courthouse. The archway was lauded by the British Colonist newspaper as "the grandest object amongst all our displays, in or around the city, outside of the Province Building.... It is the most splendid thing of the kind we have ever seen, here or elsewhere, and evinces on the part of its designer, not only much taste but real genius." Other arches and monuments were set up outside the gardens and the Convent of the Sacred Heart.

An area in the district, just to the south of Spring Garden Road, is known as Schmidtville. This land was purchased by James Pedley in 1781 and was originally outside the Halifax town walls. As the threat of attack from natives diminished, the land was divided into building lots for new housing and new streets laid out including Birmingham Street, Dresden Row, and Rottenburg Street (now Clyde Street). Part of Schmidtville was demolished in the 1950s and replaced with large surface parking lots. These lots are now being redeveloped into mid-size mixed-use developments. The rest of Schmidtville is home to some of the city's oldest houses.

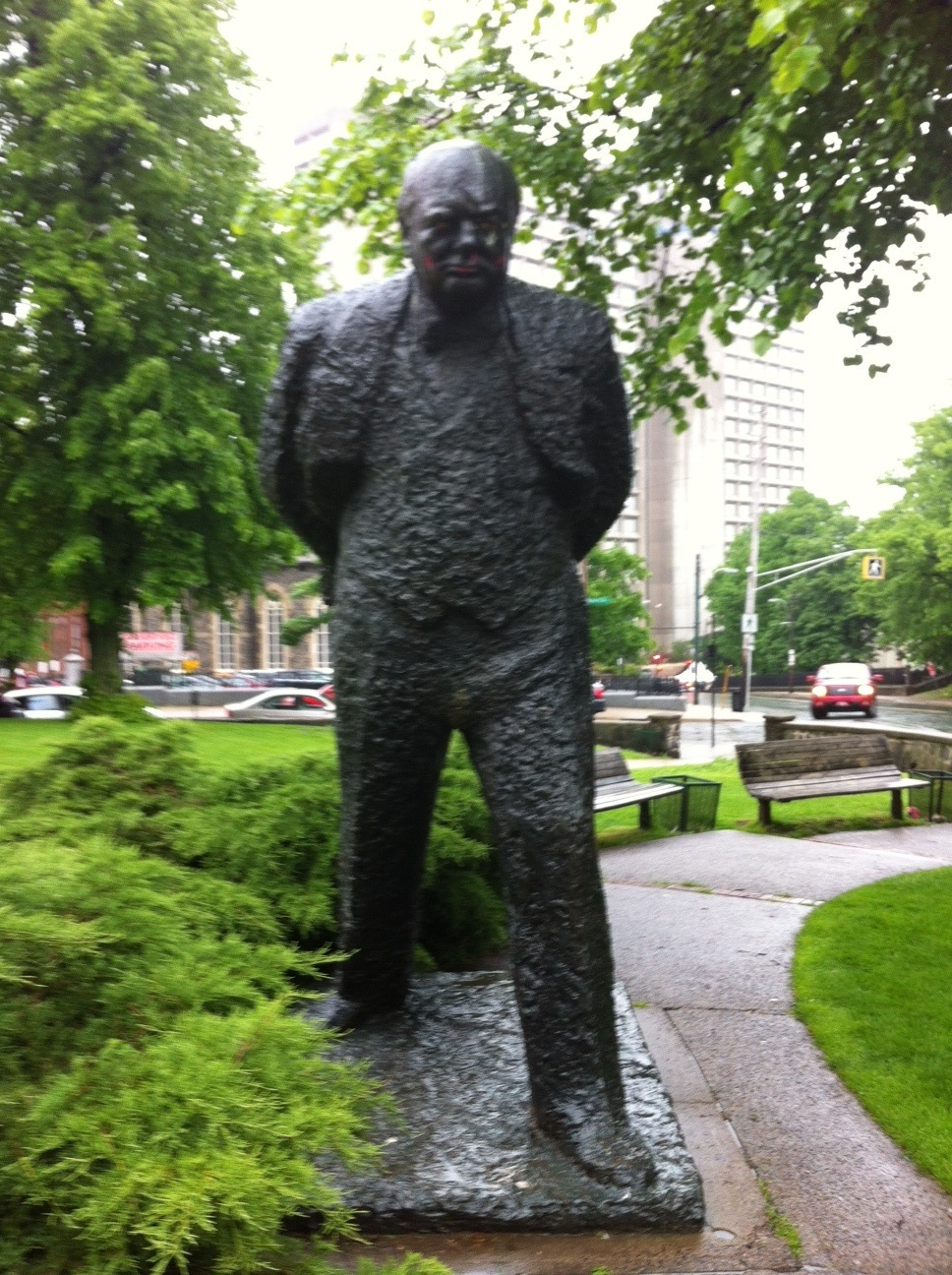
Statue of Winston Churchill outside the Spring Garden Memorial Library

The land on which the Spring Garden Road Memorial Library sits has been known as Grafton Park for two centuries or more. This lot at the corner of Brunswick Street and Spring Garden was used as a burial ground for paupers from the late 1700s to mid-1800s. It was listed as a "public park" in an 1895 insurance map. In the mid-20th century the library was built in Grafton Park, but sited back from the street to preserve a traditional walking path, running diagonally through the property, between Spring Garden and Grafton Street. The library was closed in 2014 and replaced by the Halifax Central Library across the street.

Over the 20th century the city continued to grow outward. Numerous apartment towers were built in the western, less commercial part of Spring Garden Road. Spring Garden Terrace, a 201-unit apartment building, was designed by Ian Martin of Montreal and opened in 1963. Embassy Towers opened in 1967. The high residential population of the district, coupled with its mixed-use nature, makes the neighbourhood one of the most vibrant and economically successful in the city.

Until the mid-20th century, Spring Garden Road was served by a tram line. The street was considered fashionable by the 1970s, home to a number of specialty stores and fine clothing retailers. It continued to grow in stature during the 1980s, and several shopping centres were built. These innovated upon earlier shopping centres on Barrington Street in that they did not turn a blank wall to the street, but instead maintained continuous shop frontage. Park Lane opened in 1988. City Centre Atlantic, a mixed-use development on Spring Garden Road, was developed by Halifax company Ryco Developments Limited in the late 1980s. Spring Garden Place expanded in 1992.

== Gathering places ==
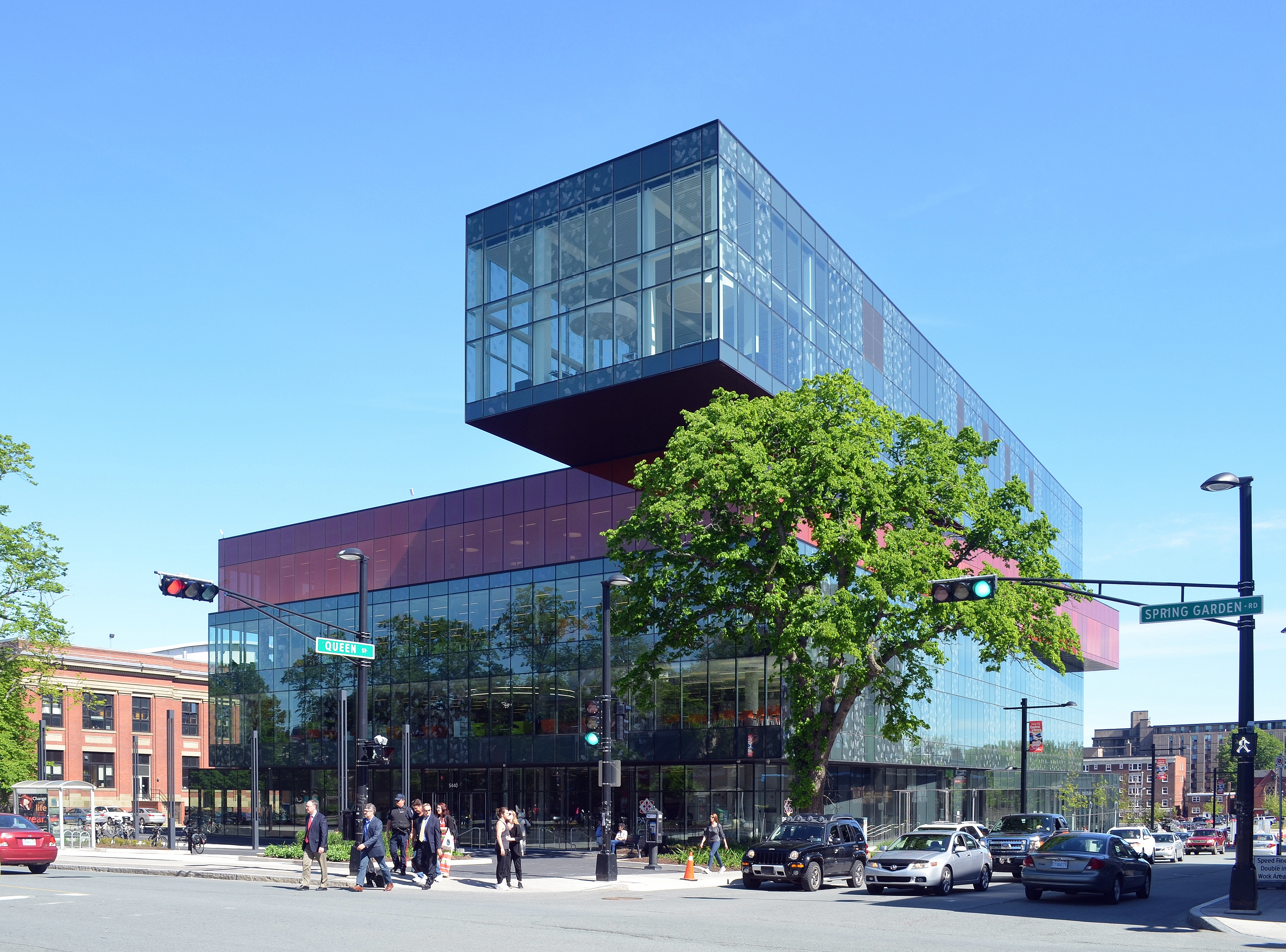
Halifax Central Library

The street sees some of the highest foot traffic in the city, and hosts several popular public gathering places. The Lord Nelson Hotel, at the corner of Spring Garden Road and South Park Street, is a Halifax landmark. During the 1960s its grounds were a popular hang-out for artists and hippies and inspired a novel, Lord Nelson Tavern by Ray Smith, but the wall outside upon which people sat was subsequently redeveloped into shops. The park outside the Spring Garden Memorial Library is a particularly popular place to stop and rest. Citizens can enjoy the buskers and purchase food from several vendors. The low wall around the garden is a very popular place to sit and rest.

Victoria Park, with its memorials to Scottish writers, Walter Scott and Robert Burns, including the square surrounding the Burns statue at the corner of Spring Garden and South Park, is sometimes used for arts events, community gatherings, and demonstrations. In 2011, the site was briefly home to the Occupy Nova Scotia movement, who agreed to relocate there after Mayor Peter J. Kelly requested they vacate the Grand Parade to make way for the annual Remembrance Day ceremonies. Unbeknownst to the protestors, the mayor controversially issued an order to have the site cleared by police on the morning of Remembrance Day, and several protesters were arrested.

The new Halifax Central Library on the corner of Spring Garden Road and Queen Street forms a new locus of activity on a site that had previously been a surface parking lot for over five decades. In 2021 the Halifax Regional Municipality undertook a major upgrade of the Street from South Park to Queen street, widening sidewalks and burying electrical services among other improvements.

== Major intersections ==
- Barrington Street
- Brunswick Street
- Queen Street
- South Park Street
- Cathedral Lane
- Summer Street
- Robie Street

== Notable places ==
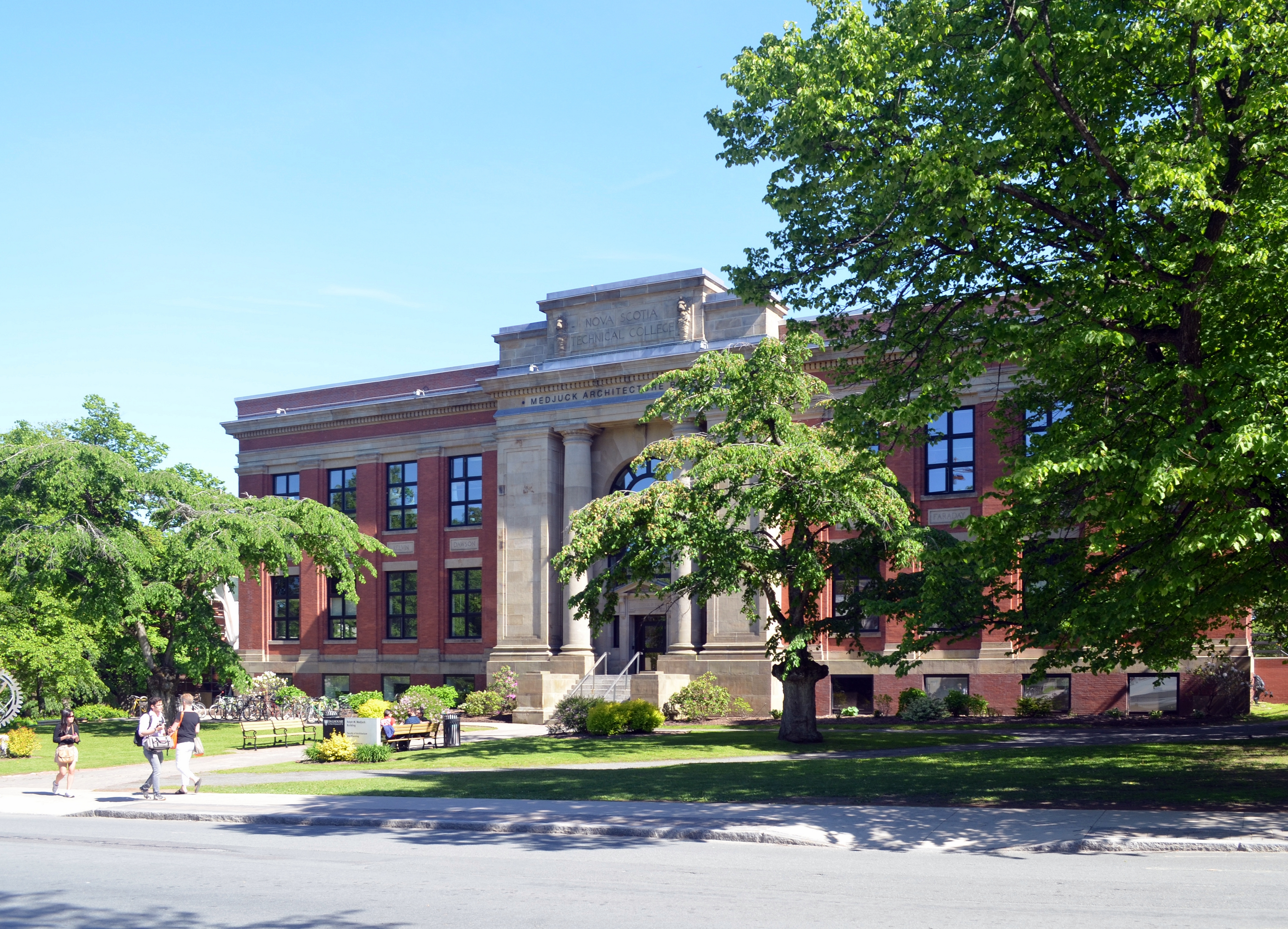
School of Architecture and Planning, Dalhousie University

- Halifax Public Gardens
- Sacred Heart School of Halifax
- Victoria Park
- Lord Nelson Hotel
- Park Lane Mall
- Halifax Central Library
- Dalhousie University School of Architecture and Planning
- Spring Garden Road Memorial Library (closed 2014, awaiting repurposing)
- Provincial Court
- St. Mary's Basilica
- St. Peter's/St. Mary's Cemetery
- Old Burying Ground
- Maritime Centre
