= World Trade and Convention Centre =

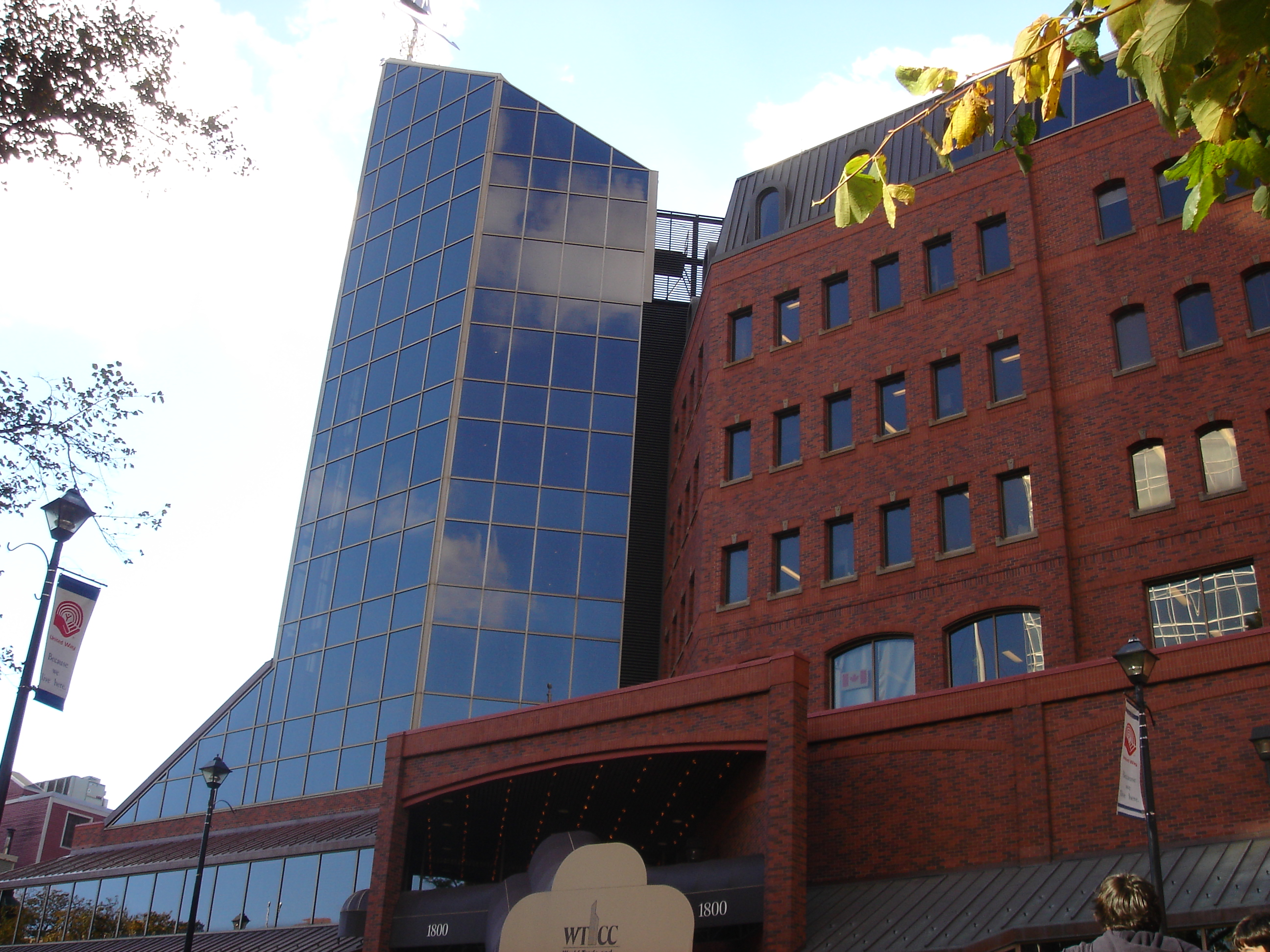
- Interactive map of World Trade and Convention Centre
- Address: 1650 Argyle Street
- Location: Halifax, Nova Scotia,
- Coordinates: 44°38′54″N 63°34′33″W
- Owner: Province of Nova Scotia
- Operator: Trade Centre Limited
- Public transit: 2, 10, 84, 123, 138

Construction
- Built: 1983; 43 years ago
- Opened: 24 February 1985; 41 years ago
- Closed: 17 December 2017; 8 years ago

Website
- wtcchalifax.com (defunct)

The World Trade and Convention Centre (WTCC) was a convention centre and office complex in Halifax, Nova Scotia, Canada, adjacent to the Scotiabank Centre. The facility had 30,000 square feet (2,800 m^{2}) of meeting space and a 20,000-square-foot ballroom. It was replaced by the larger Halifax Convention Centre in 2017, and the building was sold to a private developer.

== History ==
The WTCC was championed by then-Premier John Buchanan who boasted to reporters in 1981 that the new facility would serve as a scaled-down version of the famous World Trade Center in New York City, eventually becoming the economic and business capital of Atlantic Canada. An opening ceremony was held on 24 February 1985, for 1,200 invited guests.

Buchanan stated at the time that the centre would generate revenue in "the near future", but the WTCC and Trade Centre Limited have routinely operated at a deficit over the years.

The convention centre operator has stated that the current facility is insufficiently sized to accommodate demand for larger scale conventions, citing the lack of a dedicated exhibition room and the larger size of comparable facilities elsewhere in the country. In 2008, Trade Centre Limited and the provincial Department of Transportation and Infrastructure Renewal issued an expression of interest for an expanded facility. As a result, TCL is working with a private developer, Rank Inc., to develop a new convention facility.

The Halifax Convention Centre is located within the nearby Nova Centre, which opened in 2017.

In March 2016 the province announced the signing of a 25-year agreement with the developers of the Nova Centre. The WTCC will hence be offered up for sale to private interests for $13.5 million.

The Halifax Regional Municipality declined to purchase the complex from the province. In August 2016, it was announced that the province would sell the building to Halifax developer George Armoyan for $13.5 million.

With funding from the federal, provincial, and city governments, the building is being redeveloped to house a cultural centre with a 1,800-seat performance hall, a cinema, dance studios, media production studios, and office space for non-profit cultural groups. The exterior was to be renovated to house new shops and restaurants, intended to enliven this part of Argyle Street, but developer Armco instead signed a 10-year lease with the federal government. The ground-level commercial spaces will house Service Canada.

== Characteristics ==
The convention centre had 30,000 square feet (2,800 m^{2}) of meeting space and a 20,000 square foot ballroom.

Its connection to the Downtown Halifax Link connected it to over 1,000 four-diamond guest rooms (within the Halifax Marriott Harbourfront Hotel, the Delta Barrington, Prince George Hotel, the Delta Halifax) with an additional 1,400 hotel rooms in the greater city core, and shopping, dining and entertainment options.

The WTCC was the premier conference facility in the region during its years of operation. The facility was run by Trade Centre Limited, a provincial Crown corporation, and owned by the province of Nova Scotia.

The convention centre was home to the Nova Scotia Sport Hall of Fame and was located below an office tower housing several provincial departments and Crown corporations, including Nova Scotia Business Inc.
