= Buildings and structures in Halifax, Nova Scotia =

List of buildings in Halifax, Nova Scotia

The following is a list of buildings in the Halifax Regional Municipality, Nova Scotia with articles on Wikipedia.

Building	Address	Community	Type	Floors	Height	Completed	Notes	References
Halifax Town Clock	Brunswick Street	Halifax	Clock Tower	3		1803	Palladian-style structure was restored 2005	
Lord Nelson Hotel	1515 South Park Street	Halifax	Hotel	9	29.88 m (98.0 ft)	1927-1928	2 floors added in 1967	
Government House (Nova Scotia)	1451 Barrington Street	Halifax	Government	3		1805	Official residence of the Lieutenant Governor of Nova Scotia and example of Adam-Georgian architecture	
St. George's (Round) Church	2222 Brunswick Street	Halifax	Religious	2		1812	National Historic Site of Canada (1983), Nova Scotia Heritage Designation (1999)..	
King's Wharf	50 King's Wharf Plaza	Dartmouth	Residential	33	120 m (390 ft)	2015	Proposed building	
Tupper Building	5850 College Street	Halifax	University Residential	16		1967		
The Martello	1550 Dresden Row	Halifax	Residential	16		2005		
Centennial Building, Halifax	1660 Hollis Street	Halifax	Office Building	13		1967		
Joseph Howe Building	1690 Hollis Street	Halifax	Office Building	13		1974	Home to Department of Health, Speaker's Office, Human Rights Commission, Voluntary Planning, Security Commission and Intergovernmental Affairs. Building being sold by Government of Nova Scotia.	
Radisson Suite Hotel Halifax	1649 Hollis Street	Halifax	Hotel	10		1996		
Bank of Nova Scotia Building	1709 Hollis Street	Halifax	Office Building	6		1931		
Halifax World Trade Centre	1800 Argyle Street	Halifax	Convention Centre and Hotel	18 (hotel); 14 (office building)			Proposed complex to be built on site of former Halifax Herald Building	
Westin Nova Scotian	1181 Hollis Street	Halifax	Hotel	15		1930	310-room hotel was last renovated in the 1990s; original structural an example of Streamline Moderne architecture	
Halifax Station	1161 Hollis Street	Halifax	Railway Station	3		1928	Example of Beaux Arts-style	
1801 Hollis Street	1801 Hollis Street	Halifax	Office Building	22	87 m (285 ft)	1985	Located near Halifax's waterfront and is home to many prominent businesses.	
Alderney Landing	2 Ochterloney Street	Dartmouth	Multi-use Building	4		1999		
CIBC Building	1809 Barrington Street	Halifax	Office Building	16	66 m (217 ft)	1977	Also known as the CIBC building.	
Bank of Montreal Building	5151 George Street	Halifax	Office Building	18	73 m (240 ft)	1971	The BMO building is located near the waterfront, and is home to the Bank of Montreal in Halifax.	
Dominion Public Building	1713 Bedford Row	Halifax	Office Building	13	53.27 m (174.8 ft)	1929; 1936	Example of Art Deco style in Halifax	
Halifax City Hall	1841 Argyle Street	Halifax	Municipal Government Building	3		1890	Late Victorian and Second Empire structure	
The Vuze	5599 Fenwick Street	Halifax	Residential	32	98 m (322 ft)	1971	Fenwick Tower (formerly known as Fenwick Place) was a residence for the nearby Dalhousie University, and is now a private apartment building.	
Scotiabank Centre	1800 Argyle Street	Halifax	Multi-use Building			1978	Hockey arena home to the Halifax Mooseheads, with a capacity of 10,000-15,000, depending on the event. Example of Brutalist architecture	
World Trade and Convention Centre	1800 Argyle Street	Halifax	Convention Centre	5		1985	Connected to Halifax Metro Centre and to be replaced with new WTCC, an 18-storey hotel and a 14-storey office building	
Delta Halifax	1990 Barrington Street	Halifax	Hotel	12	39.84 m (130.7 ft)	1972	Also referred to as Chateau Halifax when completed for CP Hotels	
Halifax Shopping Centre	7001 Mumford Road	Halifax	Shopping Centre	2		1962	160 stores	
Loyola Residence Tower	5865 Gorsebrook Avenue	Halifax	Residential/University Residential	22	67 m (220 ft)	1971	The Loyola Residence Tower is a residence of Saint Mary's University.	
Maritime Centre	1505 Barrington Street	Halifax	Office Building	20	78 m (256 ft)	1977	The Maritime Center is an office building that was formerly the headquarters of Maritime Telephone and Telegraph, which the building was named after. Site of former Capitol Theatre.	
Province House	1726 Hollis Street	Halifax	Government Building	3		1819	Canada's oldest seat of government and example of Palladian architecture	
Purdy's Wharf Towers I and II	1959 and 1969 Upper Water Street	Halifax	Office Buildings	20; 22	74 m (243 ft); 88 m (289 ft)	1990	An office complex of two towers, a smaller office building, and a parkade located on the waterfront. They use the waters of Halifax Harbour to cool the buildings.	
Queen Square	45 Alderney Drive	Dartmouth	Office Building	19	69.66 m (228.5 ft)	1975	The tallest building in the downtown core of Dartmouth, Nova Scotia.	
Royal Centre	5161 George Street	Halifax	Office Building	12	52 m (171 ft)	1960	Office tower in the downtown core of Halifax.	
Scotia Square Complex	5201 Duke Street	Halifax	Shopping Centre	2		1960s-1970s	A system of buildings connected by pedways and tunnels. It houses a mall, two hotels, and three offices towers.	
Barrington Tower	1894 Barrington Street	Halifax	Office Building	20	84 m (276 ft)	1971	Example of Brutalist architecture	
Cogswell Tower	2000 Barrington Street	Halifax	Office Building	14	79 m (259 ft)	1975	Example of Brutalist architecture	
Duke Tower	5251 Duke Street	Halifax	Office Building	16	71 m (233 ft)	1970	Example of Brutalist architecture	
Saint Mary's University	923 Robie Street	Halifax	University					
Shirreff Hall	6385 South Street	Halifax	University Residence	4		1923	Presently the oldest university residence building in use at Dalhousie University.	
St. Mary's Basilica	5221 Spring Garden Road	Halifax	Religious Building		58 m (190 ft)	1874	The Norman-Gothic Roman Catholic church in Downtown Halifax and recently designated a National Historic Site.	
TD Centre	1791 Barrington Street	Halifax	Office Building	21	83 m (272 ft)	1974/2014	The TD Tower is an office building home to the Toronto Dominion bank in Halifax.	
Tuft's Cove Generating Station	315 Windmill Road	Dartmouth	Power Plant		157 m (515 ft) (smokestack)	1965	Distinctive striped smokestacks of a fossil-fuel burning electrical generating station.	
Veith House	3115 Veith Street	Halifax	Institutional Building	4		1919 (rebuilt)	The former Halifax Protestant Children's Orphanage	
Icon Bay	50 Bedford Highway	Halifax	Residential	21	75 m (246 ft)	2016		
Metropolitan Place	99 Wyse Road	Dartmouth	Office Building	16	66.40 m (217.8 ft)	1987		
