= Royal Centre =

Royal Centre or Royal Center may refer to:

- Royal Center, Indiana, United States
- The Royal Center Tower, a viewing tower in the city of Niagara Falls in Canada
- The Royal Centre for Defence Medicine, a medical facility in Birmingham in England
- The Royal Centre (Halifax), an office tower in the city of Halifax in Canada
- The Royal Centre (Vancouver), a retail and office complex in the city of Vancouver in Canada
- The Royal Centre in the city of Nottingham in England, comprising:
  - The Theatre Royal, Nottingham
  - The Royal Concert Hall, Nottingham
  - The Royal Centre tram stop
