= Queen Square (Dartmouth, Nova Scotia) =

Office building in Nova Scotia, Canada

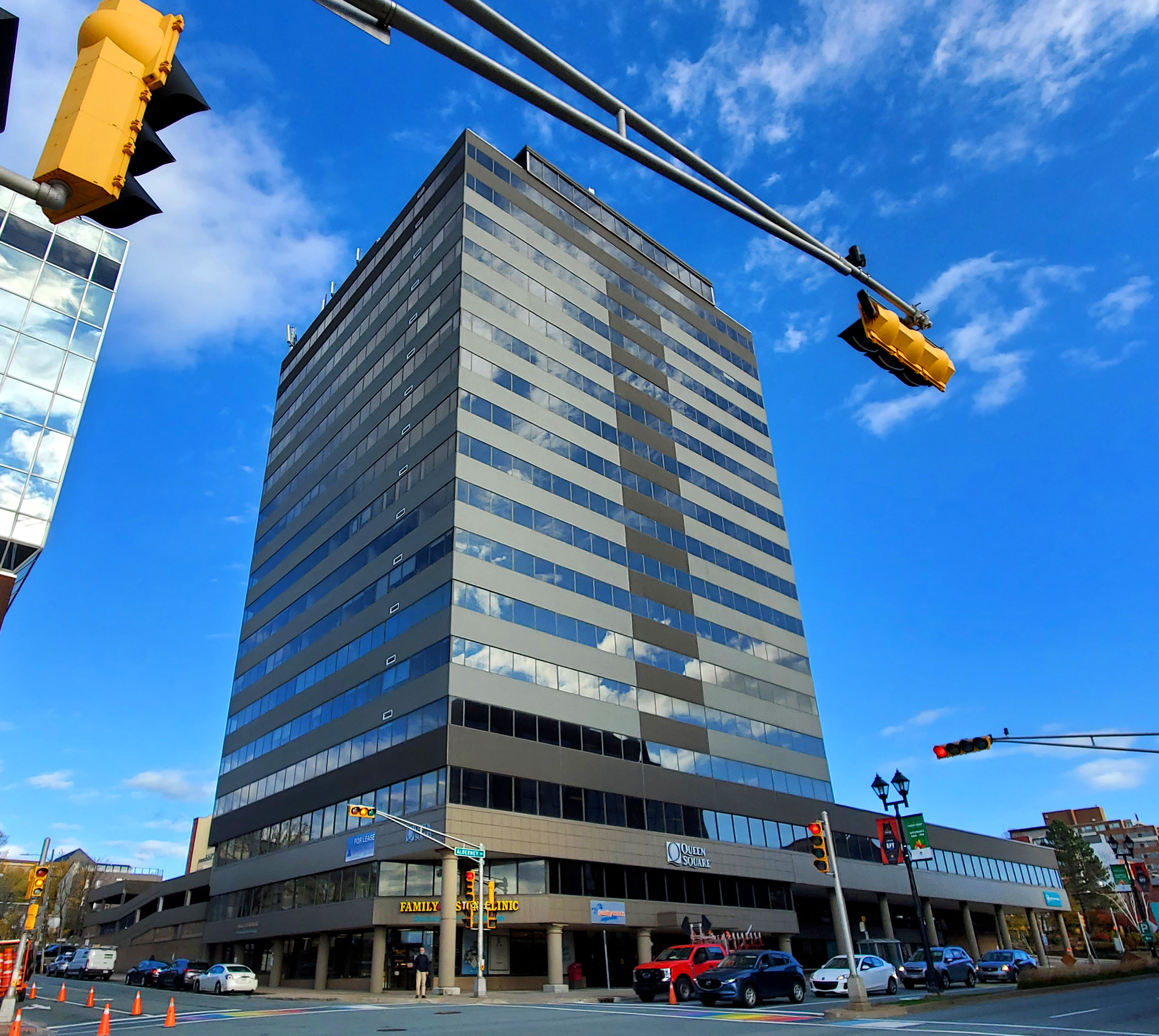
- Queen Square in November 2021
- Interactive map of the Queen Square area

General information
- Type: Office
- Architectural style: Modernist
- Location: Downtown Dartmouth, 45 Alderney Drive
- Coordinates: 44°39′55″N 63°34′10″W
- Completed: 1975
- Owner: Novacorp Properties Limited

Height
- Top floor: 18

Other information
- Public transit: Halifax–Dartmouth Ferry, Halifax Transit

Website
- novacorpproperties.com/listing/queen-square

Queen Square is an office building in downtown Dartmouth, Nova Scotia, part of the Halifax Regional Municipality. At 18 floors (there is no 13th floor), Queen Square is the tallest building in the downtown Dartmouth area, and is located on Alderney Drive across from Alderney Gate. The building was constructed in 1975.

The Government of Canada is the largest tenant in the building, occupying 11 of 18 floors, with Environment Canada (including the Atlantic division of the Meteorological Service of Canada and the Canadian Hurricane Centre) being the largest, occupying 8 floors. Presently, the 19th floor, which was the former home of Patterson Broadcasters CFDR and CFRQ (Q104) radio and later the Meteorological Service of Canada, is occupied by M5 Marketing Communications; the MSC moved to the 3rd floor after safety concerns arose following Hurricane Juan of 2003.

== See also ==
- Halifax Regional Municipality
- Dartmouth, Nova Scotia
- List of buildings in the Halifax Regional Municipality
