= Downtown Dartmouth =

- Downtown
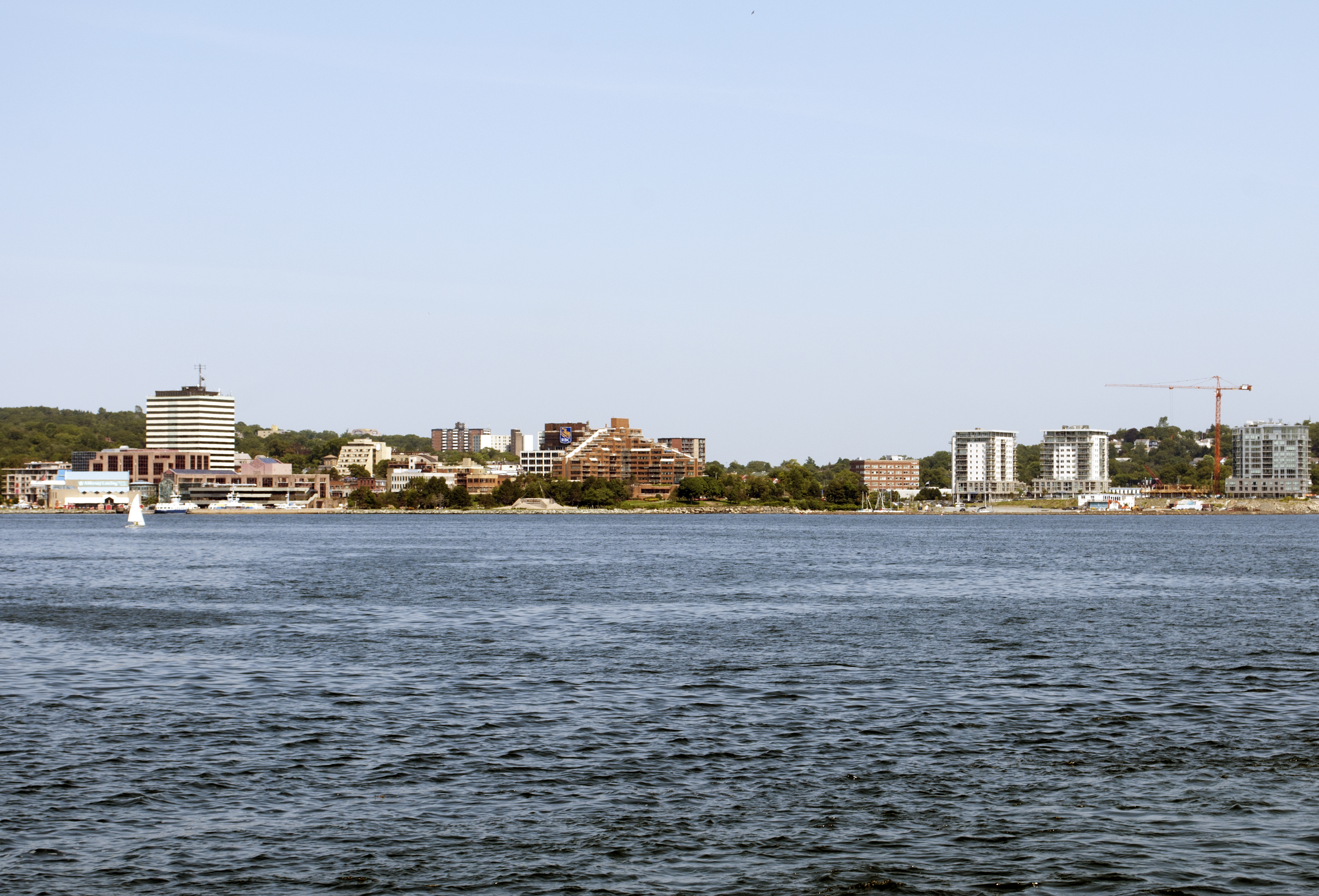

- Location within Nova Scotia
- Coordinates: 44°39′56.83″N 63°33′59.45″W
- Country: Canada
- Province: Nova Scotia
- Municipality: Halifax
- Community council: Harbour East - Marine Drive Community Council
- Community: Dartmouth
- District: 5

Area
  - Total: 0.36 km^{2} (0.14 sq mi)

Downtown Dartmouth is the main central business district of Dartmouth in Halifax, Nova Scotia, Canada. It is part of the Capital District of the Province.

== Business and buildings ==
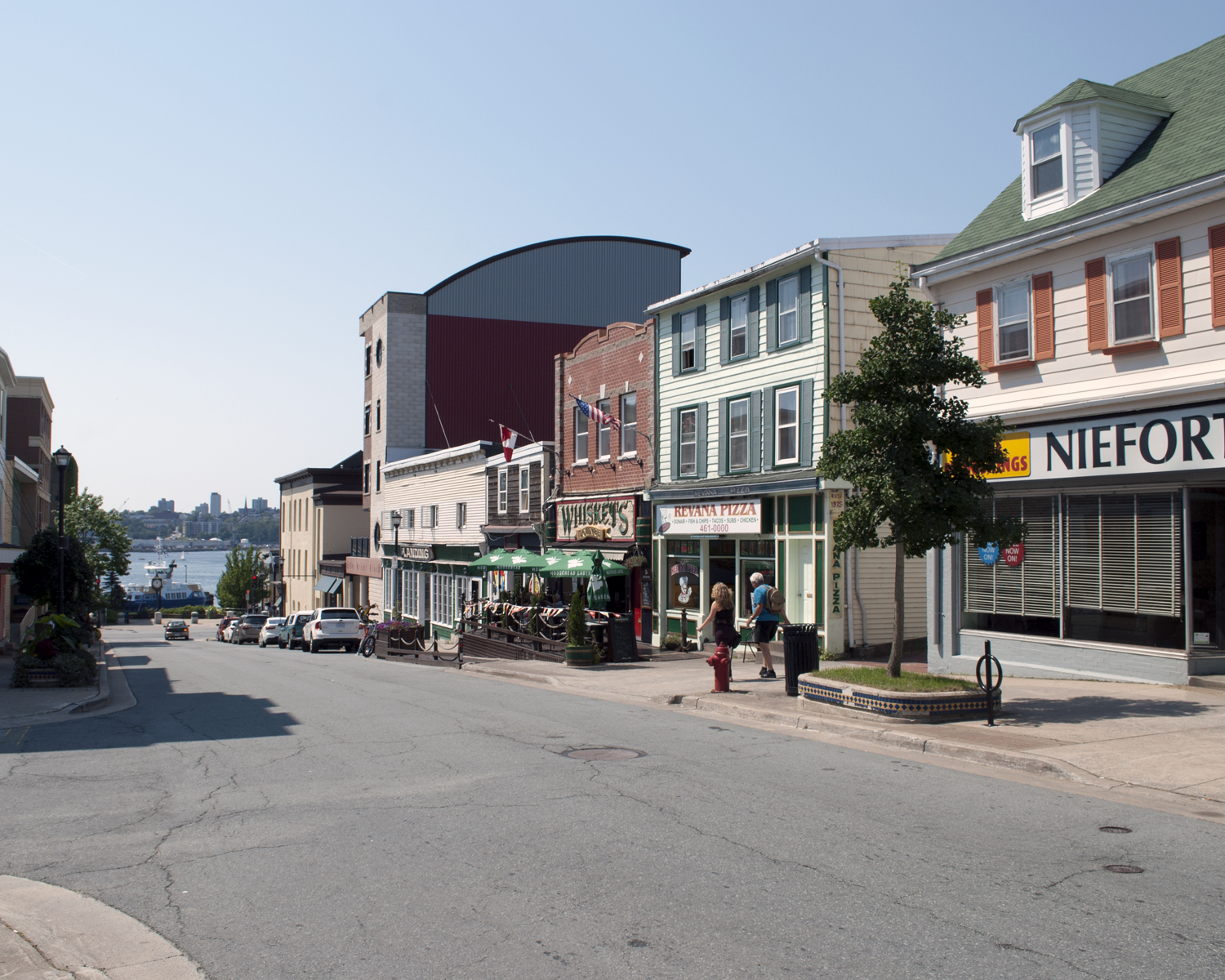
Downtown Portland Alderney

Located in downtown Dartmouth are Alderney Gate which houses a branch of the Halifax Public Libraries and other municipal office space, the Alderney Landing market, gallery and theatre building, the 19-story highrise office building Queen Square, as well as the main branches of the Royal Bank of Canada and CIBC. Also in the area there several condominium highrise buildings. The "Restaurant 73" building on 73 Alderney Drive is the oldest commercial brick building on the Dartmouth side of the harbour. Downtown Dartmouth also features historic landmarks such as the Quaker Whaler House, one of the oldest buildings in Halifax Regional Municipality (open to the public seasonally) and Evergreen House, Victorian home to nationally acclaimed folklorist, Helen Creighton (open year-round).

== Geography ==
Downtown Dartmouth is a rather compact area of about 36 ha (89 acres).

== Transportation ==
A ferry service, operated by Halifax Transit, connects Alderney Gate in downtown Dartmouth to downtown Halifax on the other side of Halifax Harbour. North America's oldest continuously operating saltwater ferry service was started in 1752 by one man rowing customers across the harbour for three cents per trip. The three main streets are Alderney Drive (Trunk 7), Portland Street (Route 207), and Ochterloney Street. Along Alderney Drive and north of the downtown is the CN railyard. CN's Dartmouth Subdivision (a freight line) runs along the waterfront to Autoport near Eastern Passage.

Downtown Dartmouth is also served by numerous Halifax Transit bus routes connecting to other parts of Dartmouth. These routes run on Alderney Drive, allowing passengers to transfer to the Alderney Gate ferry terminal.

== Parks ==
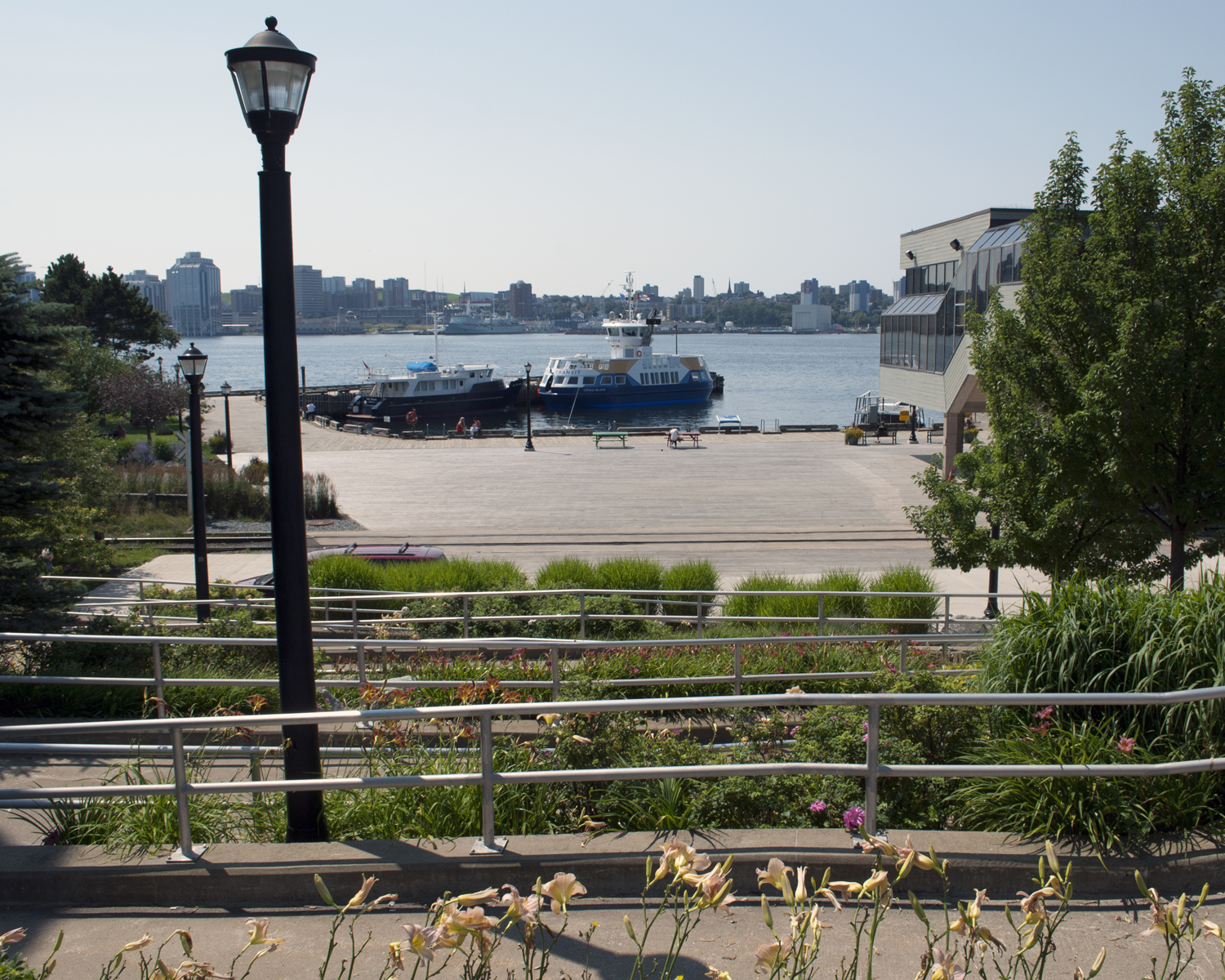
Dartmouth Landing

Ferry Terminal Park is the park space along the waterfront adjacent to the Dartmouth Ferry Terminal. In it resides the World Peace Pavilion, opened during the 1995 Halifax G7 Economic Summit. Conceived by Metro Youth for Global Unity, this structure contains stones and bricks donated by more than 70 countries, lying on a bed of Nova Scotian sand. Also within the Ferry Terminal Park is the huge bronze propeller from the CCGS John A. Macdonald, an icebreaker damaged during its 1969 journey through the Northwest Passage, as well as the inlaid granite compass rose in the park, which is a replica of the compass detail on a 1749 map of Halifax Harbour. Extending from Alderney Landing is the Events Plaza, a specially designed and equipped outdoor space for festivals and events. Eastern Front Theatre performs at Alderney Landing's theatre.

The Leighton Dillman Scenic Garden, named after a diligent voluntary keeper of the gardens, sits adjacent to Alderney Drive on a hillside of what is left of the Dartmouth Commons, approximately 300 acres (1.2 km^{2}) set aside by the government in the late 18th century for the settlers' common use. Only a small portion of the Commons today remains.

== Past industry and redevelopment ==
On Dartmouth Cove were the former Dartmouth Marine Slips, former site of the Nantucket Whaling Company. The Dartmouth Marine Slips were purchased in the 1990s by Irving Shipbuilding, owners of Halifax Shipyard which became known for a time as the Halifax Shipyards. Irving operating the two sites together with the marine slips specializing in smaller and faster repair jobs and employing about 44 people. In 2003, Irving announced plans to sell the Slips. Forty-four workers still employed at the shipyard were relocated to other Irving sites in the HRM region. The Dartmouth Marine Slips closed on June 20, 2003. The plans for development of the property, called Kings Wharf, were published in on July 31, 2007, and a long term construction program began in 2009. Plans for the tallest building in eastern Canada have been introduced and talked about for several years but construction has been delayed with no confirmed start date given.
