= BGO =

BGO can refer to:

- Bismuth germanate, a scintillating chemical compound
- BGO Records (Beat Goes On), a British record label
- Battlestar Galactica Online, an MMO by Bigpoint
- Bergen Airport, Flesland (IATA: BGO) in Bergen, Norway
- Burke-Gaffney Observatory, at Saint Mary's University in Halifax, Nova Scotia, Canada
