= Sweet Basil Building =

Heritage building in Nova Scotia, Canada

Coordinates: 44°39′7.75″N 63°34′27.54″W

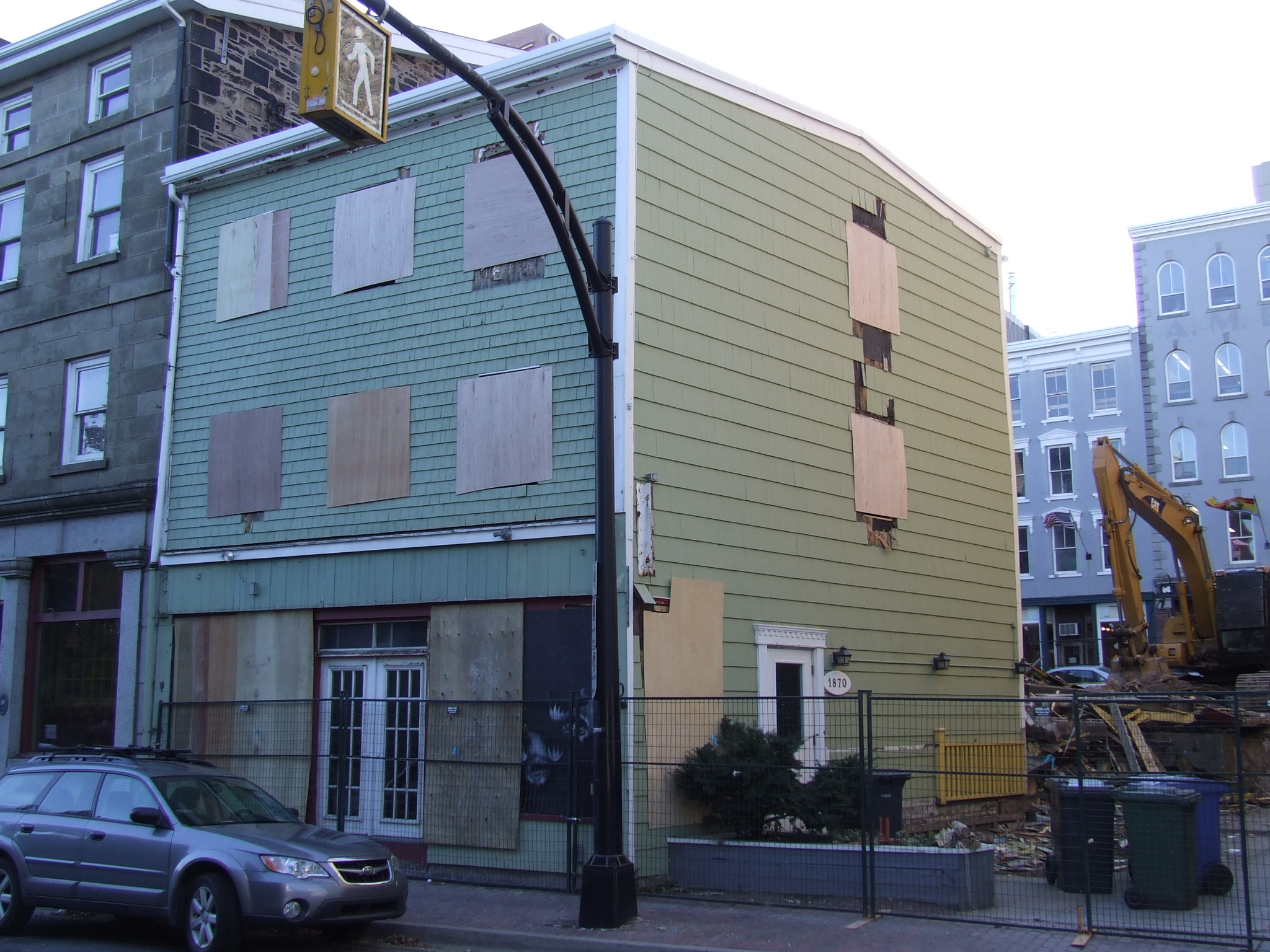
The Sweet Basil Building, just prior to demolition in November 2008. The Harrington MacDonald-Briggs Building, also facing demolition can be seen to the right.

The Sweet Basil Building, also known as the P. Martin Liquors Building, was a heritage building on the waterfront of Halifax, Nova Scotia, Canada which was demolished by Halifax developer Armour Group in November 2008 as part of the company's controversial Waterside Centre Development proposal.

== History ==
The building, known by the name of its last occupant, a Halifax restaurant, was built in the 1840s. It was a three-story wood-frame building, the last wooden building on Halifax's Water Street and was typical of the “Sailortown” buildings which served seafarer's in Nova Scotia's Age of Sail. It stood beside the oldest storefront in Halifax, the 1820 Harrington MacDonald-Briggs Building and faced the preserved warehouses and shipping offices of Privateer's Wharf, a National Historic Site. The building served as a sailor's boarding house, liquor store, confectionery, grocery store and restaurant. The building was rented to a successful Halifax restaurant but Armour group argued that it was uneconomical because the upper floors were not suited for profitable modern office space. The last tenant, the Sweet Basil Bistro, reluctantly left the building after 19 years on the site due to the redevelopment.

== Heritage Status and Demolition ==
The Sweet Basil Building was designated a municipally protected heritage building in 1981. It was also a nationally recognized building under the federal Historic Places program. However Armour Group overturned the designation in court in 2008 arguing that it was designated in error.

Armour Group wished to use the land to build a nine-story office tower called the Waterside Centre, which involved the demolition of six heritage buildings, although the facades of some would be reconstructed at street level. The project faced widespread public opposition at municipal hearings in September 2008 and was narrowly rejected by the council of Halifax Regional Municipality on October 21. However Armour Group announced that they would appeal the decision to Nova Scotia's Utility and Review Board, on October 31, the same day as his company began demolition of the Sweet Basil Building|. The Board overturned Council's decision and approved the controversial office tower on March 26, 2009, and Halifax Council voted not to further oppose the development and or try and save the remaining buildings on April 7, 2009.

After boarding windows and demolishing exterior parts of the building on October 21, the entire building was demolished early Sunday morning, November 2, 2008. Promoters of downtown development such as the Halifax Chamber of Commerce noted that the demolition and disputed development highlight the need for a more streamlined development process. Heritage advocates such as Heritage Trust of Nova Scotia pointed to the demolition as a sign of the weakness of municipal heritage designations and the lack of any heritage districts in downtown Halifax.

== See also ==
- List of historic places in Halifax, Nova Scotia
