= TD Centre (Halifax, Nova Scotia) =

Office building in Halifax, Canada

Coordinates: 44°38′54.89″N 63°34′28.07″W

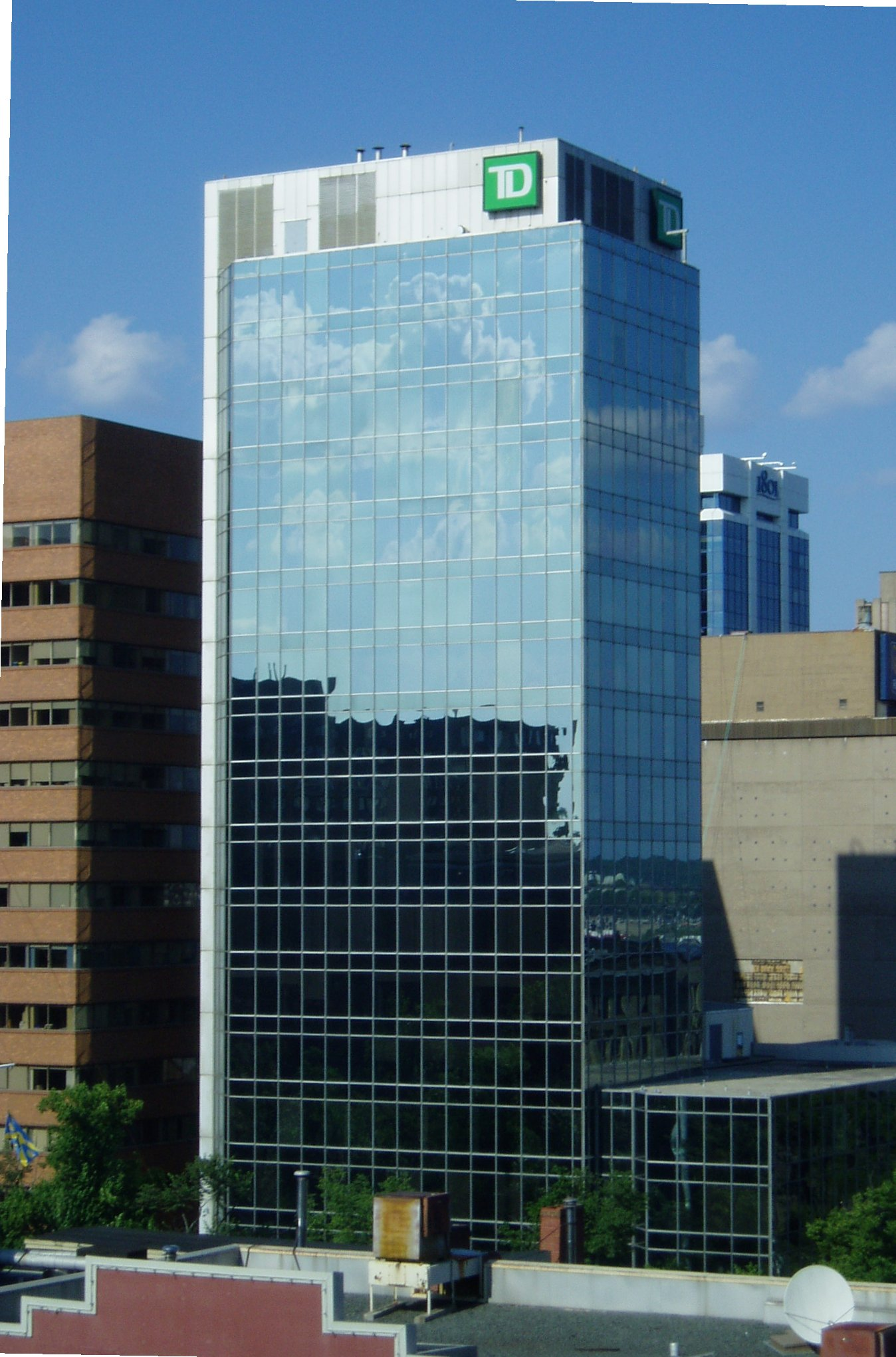
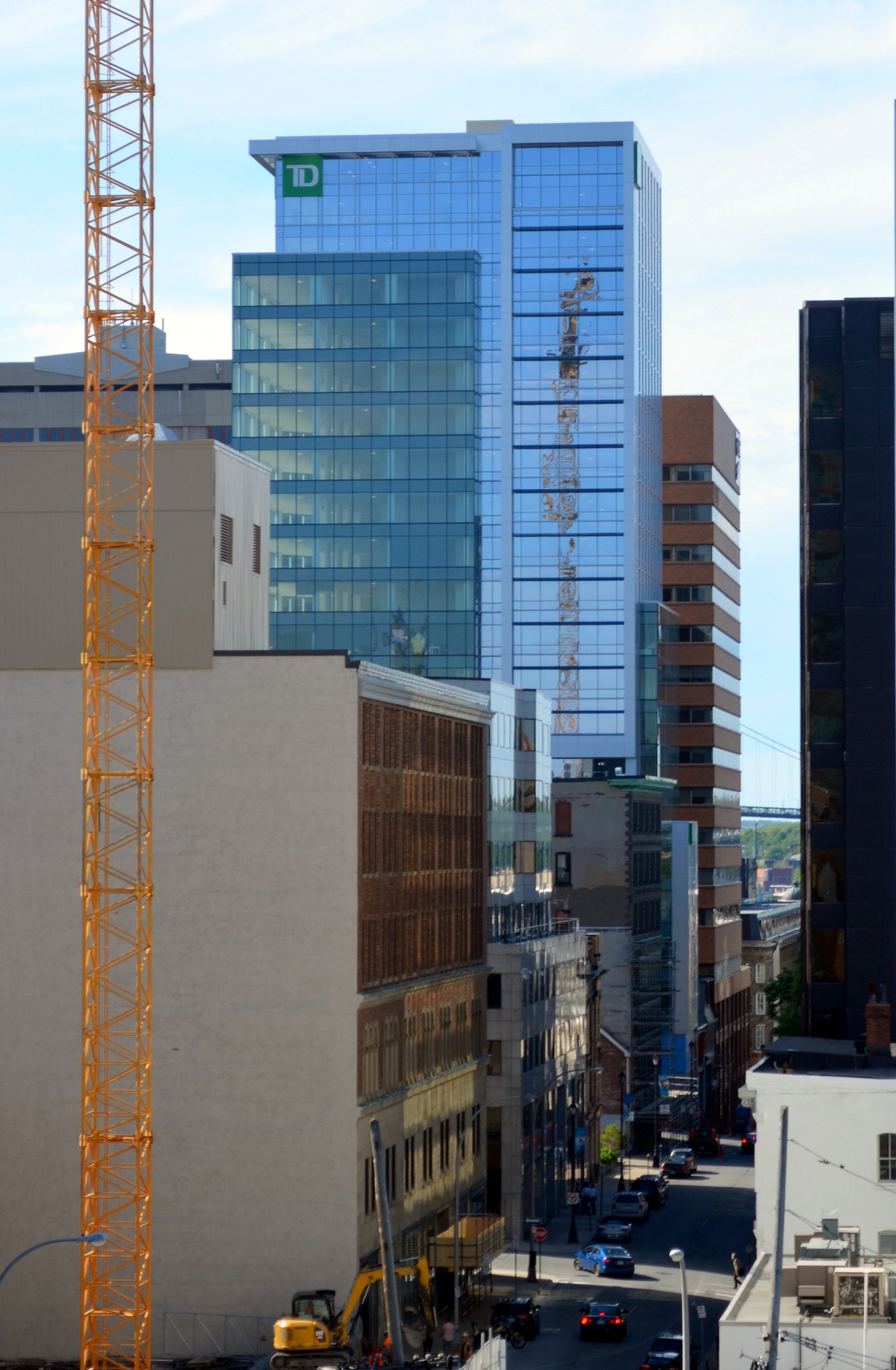
TD Tower before and after expansion – viewed from the west and south, respectively.

TD Centre is an office building home to the Toronto-Dominion Bank (TD Bank) in downtown Halifax, Nova Scotia, Canada. The complex was completed in 1977 and substantially reconstructed in 2014.

The TD Centre originally stood at 73 metres with 18 floors. Its 2014 expansion added 10 metres to the building's overall height and three additional floors of office space. The building is adjacent to the CIBC Building to which it is connected through the Downtown Halifax Link system. On its remaining sides it is bounded by Barrington Street on the west, George Street on the south and Granville Street on its lowest, eastern side.

== History ==
=== Original development ===
The TD Centre originally opened in 1977, and was wholly owned by Cadillac Fairview. It originally offered approximately 104,000 square feet (9,700 m^{2}) of net rentable area, composed of 94,000 square feet (8,700 m^{2}) of office space and the remaining 10,000 square feet (930 m^{2}) of retail space.

=== Expansion project ===
In 2010, TDB Halifax Holdings Limited announced its intention to enlarge the structure on its east side and to make substantial modifications to the roof (including an increase in height of 10 metres). The changes roughly doubled the original floor area to about 200,000 square feet (19,000 m^{2}) and resulted in a more economical structure using "green" technologies.

The project, which entailed stripping the building to its original concrete frame while it continued under occupancy, was designed by Lydon Lynch Architects. It incorporates the facade of an historic 19th century building, originally home to a leather harness maker, on its Granville Street level.

Construction began in November 2012 with the expanded structure topping out in late 2014. In July 2013, building owner TDB Halifax Holdings announced it had signed a new 10-year lease with TD Bank Group to continue as the building's anchor tenant.

The Building incorporates photovoltaic sun-shades on the south facade and on the street level sidewalk canopies. Photovoltaic cells have been laminated between sheets of glass to form a shade device that generates electricity while it is acts as a shade and reduces glare for computer screens.

== See also ==
- List of tallest buildings in the Halifax Regional Municipality
- List of buildings in the Halifax Regional Municipality
