= 1801 Hollis Street =

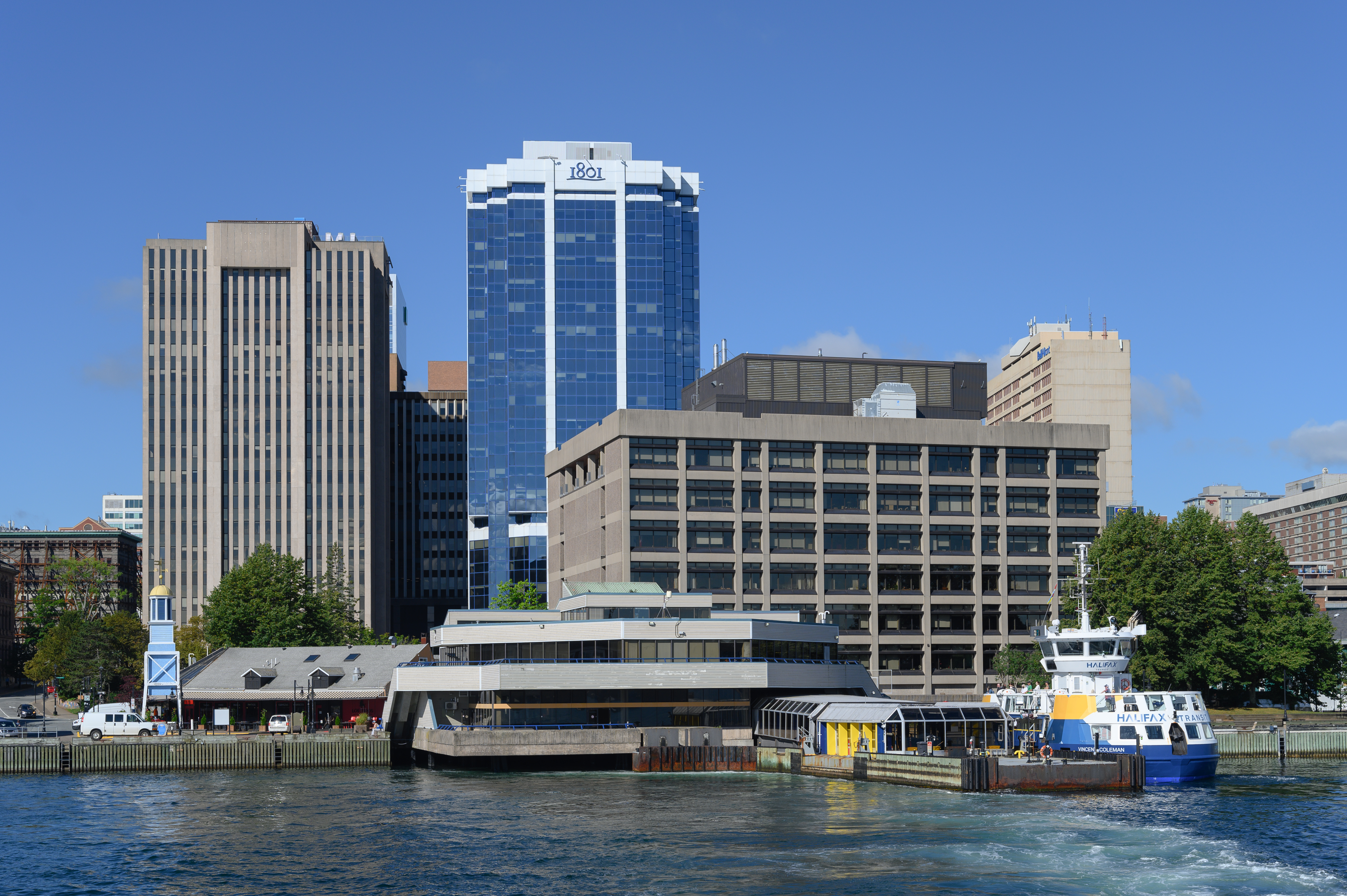
- 1801 Hollis Street as viewed from Halifax Harbour in 2022

General information
- Status: Completed
- Type: Office building
- Location: 1801 Hollis Street, Halifax, Nova Scotia, B3J 3N4
- Coordinates: 44°38′58.1″N 63°34′23.5″W
- Opened: 19 June 1985
- Client: Central Trust
- Owner: Groupe Mach

Height
- Height: 86.6 m (284 ft)

Technical details
- Material: Reinforced concrete
- Floor count: 22
- Floor area: 223,213 sq ft (20,737.2 m^{2})
- Lifts/elevators: 5

Design and construction
- Architecture firm: Clifford Lawrie Bolton Ritchie
- Developer: Manuduke Limited
- Structural engineer: Read Jones Christoffersen
- Main contractor: Thomas Fuller Construction

Other information
- Parking: 67 spaces
- Public transit: Water Street Terminal

1801 Hollis Street is an office building in downtown Halifax, Nova Scotia, Canada. Completed in 1985, it is one of the tallest buildings in Halifax, at 87 metres, with 22 floors. It was built as the corporate headquarters of Central Trust, one of the largest trust companies in Canada in the 1980s, and was originally known as Central Trust Tower.

== History ==
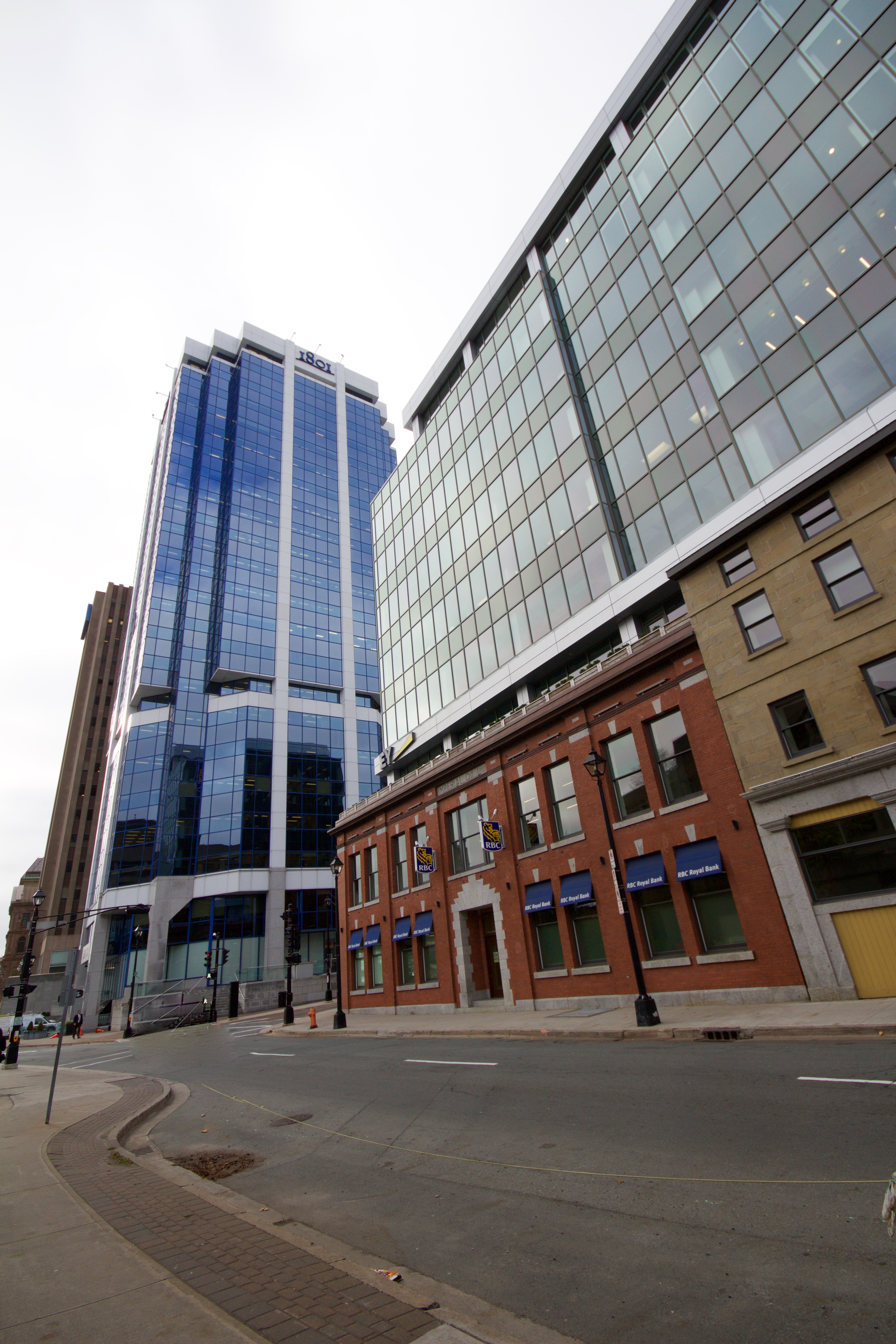
1801 Hollis Street (left) and RBC Waterside Centre (right) as viewed from Upper Water St.

=== Site background ===
The site of 1801 Hollis Street was part of a bustling section of the original Halifax townsite (founded in 1749) known as Foreman's Division. The site, nearer the harbour shoreline prior to land reclamation, was used for a variety of commercial and residential purposes. There is archival evidence that two banks were located there in the 19th century.

By the 1980s, the site was home to several smaller buildings housing restaurants and offices.

=== Development ===
Demolition permits for the existing buildings on the site were issued by the City of Halifax on 2 March 1983, the same day the project was announced, and demolition work began the same week. The Bluenose Restaurant and the Boy Scouts of Canada had already vacated the site, while Sanford's Second Storey Restaurant, at Hollis and Duke, had not yet been evicted. The wood-frame Boy Scouts building was torn down on 5 March 1983, along with an office building at 1806 Upper Water Street (once home to the Black United Front) as well as the former home of the Bluenose Restaurant.

The new office tower was designed by architecture firm Clifford Lawrie Bolton Ritchie and structural engineering consultant Read Jones Christoffersen, both of Toronto. It was developed by Manuduke Limited, a joint venture of Manufacturers Life (Manulife) and Clarence Investment Corporation, and built by Fuller Construction. The development was approved by Halifax council in April 1983. It was built as the corporate headquarters of the Central Trust company, which was the main tenant.

=== Archaeological investigation ===
Excavation of the site commenced without an archaeological survey. After a NSCAD student, who had observed objects of historical significance in the construction pit, contacted the Nova Scotia Museum in January 1984, archaeologists from Parks Canada and Saint Mary's University were called in. By this time, the site was already badly damaged, with most material having been trucked away to a landfill and the archaeological context destroyed. Thanks to intervention by Halifax mayor Ron Wallace, the contractor, Fuller Construction, agreed to shift work away from the comparatively undisturbed northwestern corner of the site to permit a "rescue recovery" operation carried out by Saint Mary's archeology staff and student volunteers. Around 1,000 artifacts were collected there, including "ceramics, clay pipes, bricks, leather and an assortment of miscellaneous items".

A separate salvage operation was carried out at the landfill. In total, around 25,000 artifacts were collected, mostly ceramics (18,673 items). The findings of these efforts were documented in a report, Artifacts from Eighteenth Century Halifax: The Central Trust Archaeological Project, produced with support from the City of Halifax and Parks Canada staff, and published by the Saint Mary's University Archaeology Laboratory in 1987. The Manufacturers Life company donated $2,000 to Saint Mary's for the purchase of a chemical to aid in the preservation of leather items recovered from the site. At the official opening ceremony of the new building, the insurance company presented a further cheque of $20,000 to Saint Mary's, which was put toward the purchase of a freeze drying unit needed for leather preservation.

Some of the artifacts recovered from the Central Trust site were put on permanent display at the Nova Scotia Museum of Natural History.

=== Opening and renaming ===
Originally known as the Central Trust Tower and built at a cost of around C$25 million, the building was officially opened by Nova Scotia premier John Buchanan on 19 June 1985. Also in attendance were senior officials of Manulife and Central Trust, Halifax mayor Ron Wallace, and around 200 businesspeople.

Before opening, Central Trust's branch at the corner of Granville and Duke streets – once the head office of the Eastern Canada Savings and Loan Company – was relocated to the ground floor of the new tower, which involved the transfer of safety deposit boxes by a team of armed guards. Aside from the ground floor, Central Trust also occupied the 18th, 19th, and 20th floors. Other initial tenants included Barrow Nicoll; Dominion Securities Pitfield; Edgecombe Investment Services; Elliott and Page Atlantic; Manufacturers Real Estate; Mathers Travel; and MacInnes, Wilson, Flinn and Wickwire.

The building was also known as the Central Guaranty Trust Tower following the merger of Central Trust and Guaranty Trust Co. Central Guaranty was acquired by the Toronto Dominion Bank in late 1992. The tower was subsequently renamed 1801 Hollis Street.

== Design ==
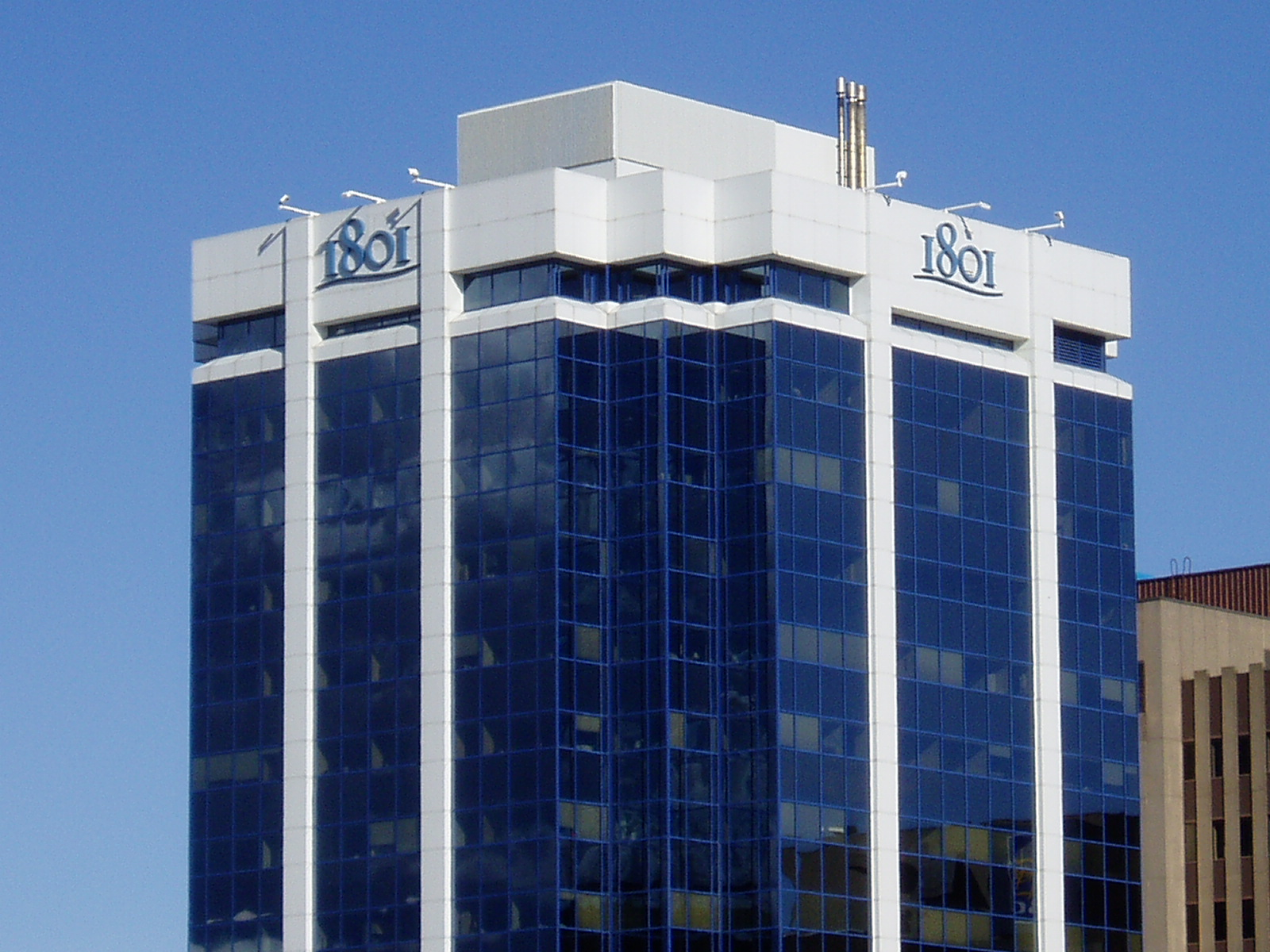
Top portion of the tower

The Toronto architecture firm that designed the building, Clifford Lawrie Bolton Ritchie, had completed several other high-rise projects for Manulife including Manulife Centre, Toronto (1974); Manulife Place, Edmonton (1983); and the North Tower extension of Manulife's head office on Bloor Street in Toronto (1983). For the Central Trust project, the company partnered with Halifax architecture firm Duffus, Romans, Kundzins, Rounsefell Limited.

=== Building details ===
Constructed of reinforced concrete, the building has 22 floors and around 223,213 square feet (20,737.2 m^{2}) of floor space. Each floor is around 10,350 square feet (962 m^{2}). The tower is served by five elevators. The tower is built over a two-floor underground parking garage, above which there are 21 leasable floors (including the ground level) while the 22nd storey is a mechanical penthouse level. At the very top there is a smaller penthouse for the freight elevator machinery (this arrangement allows the freight elevator to serve the 22nd-storey mechanical floor).

The building height is approximately 284 feet (87 m) above Upper Water Street (including the freight elevator penthouse).

The majority of the building is office space, but there is also an HSBC branch on Hollis St. in the space originally home to a Central Trust branch. The underground car park, accessed from Upper Water Street, has 67 parking spaces. The uppermost of the two basement levels is also home to a coffee shop accessed from Upper Water.

=== Exterior and urban design ===
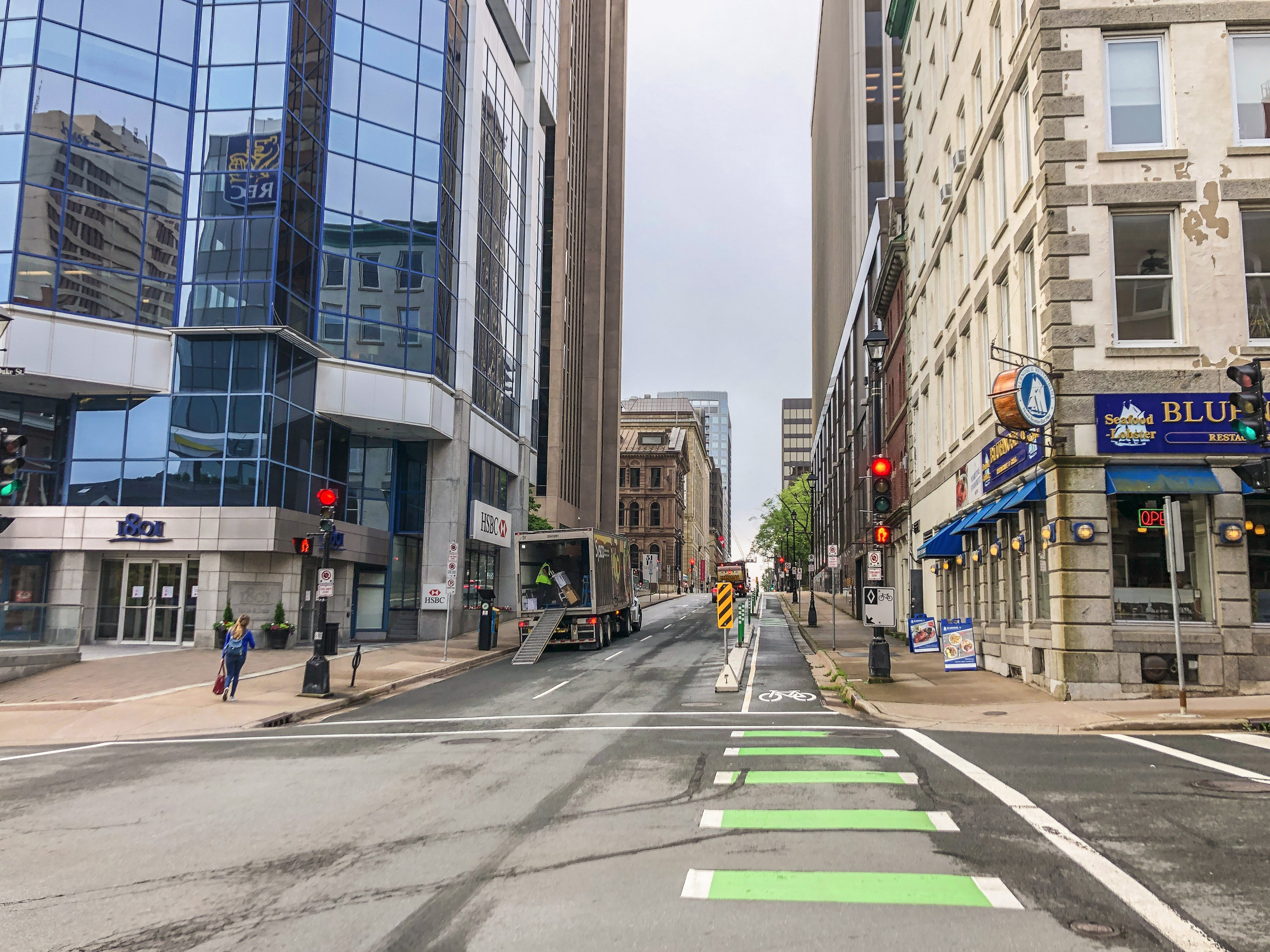
Building entrance on Hollis Street

The exterior enamel cladding and reflective curtain wall are coloured white and blue respectively, the corporate colours of the Central Trust company. In a presentation to Halifax council, architect Michael Clifford explained that the cantilevered and indented elements of the building are designed to echo the medium-rise scale of the surrounding buildings. The floor areas of the ground, second, and eighth storeys are reduced due to the street-level overhang and the indentation at the eighth floor.

The site area is around 18,069 square feet (1,678.7 m^{2}). The building has frontage on three streets: Upper Water, Duke, and Hollis. The building is set back from Duke Street, making space for a small plaza with seating. The development also includes a mid-block pedestrian shortcut, next to 5151 George St., connecting Upper Water and Hollis streets.

== Ownership ==
1801 Hollis Street was purchased by Canadian Real Estate Investment Trust (CREIT) on 30 April 2001 for C$25 million. Ownership of the building passed to Choice Properties REIT, controlled by Loblaw Companies, when that company purchased CREIT in 2018.

In 2022, the building was sold by Choice Properties to Montreal-based Groupe Mach for C$40 million.

== Transportation ==
1801 Hollis Street is located across the street from the Water Street Terminal, a hub for Halifax Transit buses, as well as the Halifax Ferry Terminal.

== See also ==
- List of tallest buildings in Halifax, Nova Scotia
