= Halifax Public Libraries =

Public library system in Nova Scotia, Canada

Coordinates: 44°38′39.5″N 63°34′28.3″W

- Clockwise from top right: Cole Harbour, Central, Musquodoboit Harbour, Sackville, and Shatford Memorial branches.
- Location: 5440 Spring Garden Road; Halifax, Nova Scotia; B3J 1E9, Canada
- Established: 1864 (Citizens Free Library), 1996 (Halifax Public Libraries merger)
- Reference to legal mandate: Libraries Act (Nova Scotia), 1989
- Branches: 14

Collection
- Items collected: business directories, phone books, maps, government publications, books, periodicals, genealogy, local history,
- Size: ~1,164,600 items

Access and use
- Circulation: 4,709,496 (2013-14)
- Population served: 414,400

Other information
- Director: Asa Kachan, Chief Librarian & CEO
- Website: Halifax Public Libraries

Halifax Public Libraries (HPL) is a Canadian public library system, serving residents of Halifax in Nova Scotia. It is the largest public library system in Nova Scotia, with over 2.8 million visits to library branches and 172,520 active registered borrowers or 44% of the municipality's population. With roots that trace back to the establishment of the Citizens' Free Library in 1864, the current library system was created in 1996 during municipal amalgamation, and now consists of 14 branches and a collection of almost 1 million items.

== History ==
=== Early history ===
Halifax Mechanics' Institute was one of a series of Mechanics' Institutes that were set up around the world, after becoming popular in Britain. It housed a subscription library that allowed members who paid a fee to borrow books. The Mechanic's Institutes libraries eventually became public libraries when the establishment of free libraries occurred. One of the members of the Mechanics' Institute about 1835 was Samuel Cunard.

In 1864, the Honourable William Young purchased the heavily indebted Halifax Mechanic’s Library and donated the collection to establish the city’s first free public library, The Citizens’ Free Library. Anyone "above the age of 18 who were of a known and respectable nature" could borrow one book at a time. The library found a permanent home in 1890 on the second floor of City Hall, where the office of the Mayor of Halifax is now located.

Some talks about a new municipally-funded library in 1901 were unsuccessful.

=== Creation of municipal libraries ===
In 1948, Halifax had "a single over-crowded, under-equipped room at the end of a corridor" located in the City Hall building. The conditions and poor services of the Citizens' Free Library room even failed in comparison to much smaller towns in Nova Scotia, such as Amherst.

The Halifax Memorial Library "was born out of a true spirit of collaboration and of steadfast persistence from a variety of service clubs and citizens' groups active" in 1945 immediately after World War II. The first sod was turned on 21 April 1949, in time to celebrate the city’s 200th anniversary. The former central library opened in 1951 as a memorial to the war dead.

The Halifax City Regional Library system added the North Branch Library on Gottingen Street in 1965, the Captain William Spry Public Library in Spryfield in 1983, and the Thomas Raddall Public Library in Clayton Park in 1989. In 1973 and 1974, the Spring Garden Road Library expanded from 25,000 sq.ft. to 38,000 sq.ft. to accommodate increasing demands for space.

The Dartmouth library operated out of the old Dartmouth City Hall on the Dartmouth Common until 1990. The Woodlawn Public Library branch opened in 1975, and the Dartmouth North branch opened in 1996. The Dartmouth Regional Library opened at Alderney Gate in 1990.

=== Halifax Public Libraries ===
The Halifax Public Libraries system was created in 1995 in anticipation of municipal amalgamation, merging the library systems of the cities of Halifax and Dartmouth, and Halifax County.

The Thomas Raddall branch in Clayton Park closed was replaced with the Keshen Goodman Public Library in 2001. and the Woodlawn branch moved to Eisener Boulevard in 2010.

The Halifax Central Library branch can trace its roots to a feasibility study written in 1987. In 2008, the HRM Council approved funding in principle to support construction of a Central Library. Seven years later the Spring Garden branch closed permanently on 30 August 2014 and was replaced by the Halifax Central Library across the street.

The various branches of the Halifax Public Libraries participate in Interlibrary Loan and permit borrowers to return Interlibrary Loan books to any Halifax public library location.

== Branches ==
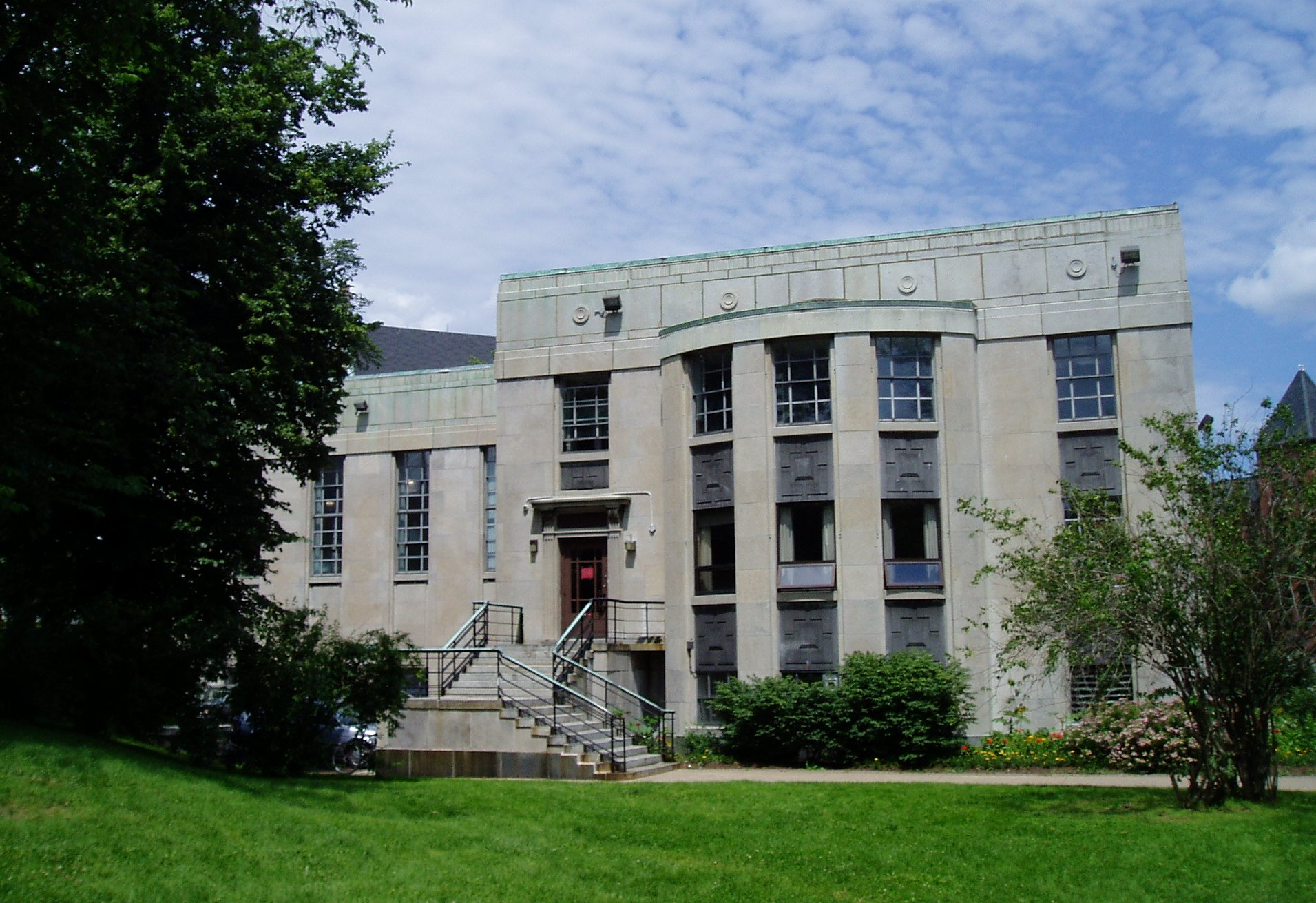
Spring Garden Road Memorial Public Library

- Alderney Gate (Downtown Dartmouth)
- Bedford
- Captain William Spry (Spryfield)
- Cole Harbour
- Dartmouth North
- Halifax Central Library (Spring Garden Road)
- Halifax North Memorial
- J.D. Shatford (Hubbards)
- Keshen Goodman (Clayton Park)
- Musquodoboit Harbour
- Sackville
- Sheet Harbour
- Tantallon
- Woodlawn

=== Former branches ===
- Thomas Raddall (replaced by Keshen Goodman)
- Spring Garden Road Memorial (replaced by Halifax Central Library)

== See also ==
- Cambridge Military Library
- Halifax Tool Library
- Killam Library
