= Dartmouth Commons =

Park in Nova Scotia, Canada

Coordinates: 44°40′8.72″N 63°34′17.72″W

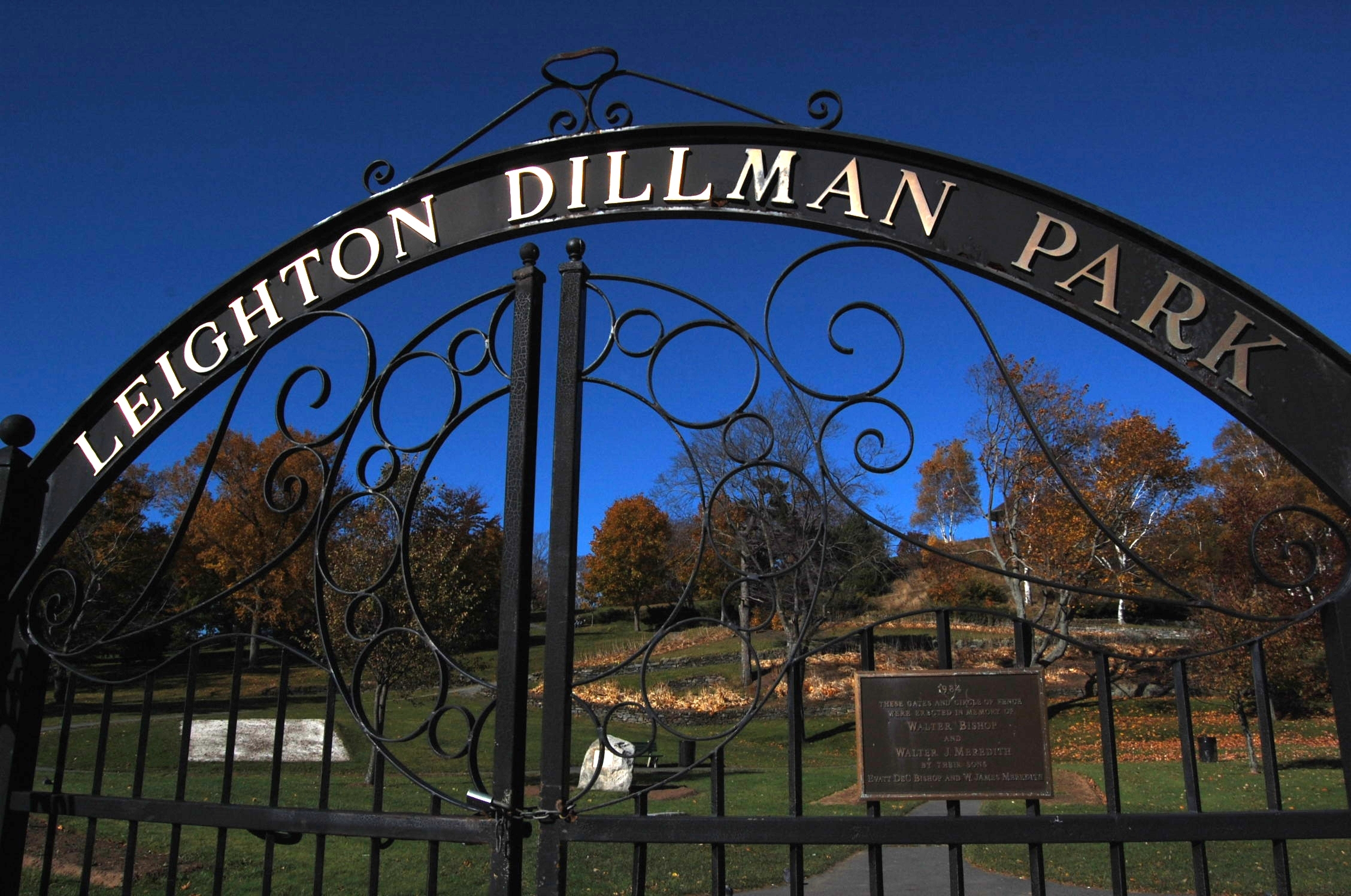
- Entrance to Leighton Dillman Park, Dartmouth Commons
- Interactive map of Dartmouth Commons
- Type: Public park
- Location: Dartmouth Nova Scotia
- Area: 120 hectares (300 acres)
- Created: 1700s
- Operator: Halifax Regional Municipality

The Dartmouth Commons is an approximately 120 hectares (300 acres) area of land set aside by the government in the late 18th century for the settlers common use in Dartmouth Nova Scotia, Canada. Much of it is maintained by the Halifax Regional Municipality. Today the most prominent area is called Leighton Dillman Park, named after a voluntary keeper of the garden.

Other areas of the common are used by: baseball fields, the former Dartmouth City Hall, the Dartmouth Regional Library then after that the Dartmouth Heritage Museum, the Zatzman Sportsplex, Dartmouth High School, Bicentennial Jr. High School, an elementary school called "Park School" (since torn down) and two burial grounds. The baseball fields are named for Arthur H. Merrick who was a co-founder of minor baseball in the City of Dartmouth in 1950. Between the Dartmouth Sportsplex and Dartmouth High School there is the Bridge Transit Terminal, a major hub for Halifax Transit. The former Dartmouth Heritage Museum building has since been demolished, and the area it stands on was turned back into park land.

Under the "Halifax Regional Municipality Act" the municipality cannot develop the Dartmouth Common, nor charge a fee to use the ball fields. The Dartmouth common section of "Halifax Regional Municipality Act" reads:

529 (1) In this Section, "Dartmouth common" means the common of Dartmouth so far as it was vested in the City of Dartmouth on April 22, 1986. (2) The Halifax Regional Municipality shall not sell, lease, license or otherwise alienate the Dartmouth common. (3) Subject to subsection (4), no person shall build on the Dartmouth common. (4) A person may build an addition to a building located on the lands described in the Schedule to Chapter 87 of the Acts of 1994, An Act to Amend Chapter 68 of the Acts of 1986, the Dartmouth Common Act, if the building and the addition are both totally located on those lands. (5) The Dartmouth common is held by the Halifax Regional Municipality in trust for the inhabitants of the municipality. 1998, c. 18, s. 529.

Recent amendments to the Act:

It is recommended that subsection 529 (4) be renumbered to 529 (4)(a) and clause 529(4)(b) be added as follows: (b) The Municipality may build, expand or improve: i) transit facilities, fronting on Nantucket Avenue; and ii) parking lots for the Sportsplex, on the Dartmouth Common to a maximum of 24,000 square metres (5.9 acres).
