= RBC Waterside Centre =

Building in Halifax, Canada

Coordinates: 44°39′7.75″N 63°34′27.57″W

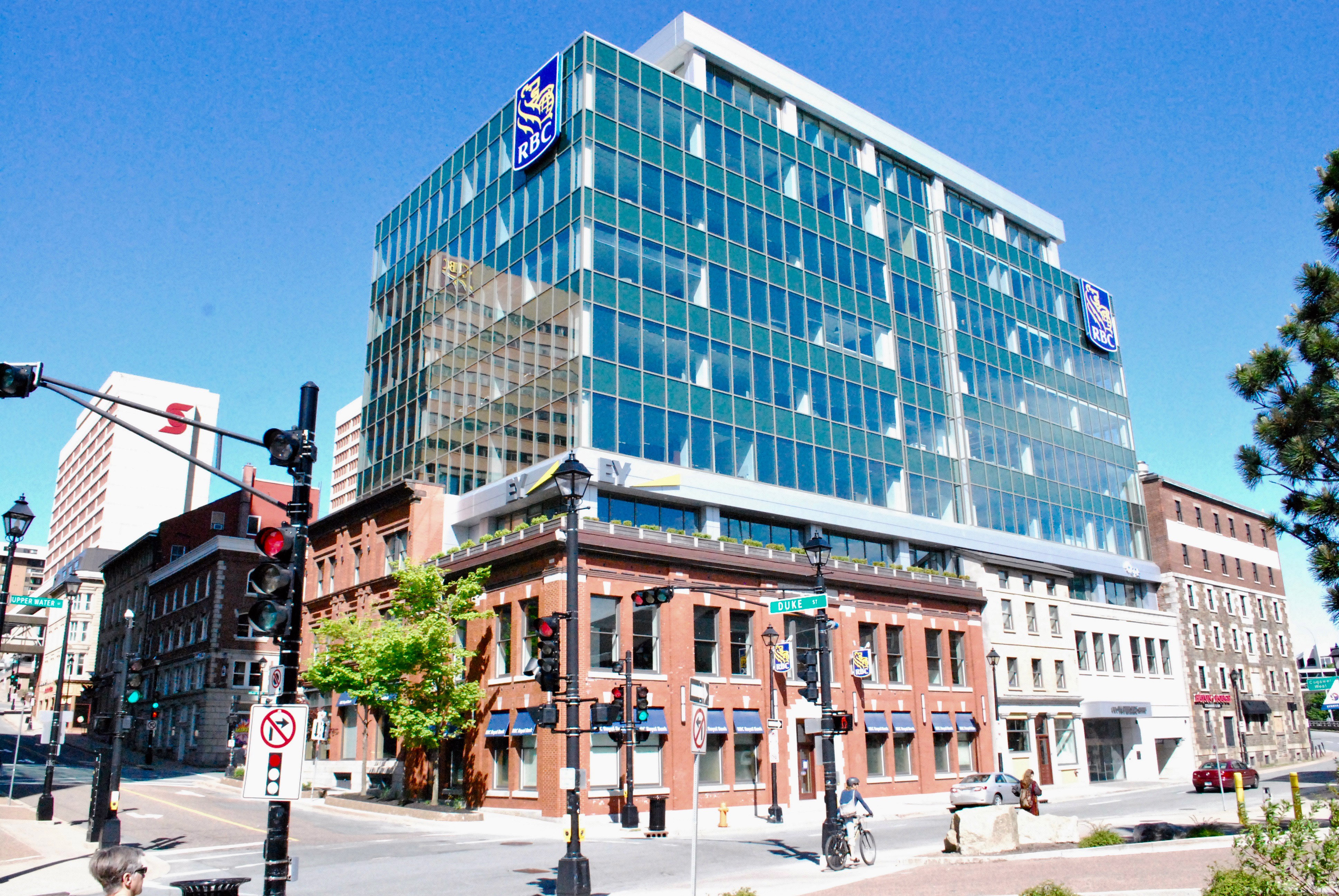
- View from south east corner of RBC Waterside Centre
- Interactive map of the RBC Waterside Centre area

General information
- Status: Completed
- Location: 1871 Upper Water Street; Halifax, Nova Scotia; B3J 1S8
- Completed: 2014
- Cost: CA$16 million
- Owner: Armour Group

Technical details
- Floor count: 9
- Floor area: 85,500 sq. ft.

Design and construction
- Architect: Lydon Lynch
- Developer: Armour Group

The RBC Waterside Centre is a commercial development in the downtown core of Halifax, Nova Scotia, Canada built by local real estate developer Armour Group. The project involves demolishing six heritage buildings and replacing them with a nine storey retail and office building, clad at ground level with the reconstructed facades of most of the former heritage buildings.

== Site ==
The original six buildings occupy a downtown block facing the Halifax waterfront bounded by Upper Water Street, Duke Street, Hollis Street and the Cogswell Interchange. Along with the adjacent waterfront buildings of Historic Properties and the Victorian commercial buildings of the Granville Mall, the site is one of the only intact blocks of 19th-century buildings in Downtown Halifax. It includes the oldest storefront in Halifax and the site of the famous 18th-century tavern “The Great Pontack”, where James Wolfe planned the siege of Louisbourg and Quebec. The buildings have housed commercial and retail tenants, but Armour group has said that the buildings are no longer economical and their replacements by facades should be seen as restoration. The buildings on the block include the 1820 Harrington MacDonald-Briggs Building the oldest remaining commercial building in Halifax, the 1861 Fishwick & Company Building, the 1926 Imperial Oil Building as well as the 1840 Sweet Basil Building, the last wooden "sailortown" building on Halifax's Water Street.

The only building on the historic block not facing demolition by Armour group is the Morse’s Tea Building owned by another developer who has converted the 1841 structure for office use and retained its interior and exterior structure.

== Debate ==
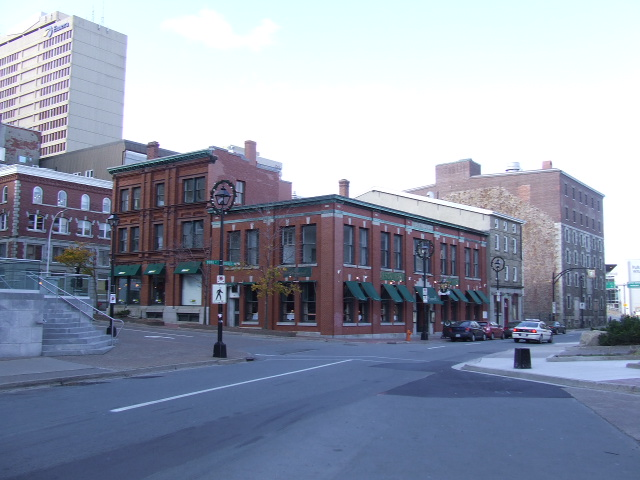
The block prior to redevelopment

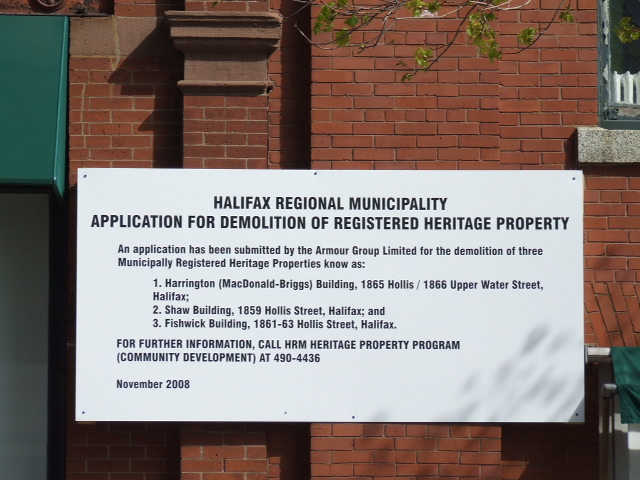
Armour Group's demolition notice for three of the heritage buildings.

The proposed development has split municipal politicians in Halifax. Those opposed, such as the Heritage Trust of Nova Scotia, say that Halifax is losing its small and dwindling number of heritage buildings which are a resource for culture and tourism. Supporters like the Downtown Halifax Business Commission say that developers should be given a free rein to promote economic activity. The debate also led Nova Scotia's Conservative Premier Rodney MacDonald to intervene in the city's politics in support of the development and demolition.

Almost all of the presenters at public hearings in September 2008 opposed the project, including officials in the province's tourism industry. A signature with over 690 names opposing the development was presented to Halifax City Council in October 2008 Possible solutions have been suggested include a land swap or a compromise development but to date all have been rejected by Armour Group except for an offer to reduce the office tower by two stories if given large property tax breaks.

The heritage buildings on the block were saved from demolition in the 1970s when heritage advocates stropped a planned Harbourfront expressway promoted by city traffic engineers and developers which would have demolished all older buildings on the waterfront. The move was seen as key to reviving the Halifax waterfront and Halifax's downtown tourism. Heritage proponents have argued that the pending demolition underscores Halifax's weak heritage laws. Unlike most older North American cities, Halifax has no heritage districts preserving blocks of heritage buildings but only has individual building designation which may easily be overturned by developers seeking demolition.

=== Rejection, appeal and demolition ===
The development was rejected by the council of Halifax Regional Municipality in a tie vote on October 21, 2008. The head of Armour Group, Ben McCrea, initially said he would not appeal as it would create bad publicity. However Doug MacIsaac of Armour Group announced on October 31 that his company would appeal council's decision to Nova Scotia’s Utility and Review Board, the same day as his company began demolition of the first of the six buildings, the former Sweet Basil restaurant. The Board overturned Halifax council's decision on March 26, 2009, and Halifax council voted on April 7 not to appeal the Board's decision.

== Completion and occupancy ==
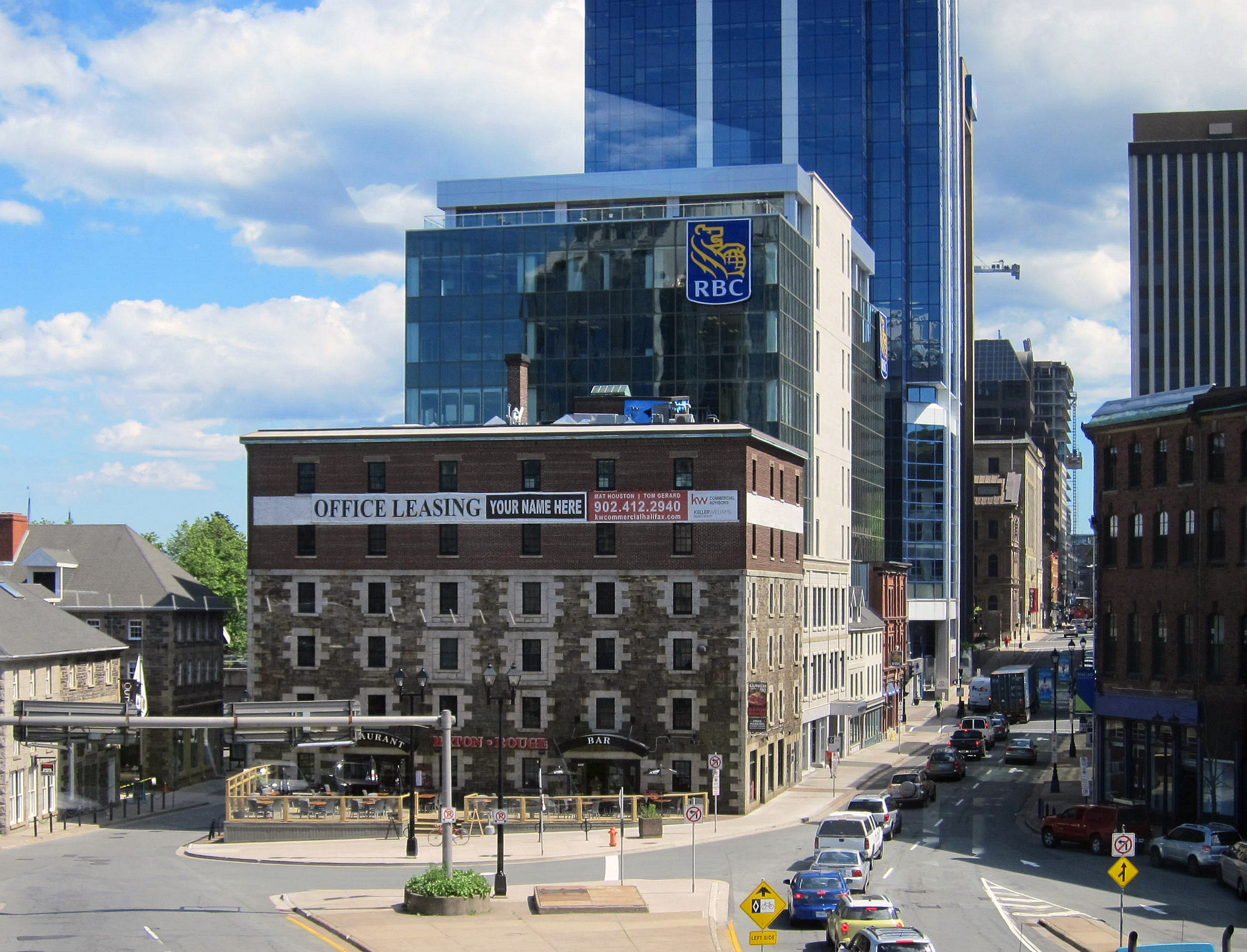
The completed development

The development was substantially completed by early 2014. The Royal Bank of Canada committed to occupying four floors of the building, including the ground level, in order to house their Atlantic Canada regional headquarters and flagship downtown branch, both relocated from their current premises on George Street. Royal Bank held a competition open to students and recent graduates of the adjacent Nova Scotia College of Art and Design seeking a "signature artwork" for the development.

RBC moved to the Waterside Centre from their old George Street location over a weekend in August 2014. An opening ceremony for the new building was held on 11 September 2014.

The building achieved LEED Gold certification in February 2016.
