= Veith House =

Coordinates: 44°39′53″N 63°35′44″W

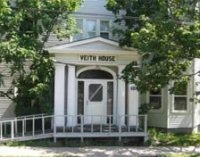
- The former Halifax Protestant Children's Orphanage still stands today as it was rebuilt two years following the Halifax Explosion
- Interactive map of Veith House
- Country: Canada
- Province: Nova Scotia
- Municipality: Halifax Regional Municipality
- Planning area: Halifax Peninsula
- Established: 1857
- Demolished by the Halifax Explosion: 1917
- Rebuilt: 1919
- Time zone: UTC-4
- Postal code: B3K 3G9
- Present at the time of the explosion: One staff and twenty children
- Number of survivors: Six

Veith House is an organization whose mission is to meet the needs of children, individuals and families, with empowerment as an ever-present goal. It is located at 3115 Veith St in the North End of the Halifax Regional Municipality, Nova Scotia, Canada. It is just down the hill from one of Halifax's landmarks, The Hydrostone.

== History ==
Veith House's history dates back to the 1800s. The Halifax Protestant Orphanage (also known as the Protestant Orphan's Home) was in existence from 1857 to 1969. The orphanage was founded by Reverend Robert Fitzgerald Uniacke (rector of St. George Church) in 1857 and was previously located on North Park Street. This became home to a countless number of children, both girls and boys. Among those who worked there as staff during the 1890s was matron Lucy Anne Rogers Butler, an educator and social worker who had spent her early 30s documenting her 1870s travel experiences with her sea captain husband.

The orphanage was relocated to Veith Street where it was destroyed in the Halifax Explosion in 1917, claiming the lives of both children and staff. Of the 21 people present in the building at the time of the explosion, only six survived. At this site, a monument has been erected commemorating the lives of the children and staff members lost in the disaster.

== Post-explosion ==
Post-explosion, the orphanage was rebuilt, but by 1969 the orphanage closed its doors. The property was then transferred to the Halifax Children's Foundation, to be used as the Veith House Community Centre and is still running today.
