= Alderney Landing =

Cultural centre in Dartmouth, Nova Scotia, Canada

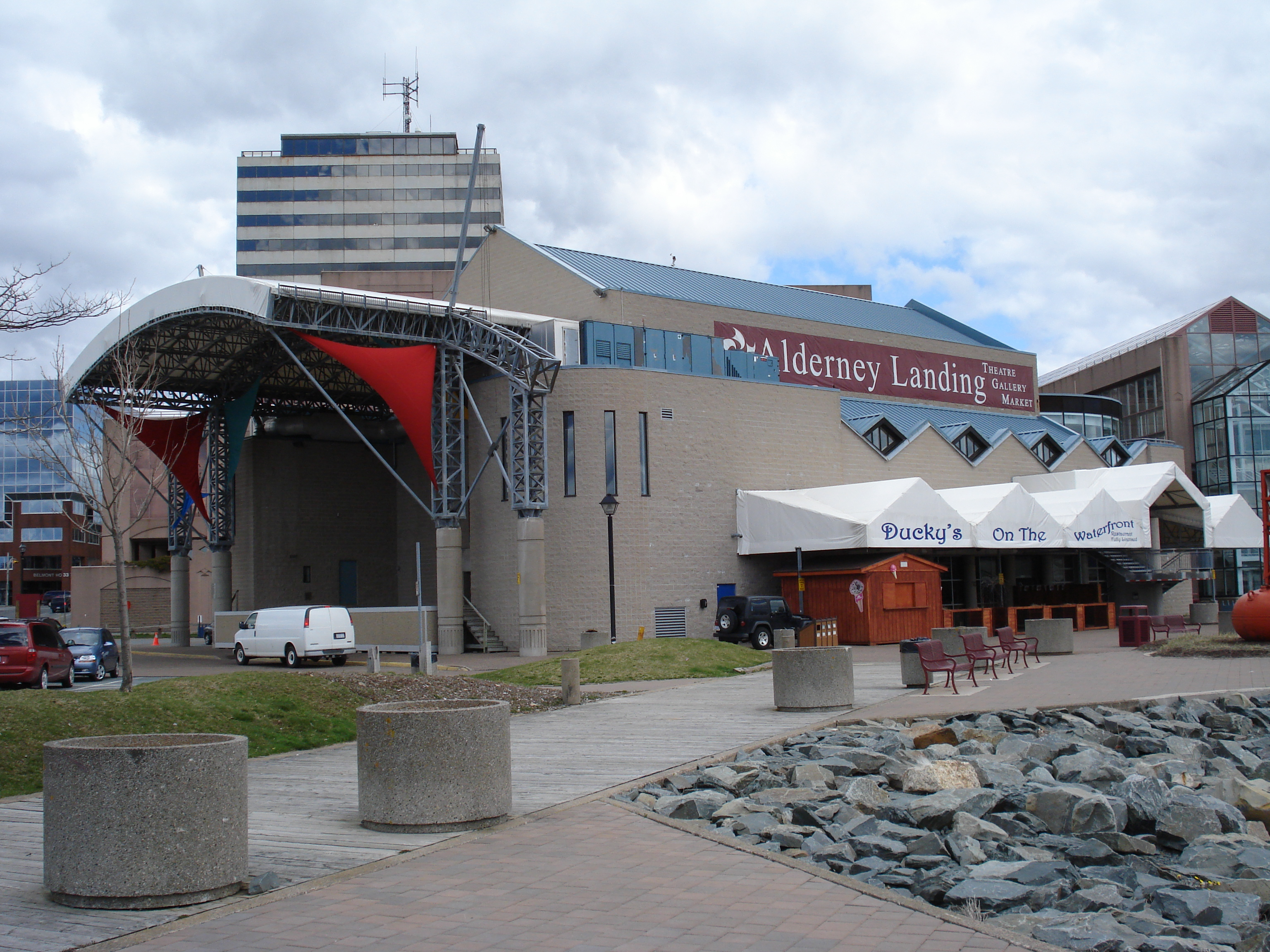
- Alderney Landing, with the outdoor stage shown
- Interactive map of Alderney Landing
- Address: 2 Ochterloney Street; Dartmouth, Nova Scotia, B2Y 3Z3; Canada
- Location: Downtown Dartmouth
- Coordinates: 44°39′52.7″N 63°34′10.1″W
- Seating type: Sitting and standing room
- Capacity: 285 (Theatre); 8,000

Construction
- Opened: May 1999

Website
- http://alderneylanding.com

Alderney Landing is a convention centre, art gallery, market, events plaza and theatre facility in Downtown Dartmouth, Nova Scotia. It was opened in May 1999. The theatre hosts many concerts, conventions and other events, and is the home of Halifax Theatre for Young People, San Family Productions, Coastal Dance, Maritime Marionettes.

The market on the lower level of Alderney Landing is home to a weekly farmers market, the Craig Art Gallery, Evan's Seafood Restaurant, the Casaroma Wellness Centre, Meadowvale Meat Market, a Noggin's Corner outlet and a Nova Scotia Liquor Corporation retail store.

The parking lot on the north side of the building bordering the harbour doubles as a large outdoor multi-use space called the Events Plaza, which can be used for outdoor concerts or festivals. There is a large stage build on one side of Alderney Landing facing the events plaza, with a permanent roof, used for outdoor concerts which can accommodate up to 8,000 people. There are also washrooms and electrical facilities on the opposite end of the plaza.

Alderney Landing hosts various outdoor events each year including; Canada Day Concert, Natal Day Events, Mother Goose Festival, Bluenose Ghosts Festival, and the Christkindlmarket.

When the complex was constructed it was integrated via a pedway into Alderney Gate, an existing building housing municipal government offices and the Dartmouth Regional Library (now a branch of the Halifax Public Libraries) completed in 1990, and the Halifax Transit ferry terminal built in 1979.
