= Royal Centre (Halifax, Nova Scotia) =

Coordinates: 44.6492°N 63.5731°W

Royal Centre in Halifax, Nova Scotia, Canada, is a 13-storey office tower in the heart of Halifax's financial district.

== Description ==
The Royal Centre was built in 1960 and was the regional head office of the Royal Bank of Canada (until it moved to the RBC Waterside Centre in 2014), located on 5161 George Street between Granville and Hollis Streets across from the Provincial Legislature Building.

This building does not violate the bylaw banning the construction of any building visible from inside Citadel Hill (Fort George).

== See also ==
- Halifax Regional Municipality
- Downtown Halifax
- Halifax
