= Loyola Residence Tower =

Building on the campus of St. Mary's University in Halifax, Nova Scotia

Coordinates: 44°37′50.00″N 63°34′49.00″W

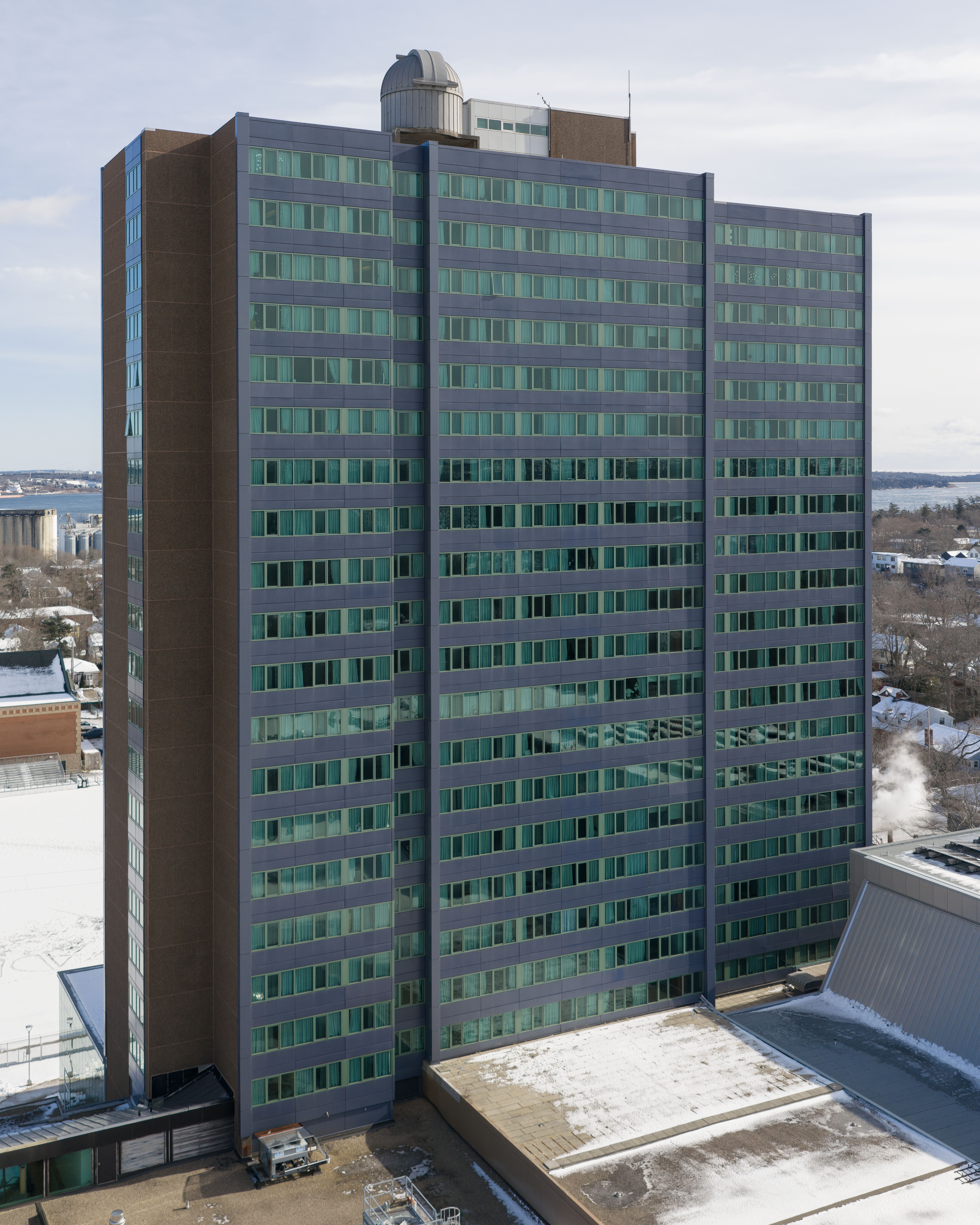
Loyola Residence Building in 2026

The Loyola Residence Tower (also known as the Ignatius Loyola Residence) in Halifax, Canada is a residence of Saint Mary's University completed in 1971. It is located on the main campus with a height of 67 metres accommodating up to 434 students on 22 floors.

It is notable as the home of the Burke-Gaffney Observatory, part of the university's Department of Astronomy and Physics. This is a fully-roboticized observatory with a 0.6 m telescope and a low resolution spectrograph for remote access use. The building also houses the St. Mary's University Art Gallery, which is situated on the ground floor.

In early 2023, the south-facing concrete façade of the tower was replaced with solar panels in order to reduce the university's carbon footprint. Retrofitted at a cost of C$8.5 million, the installation is expected to generate around 100,000 kWh yearly, and makes the Loyola Residence the tallest solar-integrated building in North America.

== See also ==
- List of astronomical observatories
