= List of communities in the Cape Breton Regional Municipality =

The Cape Breton Regional Municipality is a single municipality. This is a list of unincorporated areas within it, some of which are former municipalities, and some of which correspond to census areas. Estimated populations from the 2001 census are in parentheses. CBRM 2001 population was 109,330.

- Albert Bridge (974)
- Alder Point (576)
- Baleine
- Balls Creek (427)
- Barachois Harbour
- Barrachois (55)
- Bateston (100)
- Beaver Cove (52)
- Beechmont (105)
- Ben Eoin (106)
- Benacadie (51)
- Big Beach (27)
- Big Pond Centre (32)
- Big Pond (47)
- Big Ridge (81)
- Birch Grove (334)
- Black Brook (28)
- Blacketts Lake (270)
- Boisdale (105)
- Bras d'Or (543)
- Bridgeport
- Broughton (24)
- Caribou Marsh (258)
- Castle Bay (21)
- Catalone (62)
- Catalone Gut (48)
- Christmas Island (53)
- Coxheath (2,404)
- Dalem Lake (78)
- Dominion (2,142)
- Donkin (658)
- Dutch Brook (214)
- East Bay (210)
- Edwardsville (281)
- Enon (28)
- Eskasoni
- Florence (1,684)
- French Road (53)
- Frenchvale (251)
- Gabarus (51)
- Gabarus Lake (45)
- Gardiner Mines (613)
- Georges River (711)
- Gillis Lake (19)
- Glace Bay (16,984)
- Grand Lake Road (2,337)
- Grand Mira North (71)
- Grand Mira South (65)
- Grand Narrows (15)
- Groves Point (271)
- Hillside Boularderie (223)
- Homeville (43)
- Hornes Road
- Howie Centre (2,500)
- Huntington (72)
- Irish Cove (10)
- Irishvale (18)
- Ironville (35)
- Island View (22)
- Juniper Mountain (45)
- Leitches Creek (193)
- Leitches Creek Station
- Lingan (587)
- Lingan Road (440)
- Little Bras d'Or (503)
- Little Lorraine (62)
- Little Pond (273)
- Long Island Main(71)
- Louisbourg (1,157)
- McAdams Lake (32)
- Main-a-Dieu (240)
- Marion Bridge (617)
- Middle Cape (13)
- Mill Creek (496)
- Millville Boularderie (691)
- Mira Gut (133)
- Mira Road (1,578)
- New Aberdeen
- New Victoria (1,093)
- New Waterford (6,944)
- North Sydney (6,775)
- North West Arm (103)
- Northside East Bay (327)
- Pipers Cove (13)
- Point Aconi (176)
- Point Edward (396)
- Portage (215)
- Port Caledonia (251)
- Port Morien (647)
- Prime Brook (561)
- Reserve Mines (1,948)
- River Ryan (1,122)
- Rock Elm (15)
- Round Island (18)
- Salem Road
- Salmon River Road
- Sandfield (102)
- Scotch Lake (187)
- Scotchtown (1,082)
- Shunacadie (34)
- South Bar (673)
- South Side of Boularderie (128)
- St. Andrew's Channel (12)
- Sydney (24,115)
- Sydney Forks (736)
- Sydney Mines (7,312)
- Sydney River (3,150)Trout Brook
- Upper Grand Mira (10)
- Upper Leitches Creek (149)
- Upper North Sydney (313)
- Victoria Mines (389)
- Westmount (2,829)
