= Cape Breton Regional Council =

Governing body in Nova Scotia, Canada

Cape Breton Regional Council is the governing body for the Cape Breton Regional Municipality in the Canadian province of Nova Scotia.

== Members ==
Elected in the 2024 municipal elections

Councillor	District	Communities
Cecil Clarke	Mayor	All
Gordon MacDonald	1	Sydney Mines, Florence, Little Pond, Alder Point
Earlene MacMullin	2	North Sydney, Little Bras d'Or, Bras d'Or, Groves Point, Mill Creek, Point Aconi, Millville, Groves Point, Hillside Boularderie, Dalem Lake, Southside Boularderie
Blue Marshall	3	Grand Narrows, Christmas Island, Big Beach, Shunacadie, Beaver Cove, Boisdale, Upper Leitches Creek, Ironville, Barrachois, Long Island, Scotch Lake, Georges River, Upper North Sydney, Leitches Creek, Point Edward, North West Arm, Balls Creek, Coxheath (west), Blacketts Lake, Beechmont, Gillis Lake, Frenchvale, Northside East Bay, MacAdams Lake, Island View, Eskasoni First Nation, Castle Bay, Benacadie, Pipers Cove
Steve Gillespie	4	Sydney River, Coxheath (east), Westmount, Edwardsville
Eldon MacDonald	5	Sydney: Northend, Downtown, Shipyard, Boulderwood and Area; Mira Road (east), Membertou First Nation
Glenn Paruch	6	Sydney: Ashby, Southend; Grand Lake Road (west)
Steve Parsons	7	Irish Cove, Middle Cape, Big Pond Centre, Big Pond, St. Andrew's Channel, Ben Eoin, East Bay, Portage, Sydney Forks, Howie Centre, Prime Brook, Mira Road (south), Dutch Brook, Caribou Marsh, Marion Bridge, Sandfield, Huntington, Rock Elm, Grand Mira North, Upper Grand Mira, Enon, Gabarus Lake, Gabarus, French Road, Grand Mira South, Big Ridge, Juniper Mountain
Steven MacNeil	8	Glace Bay (south), Louisbourg, Fortress of Louisbourg, Little Lorraine, Main-a-Dieu, Bateston, Catalone, Catalone Gut, Albert Bridge, Mira Gut, Round Island, South Head, Homeville, Broughton, Black Brook, Birch Grove, Tower Road, Port Caledonia, Donkin, Port Morien
Dave MacKeigan	9	Glace Bay (central), Reserve Mines (north)
Paul Nickituk	10	Glace Bay (north), Dominion, Reserve Mines (north), Gardiner Mines
Darren O'Quinn	11	New Waterford, New Victoria, Scotchtown, Lingan, River Ryan
Kim Sheppard	12	Sydney (north), Whitney Pier, South Bar, Victoria Mines, Lingan Road, Grand Lake Road (east)
