= Marconi Trail =

Scenic roadway in Nova Scotia, Canada

Route information
- Length: 63 km (39 mi)
- Component highways: Route 255

Major junctions
- South end: Trunk 22 in Louisbourg
- North end: Trunk 4 / Trunk 28 in Glace Bay

Location
- Country: Canada
- Province: Nova Scotia
- Counties: Cape Breton Regional Municipality

Highway system
- Provincial highways in Nova Scotia; 100-series

The Marconi Trail is a scenic roadway in the Canadian province of Nova Scotia.

Located in eastern Cape Breton Island, the route is entirely within the Cape Breton Regional Municipality and runs from Louisbourg to Glace Bay along the island's eastern coast.

The Glace Bay terminus is at the Marconi National Historic Site, which marks the location of the first radio transmission from North America to Europe, made by Guglielmo Marconi in 1902. The Marconi Trail measures approximately 63 km (39 mi) in length.

== Mira Gut Bridge ==
Macroni Trail crossed the Mira River along Mira Bay Drive at the community of Mira Gut along the 140-year-old Mira Gut Bridge. In 2017, the structure was demolished after it was deemed unsafe. A replacement bridge opened on schedule in 2022, ending a 20 km (12 mi) detour along Brickyard Road and Hornes Road (Route 255) that crossed the Mira River along Trunk 22 at Albert Bridge.

== Highways ==
=== Numbered ===
- Route 255

=== Named Roads ===
- Louisbourg Main-à-Dieu Road
- Main-à-Dieu Road
- Mira Bay Drive
- Long Beach Road
- Donkin Highway

== Communities ==
- Louisbourg
- Little Lorraine
- Main-à-Dieu
- Bateston
- Catalone Gut
- Mira Gut
- Round Island
- Homeville
- Black Brook
- Port Morien
- Donkin
- Port Caledonia
- Glace Bay
