= Nova Scotia Route 327 =

Highway in Nova Scotia, Canada

Route 327

Route information
- Maintained by Nova Scotia Department of Transportation and Infrastructure Renewal
- Length: 44 km (27 mi)

Major junctions
- South end: Gull Cove Road in Gabarus
- Hwy 125 in Prime Brook
- North end: Trunk 28 in Sydney

Location
- Country: Canada
- Province: Nova Scotia
- Counties: Cape Breton Regional Municipality

Highway system
- Provincial highways in Nova Scotia; 100-series
← Route 326	→ Route 328

Route 327 is a collector road in the Canadian province of Nova Scotia.

It is located in the Cape Breton Regional Municipality and connects Sydney at Trunk 4 with Gabarus.

In Sydney it runs on Alexandra Street. South of exit 7 on Highway 125 it is known as the Gabarus Highway.

== Communities ==
- Gabarus
- French Road
- Big Ridge South
- Big Ridge
- Marion Bridge
- Caribou Marsh
- Dutch Brook
- Prime Brook
- Membertou
- Sydney

== See also ==
- List of Nova Scotia provincial highways
