= Devils Hill Falls =

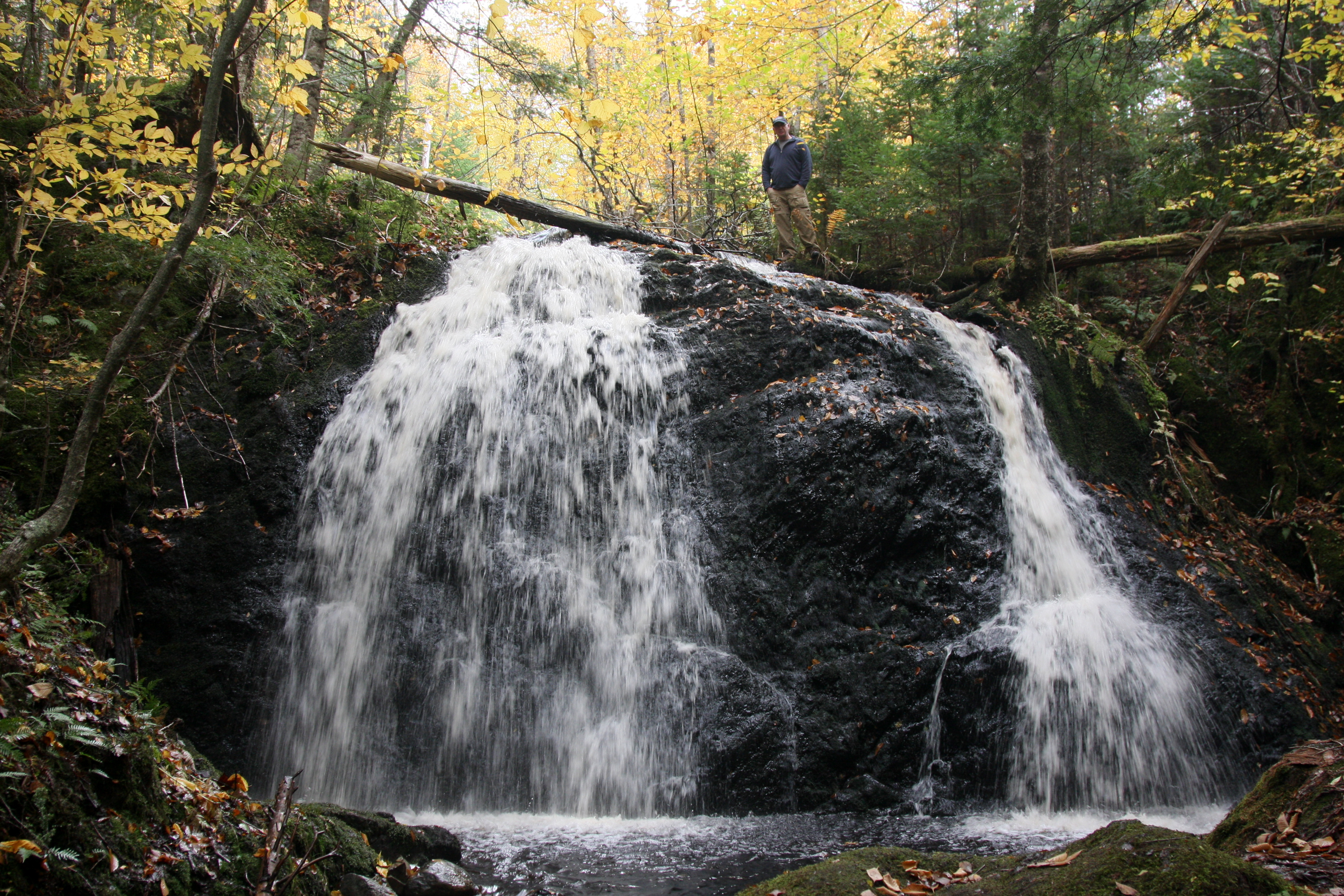
- Lower Devils Hill Falls, Cape Breton County, Nova Scotia
- Interactive map of Devils Hill Falls
- Location: Devils Hill, Nova Scotia, Canada
- Coordinates: 45°58′41.43″N 60°01′44.53″W
- Type: Upper & Lower classical ledge waterfalls connected by a cascade
- Total height: 12.5 metres (41 ft)
- Number of drops: 3
- Longest drop: 6 metres (20 ft)
- Watercourse: Devils Hill Brook

Devils Hill Falls is a waterfall on Devils Hill Brook, flowing off Devils Hill, sited approximately 5.5 kilometres (3.4 mi) south of the Mira River on Cape Breton Island, in the province of Nova Scotia, Canada. The waterfall is in three parts, an upper classical ledge waterfall, about 6 metres (20 ft) of fall, followed by a cascade leading to the lower falls, another classical ledge waterfall, about 4.5 metres (15 ft) in height. The waterfall is a short distance off of New Boston Road, about 3 kilometres (1.9 mi) from the community of Catalone. The falls are located on privately owned property.

== The Devils Hill Road Trail ==
The falls are a short hike, about a 230 metres (750 ft), in from New Boston Road to where the trail crosses the brook on a small bridge. The lower falls are just downstream of the bridge, the upper falls upstream, about 60 metres (200 ft) along a path running along the east side of the brook.

The Devils Hill Road trail is actually the old Devil’s Hill Road to Terra Nova. After visiting the falls it is worth a walk further to where the country opens up as the views are wonderful, especially in the fall. Devils Hill road continues 3.3 kilometres (2.1 mi) to meet the Terra Nova Road, and while the New Boston road end is no longer maintained by the province, it remains a provincially owned road so is open for the public's use. After about 2 kilometres (1.2 mi) the road will improve from a trail to a maintained road with a few scattered homes before meeting the Terra Nova Road.

Local tradition explains the name Devil's Hill, and the Devil's Hill Road that runs along the side of the hill, were named so because a gentleman met the Devil on his way home from Mira Ferry, or possibly New Boston, one night after a dance in the late 19th century.

There were quite a few farms along the road that went to the Mira, a few of them owned by German families and Gael families from Scotland. Many long gone now, returned to forest.

== Geocache ==
There is a small traditional geocache at the falls, located so it is accessible year round, which has been in place since February 2005.

== Gallery ==
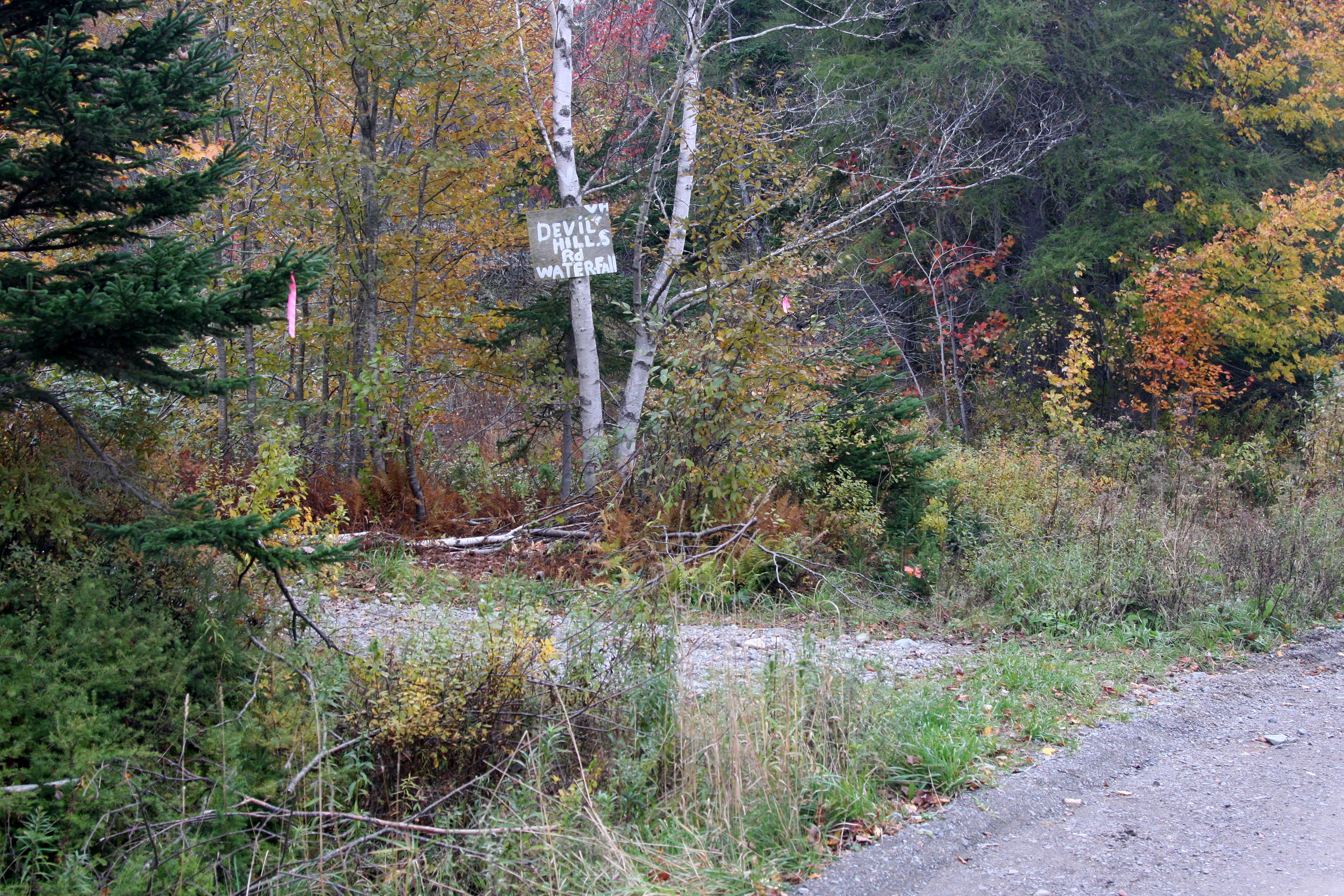
The Trail Head of Devils Hill Road, on the New Boston Road.

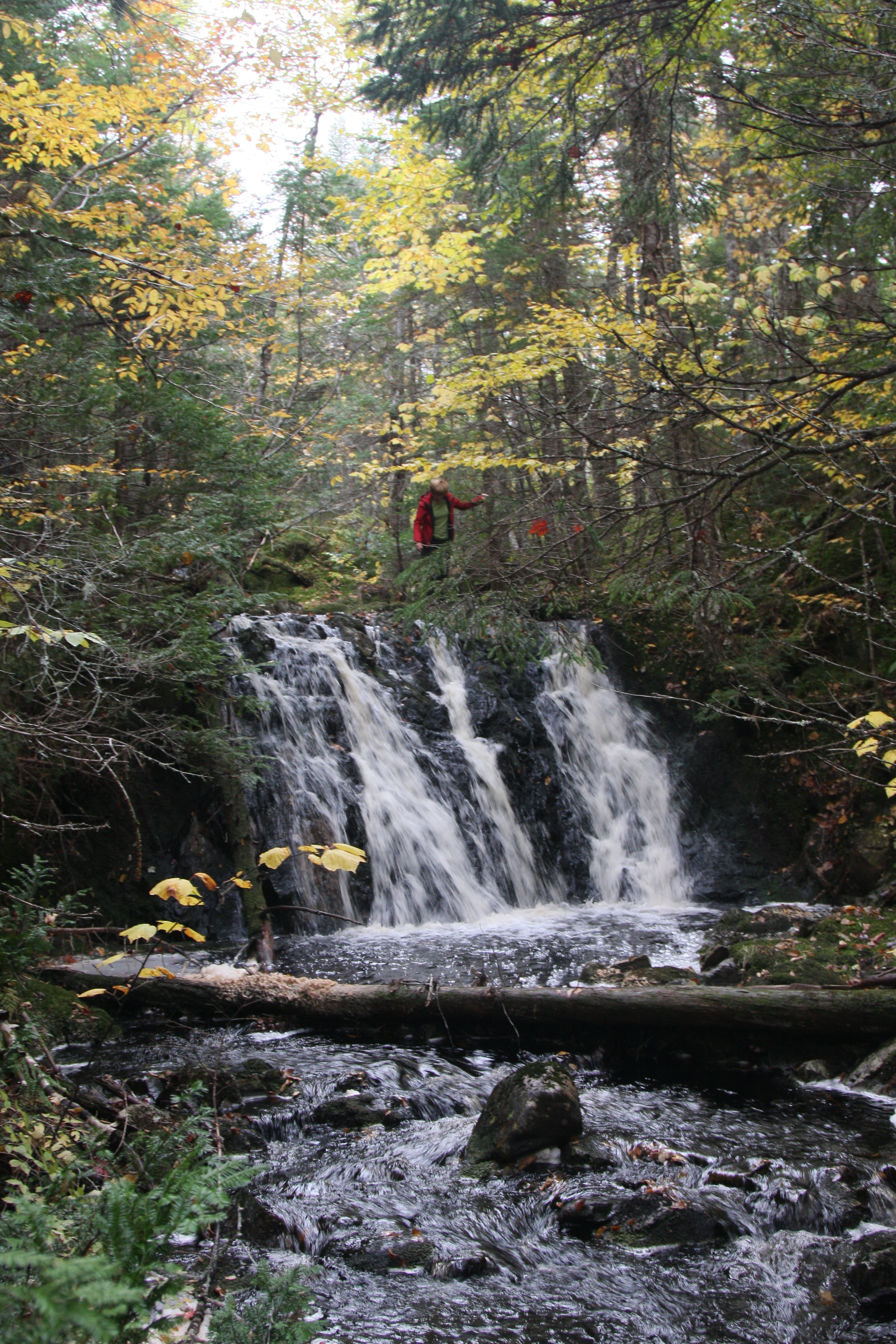
Upper Falls

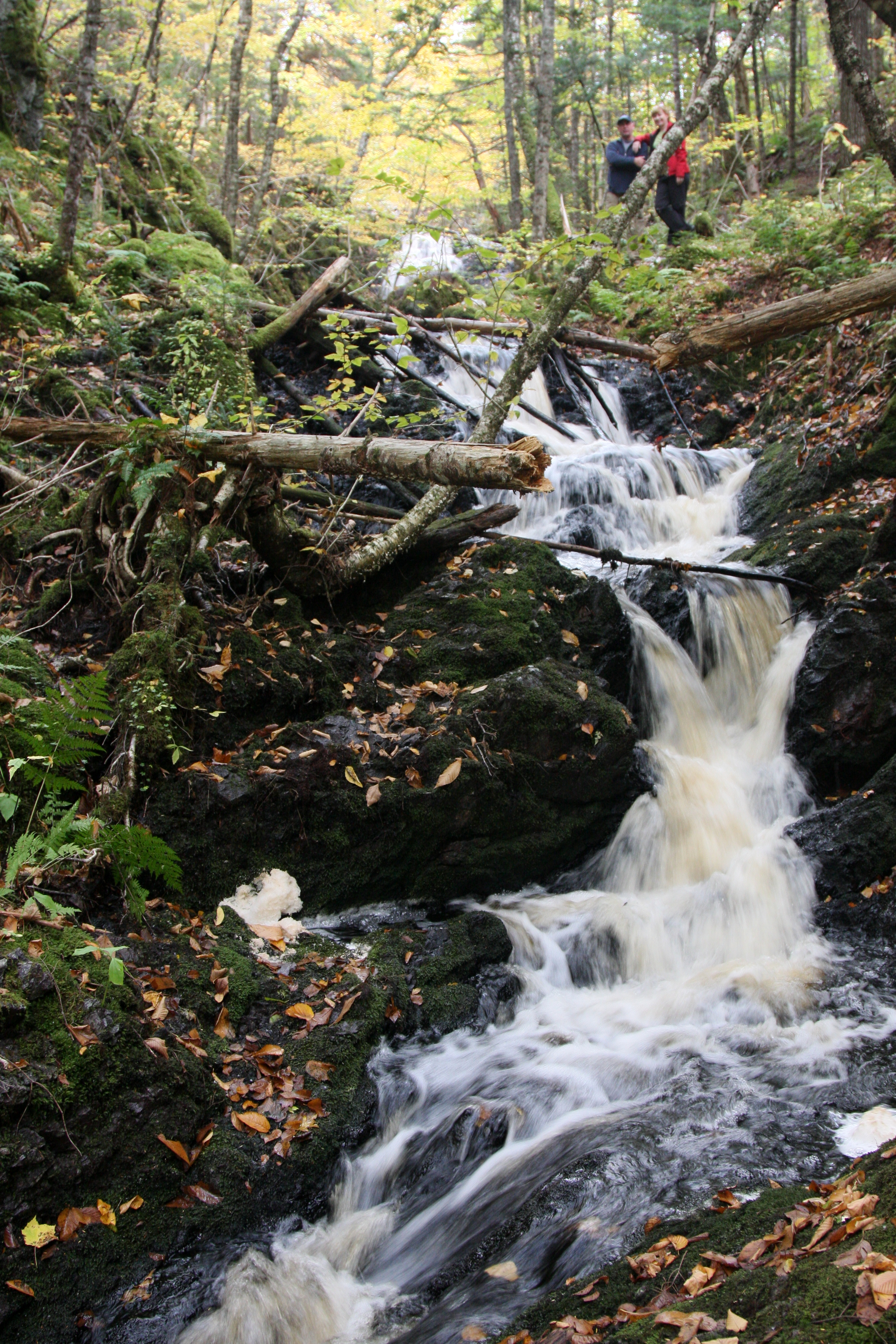
The cascade and flume between upper and lower falls.

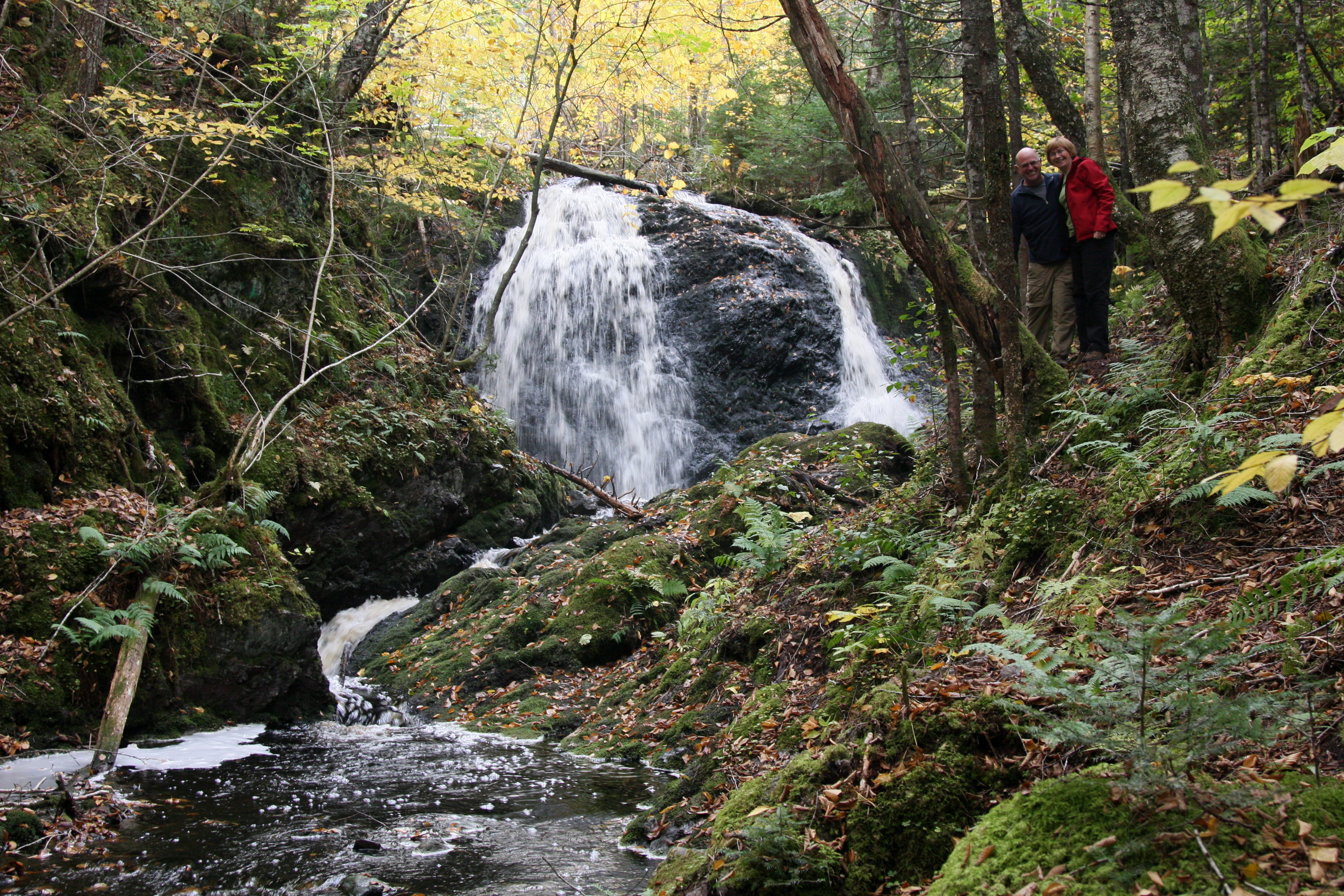
Lower Falls

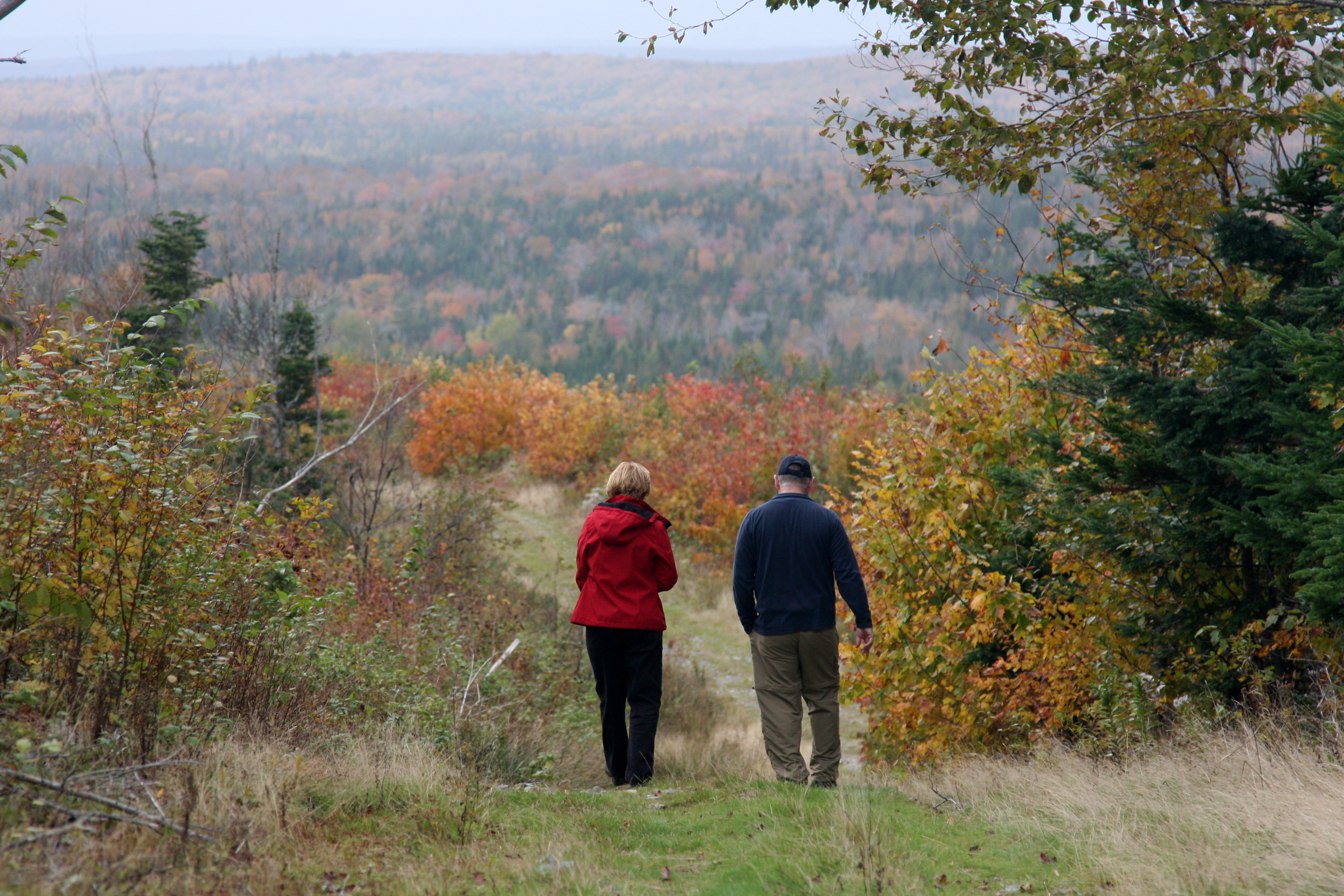
Along the Devils Hill Road.

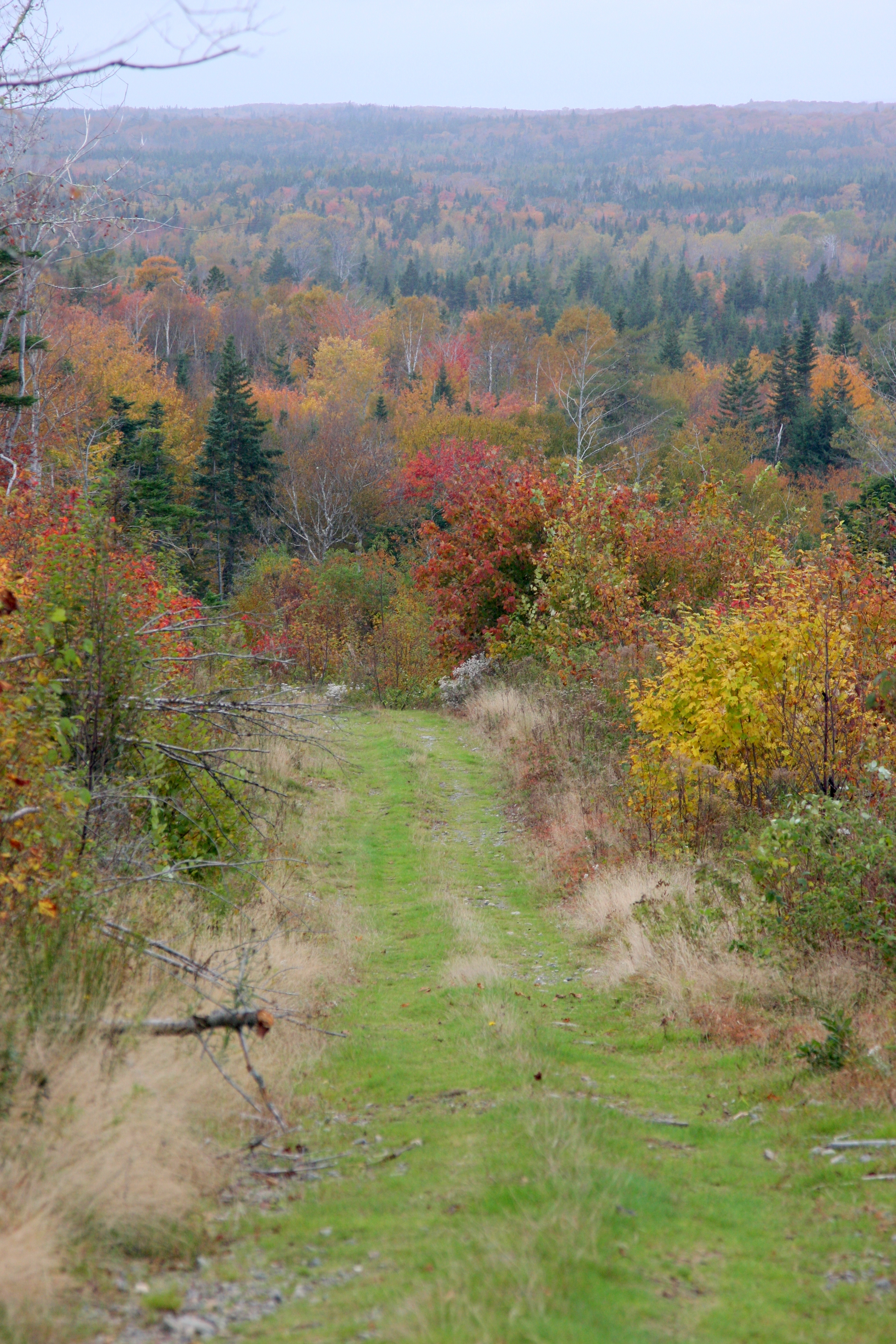
Along the Devils Hill Road.

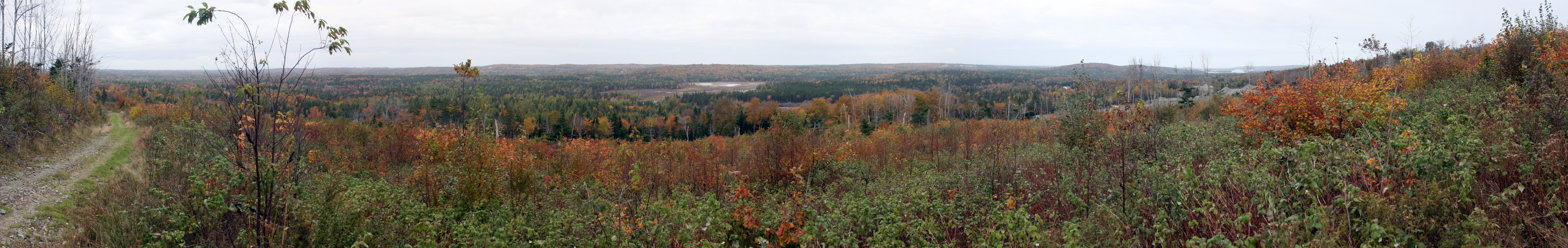
Along the Devils Hill Road, looking West by Northwest up the road left, MacPhersons Meadows in the distance centre, with Catalone Lake off to East (far right) in the distance.

== See also ==
- List of waterfalls
- List of waterfalls in Canada
- List of waterfalls in Nova Scotia
