= Trout Brook, Nova Scotia =

Community in Nova Scotia, Canada

Coordinates: 46°14′40.88″N 60°9′30.19″W

Trout Brook in Nova Scotia

Trout Brook is a community in the Canadian province of Nova Scotia, located in the Cape Breton Regional Municipality on Cape Breton Island.

== Parks ==
- Trout Brook Provincial Park
