= Long Island Main =

Community in Nova Scotia, Canada

Coordinates: 46°12′4.39″N 60°22′42.44″W

Long Island Main in Nova Scotia

Long Island Main is a community in the Canadian province of Nova Scotia, located in the Cape Breton Regional Municipality on Cape Breton Island.
