= Salem Road =

Community in Nova Scotia, Canada

Coordinates: 45°48′44.24″N 60°34′12.11″W

Salem Road in Nova Scotia

Salem Road is a community in the Canadian province of Nova Scotia, located in the Cape Breton Regional Municipality on Cape Breton Island.
