= Tracy Dares =

Canadian musician

- Also known as: Tracey Dares MacNeil
- Born: Cape Breton, Nova Scotia, Canada
- Occupation: Pianist
- Instrument: Piano

Tracey Dares MacNeil is a pianist from Cape Breton, Nova Scotia. She performed in Natalie MacMaster's band for several years, including recording for MacMaster's mid-1990s albums My Roots are Showing, No Boundaries and Fit as a Fiddle.

She is married to piper Paul K. MacNeil, and with him established the Castlebay Music online retail business specialising in Atlantic Canada music artists. The pair performed together on the CD Còmhla Cruinn – Gathered Together,

== Discography ==
- 1994: Crooked Lake
- 2000: Castlebaymusic.com with Paul MacNeil
