= Barachois Harbour =

Community in Nova Scotia, Canada

Coordinates: 46°10′2.88″N 60°24′35.53″W

Barachois Harbour in Nova Scotia

Barachois Harbour (/ˈbærəʃwɑː/ BARR-ə-shwah) is a community in the Canadian province of Nova Scotia, located in the Cape Breton Regional Municipality on Cape Breton Island.

== Point of interest ==
This community is home to Barachois Provincial Park. This picnic park was once a farm, but it is situated on a knoll under a canopy of trees providing a secluded and shaded picnicking experience. Nearby fishing opportunities are available on the Bras d'Or Lakes. A short trail leads from the park down to a marshy lagoon.
