= Salmon River Road, Nova Scotia =

Community in Nova Scotia, Canada

Coordinates: 45°53′52.42″N 60°20′7.95″W

Salmon River Road in Nova Scotia

Salmon River Road is a community in the Canadian province of Nova Scotia, located in the Cape Breton Regional Municipality on Cape Breton Island.
