= Shunacadie =

Community in Nova Scotia, Canada

Coordinates: 46°1′12.12″N 60°38′58.23″W

Shunacadie in Nova Scotia

Shunacadie (Mi'kmawi'simk: Su'ne'katik, meaning "at the cranberry place"; Scottish Gaelic: An Acarsaid, meaning "the harbour") is a community in the Canadian province of Nova Scotia, located in the Cape Breton Regional Municipality on Cape Breton Island.
