= Juniper Mountain =

Community in Nova Scotia, Canada

Coordinates: 45°57′33.78″N 60°15′0.81″W

Juniper Mountain in Nova Scotia

Juniper Mountain is a community in the Canadian province of Nova Scotia, located in the Cape Breton Regional Municipality on Cape Breton Island.
