= Frenchvale =

Community in Nova Scotia, Canada

Coordinates: 46°6′19.35″N 60°23′10.87″W

Frenchvale in Nova Scotia

Frenchvale is a community in the Canadian province of Nova Scotia, located in the Cape Breton Regional Municipality on Cape Breton Island.
