= Upper Grand Mira =

Community in Nova Scotia, Canada

Coordinates: 45°48′15.81″N 60°17′48.28″W

Upper Grand Mira in Nova Scotia

Upper Grand Mira is a community in the Canadian province of Nova Scotia, located in the Cape Breton Regional Municipality on Cape Breton Island.
