= Rock Elm, Nova Scotia =

Community in Nova Scotia, Canada

Coordinates: 45°55′43.35″N 60°20′4.24″W

Rock Elm in Nova Scotia

Rock Elm is a community in the Canadian province of Nova Scotia, located in the Cape Breton Regional Municipality on Cape Breton Island.
