= Mira Road, Nova Scotia =

Community in Nova Scotia, Canada

Coordinates: 46°6′13.4″N 60°9′14.8″W

Mira Road in Nova Scotia

Mira Road (2001 pop.: 1,578) is a community in the Canadian province of Nova Scotia, located in Cape Breton County.

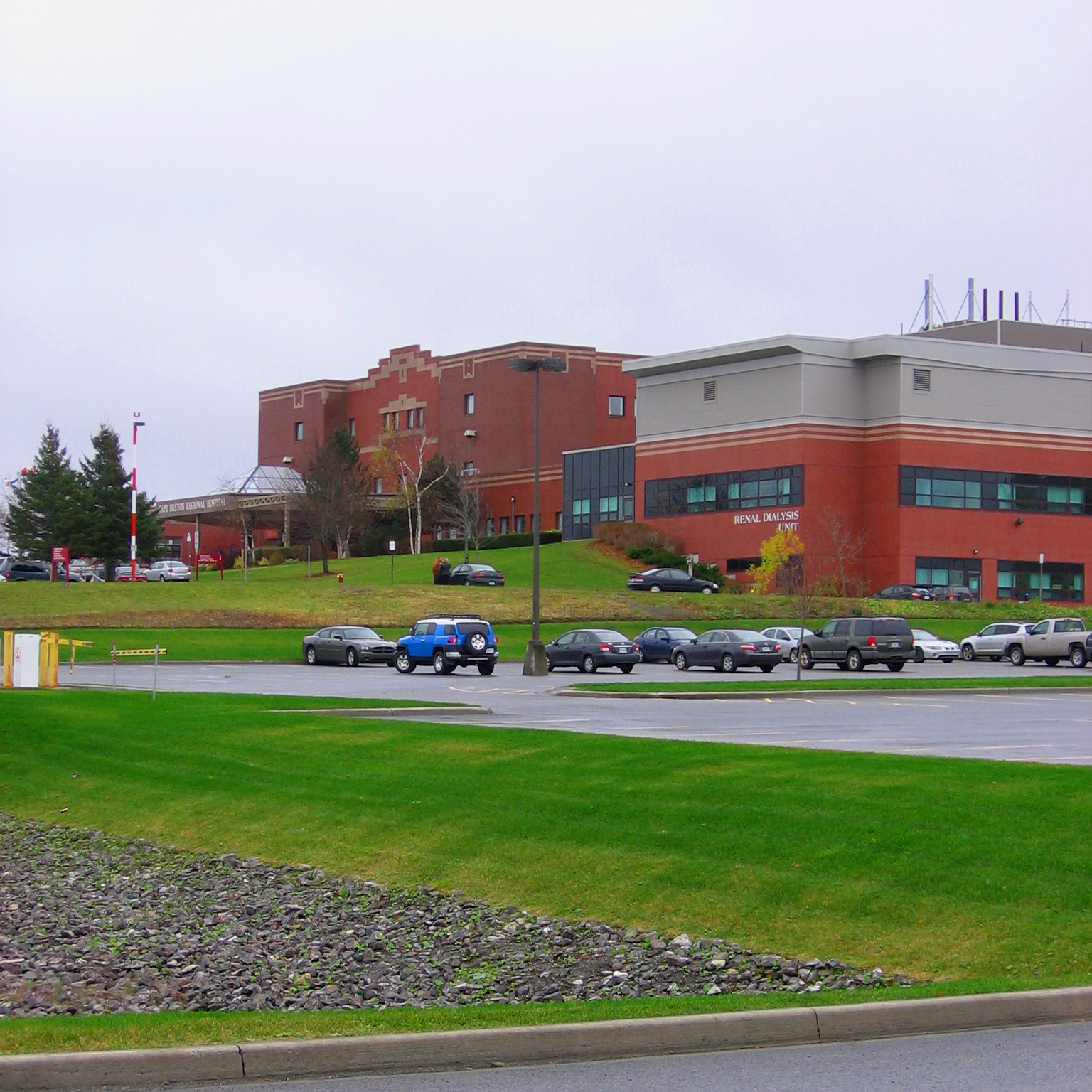
Cape Breton Regional Hospital is situated in the neighbourhood of Mira Road, Cape Breton Regional Municipality

Located immediately east of Sydney, and now joined with Sydney as part of Cape Breton Regional Municipality, Mira Road was originally built in the 18th century by French military forces from Fortress Louisbourg. It was used for commercial purposes to move goods between Louisbourg and Spanish Bay, which includes present-day Sydney Harbour. The "Grande Chemin de Mire" was reported to be wide enough for two carriages to pass, a notable achievement in colonial France. After French military forces were defeated and expelled from the area, Britain moved to consolidate it with the colony of Nova Scotia.

Settlement in the outlying areas of Sydney only began after the American Revolution when New England Loyalists moved to southern Cape Breton Island as refugees. They populated the area along the Mira Road and began farming, eventually creating a community named "Mira Road". More recent housing developments in the 1970s saw much of the farmland subdivided into housing lots and the area became a bedroom community of the City of Sydney. The Cape Breton Regional Hospital was opened in the area in 1995, and with major expansions is the major referral centre for Cape Breton Island.
