= Huntington, Nova Scotia =

Community in Nova Scotia, Canada

Coordinates: 45°56′15.15″N 60°17′58.17″W

Huntington in Nova Scotia

Huntington is a community in the Canadian province of Nova Scotia, located in the Cape Breton Regional Municipality on Cape Breton Island.
