= Upper Leitches Creek =

Community in Nova Scotia, Canada

Coordinates: 46°8′9.44″N 60°22′56.04″W

Upper Leitches Creek in Nova Scotia

Upper Leitches Creek is a community in the Canadian province of Nova Scotia, located in Cape Breton Regional Municipality on Cape Breton Island.
