= Birch Grove, Nova Scotia =

Community in Nova Scotia, Canada

Coordinates: 46°7′20.18″N 59°57′24.06″W

Birch Grove in Nova Scotia

Birch Grove is a community in the Canadian province of Nova Scotia, located in the Cape Breton Regional Municipality on Cape Breton Island.
