= Benacadie =

Community in Nova Scotia, Canada

Coordinates: 45°56′44.8″N 60°43′29.53″W

Benacadie in Nova Scotia

Benacadie (/bəˈnækədi/) is a community in the Canadian province of Nova Scotia, located in the Cape Breton Regional Municipality. Its name is of Mi'kmaq origin.
