= Gardiner Mines =

Community in Nova Scotia, Canada

Coordinates: 46°12′32.19″N 60°2′49.89″W

Gardiner Mines in Nova Scotia

Gardiner Mines is a community in the Canadian province of Nova Scotia, located in the Cape Breton Regional Municipality on Cape Breton Island.
