= Enon, Nova Scotia =

Community in Nova Scotia, Canada

Coordinates: 45°48′9.78″N 60°32′36.94″W

Enon in Nova Scotia

Enon is a community in the Canadian province of Nova Scotia, located in the Cape Breton Regional Municipality on Cape Breton Island.
