= Groves Point =

Community in Nova Scotia, Canada

- Unincorporated community
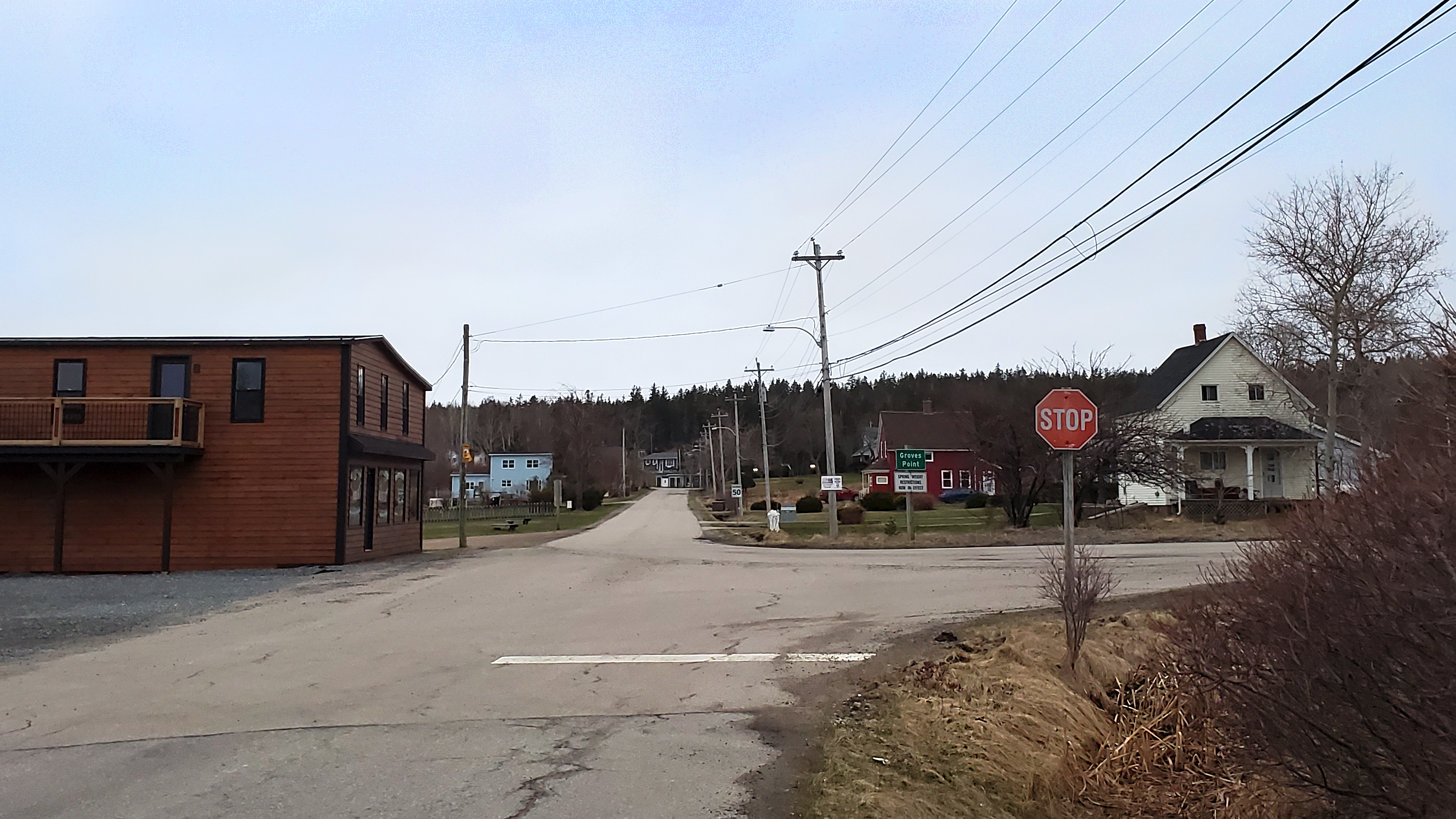
- Groves Point

- Location within Nova Scotia Location within Canada
- Coordinates: 46°13′55″N 60°20′08″W
- Country: Canada
- Province: Nova Scotia
- County: Cape Breton
- Municipality: Cape Breton Regional Municipality

Population (2021)
  - Total: 254
- Time zone: UTC– 04:00 (AST)
  - Summer (DST): UTC– 03:00 (ADT)
- GNBC Code: CAOUO

Groves Point is an unincorporated community in Cape Breton Regional Municipality, Cape Breton County, Nova Scotia, Canada.

Groves Point Provincial Park is a nearby day-use park with a beach on Bras d'Or Lake.

== Demographics ==
In the 2021 Census of Population conducted by Statistics Canada, Groves Point had a population of 254 living in 118 of its 135 total private dwellings, a change of −1.6% from its 2016 population of 258. With a land area of 7.63 km^{2} (2.95 sq mi), it had a population density of 33.3/km^{2} (86.2/sq mi) in 2021.
