= Sandfield, Nova Scotia =

Community in Nova Scotia, Canada

Coordinates: 45°57′39.15″N 60°16′10.33″W

Sandfield in Nova Scotia

Sandfield is a community in the Canadian province of Nova Scotia, located in the Cape Breton Regional Municipality on Cape Breton Island.
