= Howie Centre =

Community in Nova Scotia, Canada

Coordinates: 46°04′45″N 60°15′44″W

Howie Centre in Nova Scotia

Howie Centre is a community in the Canadian province of Nova Scotia, located in the Cape Breton Regional Municipality on Cape Breton Island. The community has a school, Mountainview Elementary, which is a complex with East Bay Elementary.
