= Gabarus Lake, Nova Scotia =

Community in Nova Scotia, Canada

Coordinates: 45°48′38″N 60°14′12″W

Gabarus Lake in Nova Scotia

Gabarus Lake is a community in the Canadian province of Nova Scotia, located in the Cape Breton Regional Municipality.
