= Donkin, Nova Scotia =

Community in Nova Scotia, Canada

Coordinates: 46°10′53.91″N 59°52′22.18″W

Donkin in Nova Scotia

Donkin is a Canadian rural village with a population of 532 as of 2021. Located on the picturesque coastline of Nova Scotia's Cape Breton Island, it is a part of the Cape Breton Regional Municipality. The smaller communities of Port Caledonia and Schooner Pond are directly adjacent to the village proper, connected by a single strip of road called the Donkin Highway.

== Geography ==
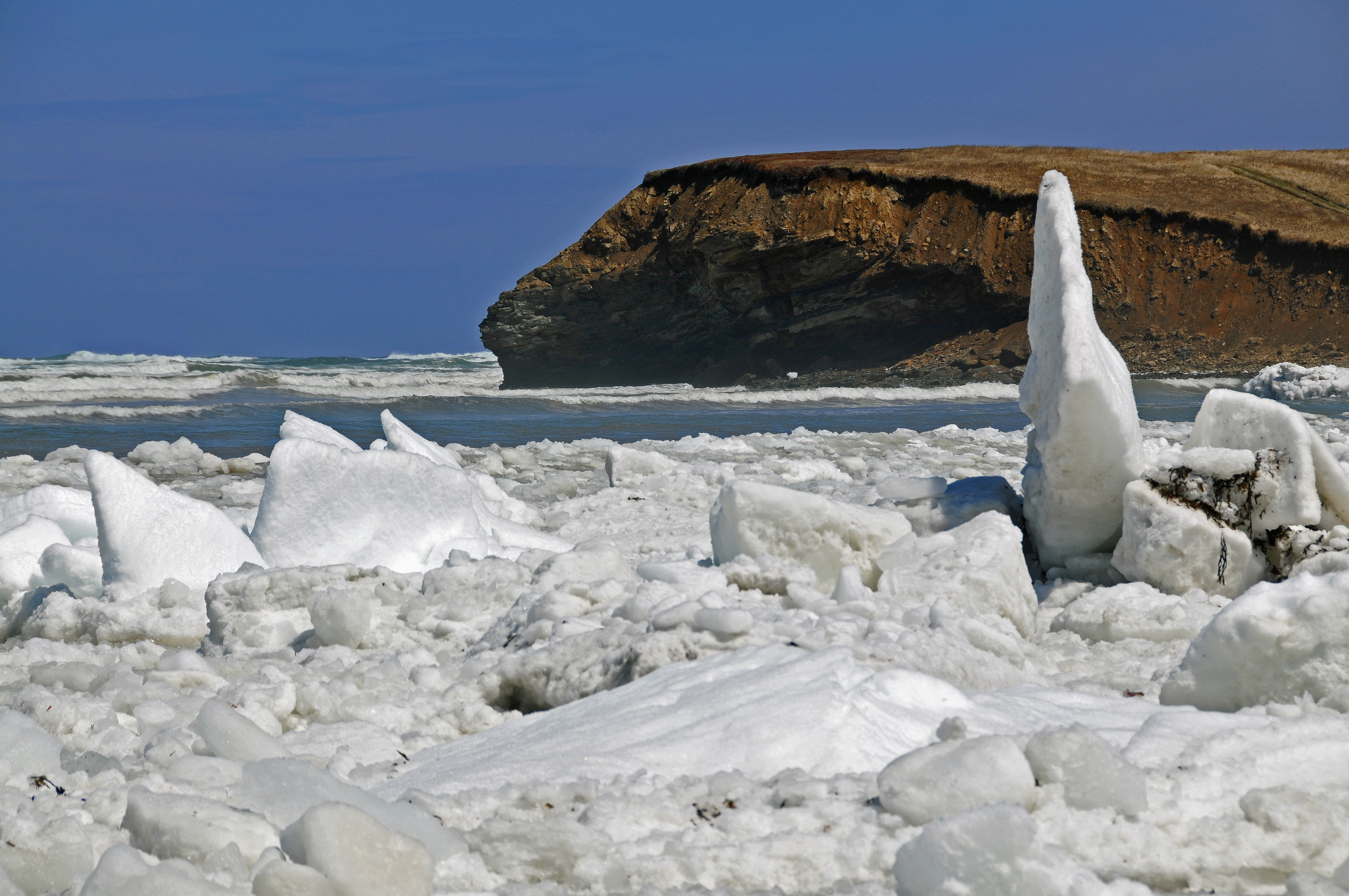
Donkin in April 2008

As part of the Cape Breton Regional Municipality, Donkin is located 11 km east of the town of Glace Bay and 32 km east from the city of Sydney. The nearest village is Port Morien which is 10 km away.

Donkin sits on the northeasternmost tip of Cape Breton, along the Marconi Trail which stretches from Glace Bay to Louisbourg.

== Name ==
The community of Donkin was once known only as Dominion No. 6, named after the Dominion Coal Company colliery that operated from 1904 to 1934. In an effort to correct errors in postal delivery (another community named Dominion is located nearby), the community was given its own name. In 1940, at a community meeting, the village was named Donkin, in honour of Hiram Donkin, who was the second general manager of the Dominion Coal Company and later became the Deputy Minister of Mines for Nova Scotia.

== History ==
At the turn of the twentieth century, most families were settled in Schooner Pond. When the Dominion No. 6 colliery opened in 1904, people from a wide variety of ethnic backgrounds came from all over the globe in search of work.

The area saw active development with the construction of numerous mining buildings, homes and businesses. Businesses included a barbershop, post office, shoemaker, blacksmith, dry goods store, hardware store, a credit union and a farming goods store. Later, there was also a pool hall, taxi and movie theatre. The S&L Railway provided daily transportation through 5 miles of the community.

=== Coal mining ===
Historically a coal mining area, Donkin has a colliery developed by the Cape Breton Development Corporation (DEVCO). One of the first mining operations in the area was in Schooner Pond in 1863, when the Acadia Mines opened and began production from the Emery coal seam. The coal was exported by ship until trains began to take coal to the docks at Sydney in 1874. In 1863, the Clyde Mine opened in the area now known as Port Caledonia. All mining operations in the area ceased after the miners' strike of 1925.

After the mines closed, workers traveled to the Phalen and Lingan mines to continue working.

During the early 1980s, there was a push to develop the coal deposits extending out under the Atlantic Ocean from large adits initiated on the coast. Large scale tunnel burrowing machines were used to provide access to these high quality coal fields. Numerous consultants worked on this job, including Golder Associates, which provided geotechnical consulting services regarding support and stability of the sub-oceanic mine from its offices in Mississauga, Ontario. The Devco mine operated for a few years before closing in the mid-1990s. Donkin miners continued to do this work into the 1990s, until all DEVCO mines ceased operations in 2001.

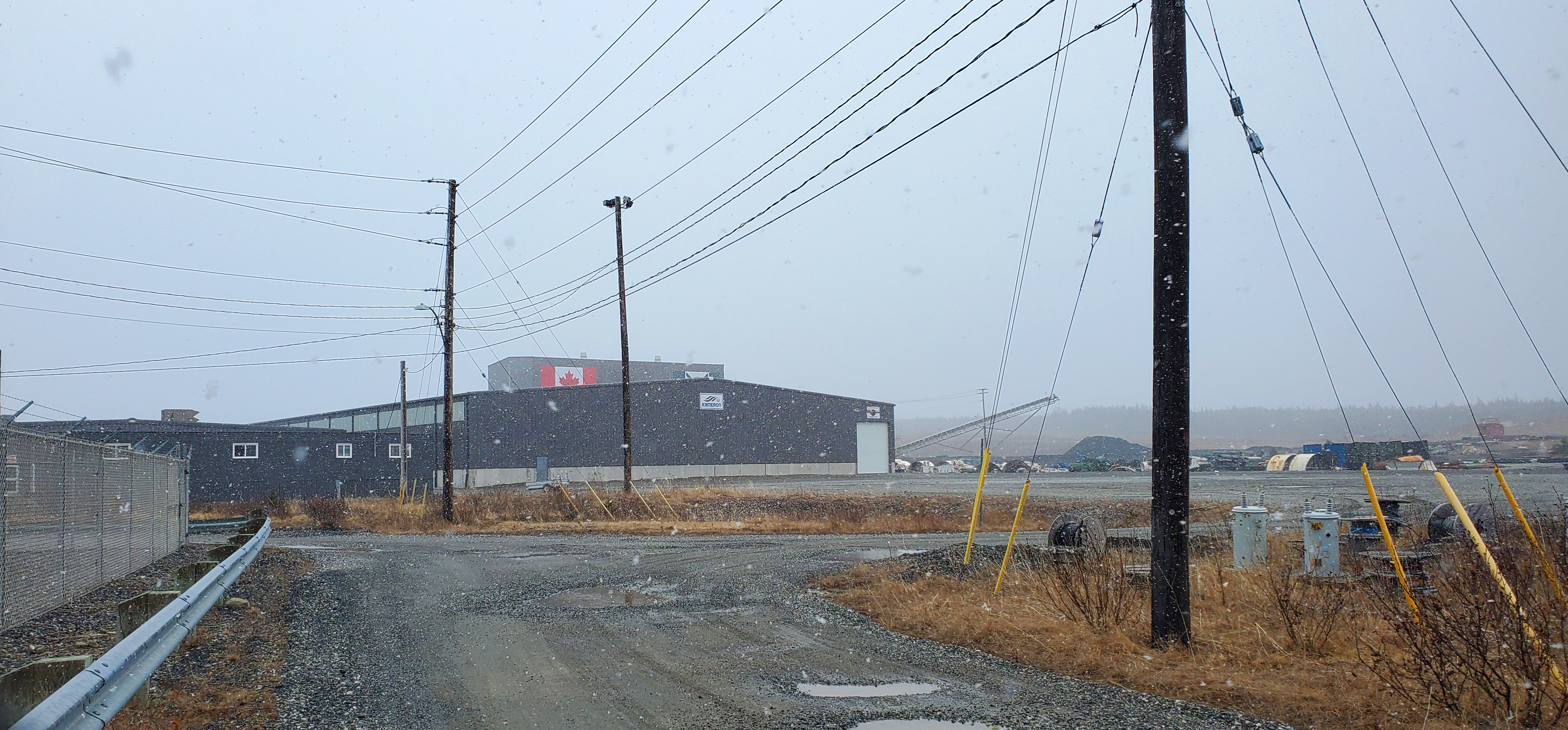
The Donkin Coal Mine, shut down in 2020

In 2006, the Swiss mining consortium Xstrata, the primary partner in the Donkin Coal Development Alliance, won the rights to develop the abandoned mine site. In December 2010, Stephen Harper announced that the dredging of Sydney harbour would help allow Panamax sized vessels to enter the new deepwater port. Nothing came of this development, however, and the mine was sold to the Cline Group in 2014. Kameron Coal Management Limited, a subsidiary of Cline Group, began operations in March 2017 with plans to mine a half-million tonnes in the first year, but initial testing found the conditions and geological formations to be more complex than anticipated. In November 2017, the company announced that some lay-offs were necessary, new machinery was needed and a new mining plan would have to be approved by the government. Production at the mine ended on March 30, 2020. Subsequently, residents complained of noise from the closed mine coming from fans in the mine's ventilation system that lacked silencers.

== Demographics ==
In the 2021 Census of Population conducted by Statistics Canada, Donkin had a population of 532 living in 246 of its 272 total private dwellings, a change of 1.5% from its 2016 population of 524. With a land area of 9.5 km^{2} (3.7 sq mi), it had a population density of 56.0/km^{2} (145.0/sq mi) in 2021.

== Economy ==
In June 2015, the Cline Group, an American company that acquired the mine in 2014, began hiring workers as part of its efforts to reopen the mine. Unfortunately, it was announced on 30 March 2020 that due to ongoing trouble with rockfall, the mine was going to be closed and everyone was laid off.
