= McAdams Lake, Nova Scotia =

Community in Nova Scotia, Canada

Coordinates: 46°2′26.98″N 60°27′4.47″W

MacAdams Lake in Nova Scotia

MacAdams Lake is a community in the Canadian province of Nova Scotia, located in the Cape Breton Regional Municipality on Cape Breton Island.
