= Beaver Cove, Nova Scotia =

Community in Nova Scotia, Canada

Coordinates: 46°4′8.2″N 60°33′31.32″W

Beaver Cove in Nova Scotia

Beaver Cove (Scottish Gaelic: Camas an Dobhrain) is a community in the Canadian province of Nova Scotia, located in the Cape Breton Regional Municipality.
