= Grand Mira North =

Community in Nova Scotia, Canada

Coordinates: 45°51′57.12″N 60°18′34.01″W

Grand Mira North in Nova Scotia

Grand Mira North is a community in the Canadian province of Nova Scotia, located in the Cape Breton Regional Municipality on Cape Breton Island.
