= Pipers Cove =

Community in Nova Scotia, Canada

Coordinates: 45°56′41.8″N 60°48′0.2″W

Pipers Cove in Nova Scotia

Pipers Cove is a community in the Canadian province of Nova Scotia, located in the Cape Breton Regional Municipality on Cape Breton Island.
