= Gillis Lake =

Community in Nova Scotia, Canada

Coordinates: 46°3′28.75″N 60°26′48.4″W

Gillis Lake in Nova Scotia

Gillis Lake is a community in the Canadian province of Nova Scotia, located in the Cape Breton Regional Municipality on Cape Breton Island.
