= Homeville =

Community in Nova Scotia, Canada

Coordinates: 46°5′1.57″N 59°53′55.49″W

Homeville in Nova Scotia

Homeville is a community in the Canadian province of Nova Scotia, located in the Cape Breton Regional Municipality.
