= Dutch Brook =

Community in Nova Scotia, Canada

Coordinates: 46°4′1.34″N 60°12′5.92″W

Dutch Brook in Nova Scotia

Dutch Brook is a community in the Canadian province of Nova Scotia, located in the Cape Breton Regional Municipality on Cape Breton Island. The area was named Dutch Brook as early as 1859 on account of the German (Deutsch) settlers who lived there.
