= Prime Brook =

Community in Nova Scotia, Canada

Coordinates: 46°6′51.48″N 60°12′27.55″W

Prime Brook in Nova Scotia

Prime Brook is a community in the Canadian province of Nova Scotia, located in the Cape Breton Regional Municipality on Cape Breton Island.

== Demographics ==
In the 2021 Census of Population conducted by Statistics Canada, Prime Brook had a population of 186 living in 84 of its 92 total private dwellings, a change of 1.6% from its 2016 population of 183. With a land area of 6.77 km^{2} (2.61 sq mi), it had a population density of 27.5/km^{2} (71.2/sq mi) in 2021.
