= Caribou Marsh =

Community in Nova Scotia, Canada

Coordinates: 46°2′47.57″N 60°12′5.92″W

Caribou Marsh in Nova Scotia

Caribou Marsh is a community in the Canadian province of Nova Scotia, located in the Cape Breton Regional Municipality on Cape Breton Island.
