= French Road, Nova Scotia =

Community in Nova Scotia, Canada

Coordinates: 45°53′51.56″N 60°13′32.44″W

French Road in Nova Scotia

French Road is a community in the Canadian province of Nova Scotia, located in the Cape Breton Regional Municipality on Cape Breton Island.
