= Bateston =

Community in Canada

Coordinates: 46°0′19.11″N 59°54′53.89″W

Bateston in Nova Scotia

Bateston is a community in the Canadian province of Nova Scotia, located in the Cape Breton Regional Municipality on Cape Breton Island. It is known for its flashing light at the center of town.

Organizations operating in Bateston include the Bateston Athletic Pensioners and Seniors Club and the Bateston Fire Hall.
