= Round Island, Nova Scotia =

Community in Nova Scotia, Canada

Coordinates: 46°3′12.45″N 59°55′45.19″W

Round Island in Nova Scotia

Round Island is a community in the Canadian province of Nova Scotia, located in the Cape Breton Regional Municipality on Cape Breton Island.
