= Catalone =

Community in Nova Scotia, Canada

Coordinates: 45°50′14″N 60°8′15″W

Catalone in Nova Scotia

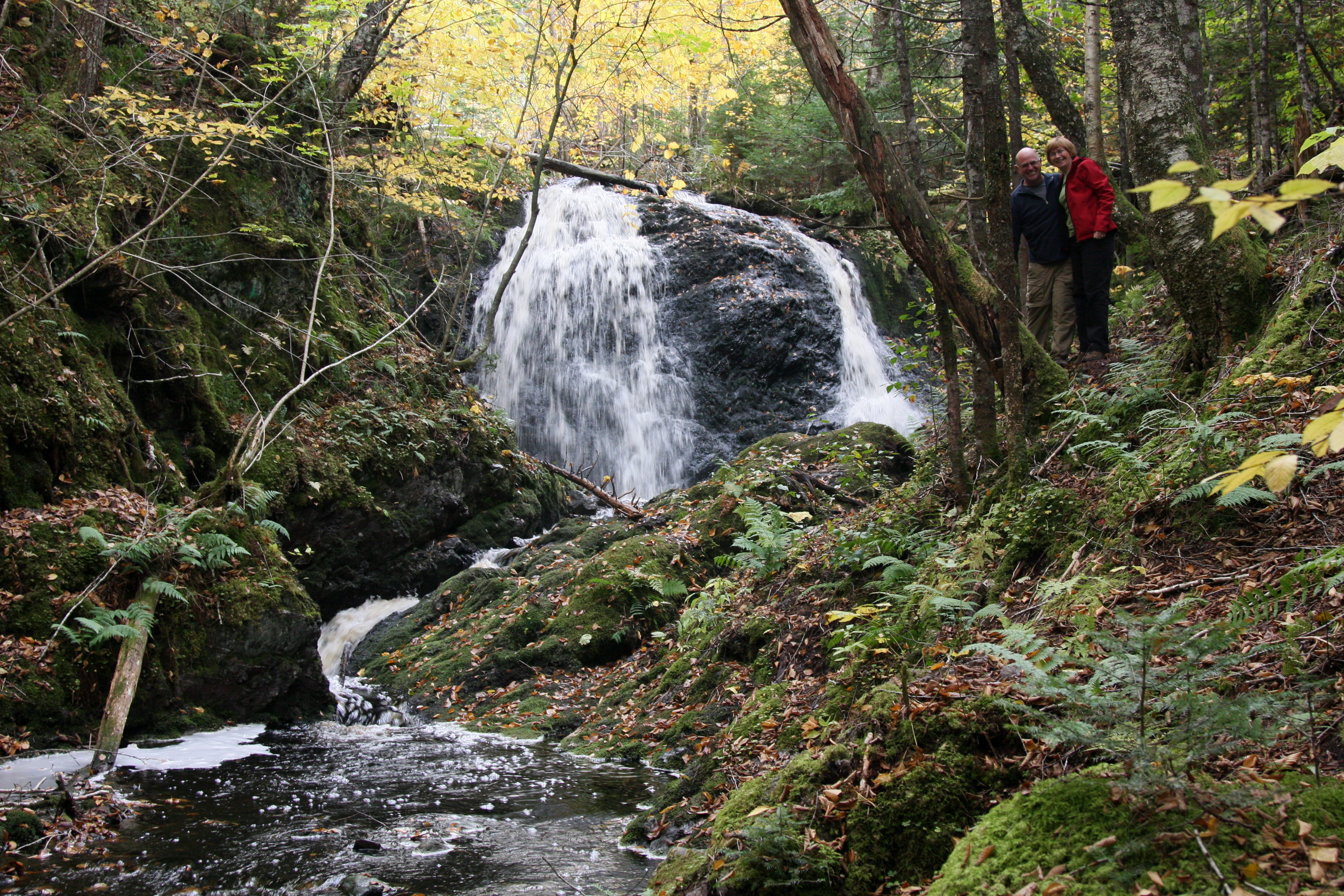
Devil's Hill Falls in Catalone, Nova Scotia

Catalone is a community in the Canadian province of Nova Scotia, located in the Cape Breton Regional Municipality on Cape Breton Island.

Many of the people who first inhabited Catalone came from the Scottish Hebridean islands, namely North Uist. Most came in the early part of the 19th century.

The community is named after Gédéon de Catalogne (1663- 1729), a famous French officer in the Troupes de marine, who was also a cartographer and a surveyor, and who was once stationed at the French Fortress of Louisbourg, after having led several other projects in what was at that time New France.
