= Catalone Gut =

Community in Nova Scotia, Canada

Coordinates: 46°0′43.15″N 59°57′18.19″W

Catalone Gut in Nova Scotia

Catalone Gut is a community in the Canadian province of Nova Scotia, located in the Cape Breton Regional Municipality on Cape Breton Island. It is named after Gédéon de Catalogne, a French officer, who was a cartographer stationed at the Fortress of Louisbourg.
