= Port Morien =

Community in Nova Scotia, Canada

Coordinates: 46°7′55.73″N 59°52′30.21″W

Port Morien in Nova Scotia

Port Morien (also referred to as "Morien") is a small fishing community in the Canadian province of Nova Scotia, located in the southeastern Cape Breton Island near the rural community Donkin, and six miles from the town of Glace Bay.

== Name ==
Port Morien was first recorded as "Baie de Mordienne" on a map in 1580. In the nineteenth century, it was renamed Cow Bay by settlers. A cow allegedly escaped from a vessel when being transported from Sydney to Louisbourg and was found in the area. In 1895, its name was changed to Port Morien.

== History ==
The history of Port Morien can be traced back to the early 18th century, when the area was first settled by French and Scottish immigrants. The town quickly developed into a thriving fishing and mining community, with a bustling port and a thriving economy.

In the late 20th century, Port Morien faced a number of economic challenges, as the fishing and mining industries declined and many residents left the area in search of work. However, the community has remained resilient and has worked to diversify its economy and attract new businesses and residents.

=== Coal mining ===
The presence of coal in Cape Breton was first noted by Intendant Jean Talon in 1671. It was the Treaty of Utrecht in 1713, and the subsequent founding of Louisbourg, which really focused French attention on Cape Breton coal as a valuable and necessary resource. The Fortress of Louisbourg and its inhabitants were in need of a local coal supply, and the closest source was the outcrop at Port Morien So, the first commercial coal mine in North America began production at Port Morien in 1720. By 1724, coal from Port Morien was being traded to Boston in the first officially recorded export of minerals in Canada. The ownership of the mine, called the Gowrie Mines, changed hands between the English and French four times, with the English ultimately gaining control in the late eighteenth century. In 1725, a blockhouse was built by the French to protect the valuable coal reserves.

=== Fishing ===
Alongside the mining industry, the fishing industry also grew. Over time, the village has become dependent on lobster fishing as its main resource. In 2000, the lobster fleet consisted of 47 boats. There has been a fish-processing plant operating at the harbour continuously by one family since 1941. There is also a boatbuilding business in town.

== Organizations and clubs ==
There are many active organizations and clubs in the Port Morien community. They include: a Royal Canadian Legion branch, a development association, a volunteer fire department, Girl Guides of Canada, a camera club, a community fair committee, a women's institute, an acting group, a wildlife association, a youth sports league, and a walking club. There are also three churches: St John's United Church, St. Mary's Roman Catholic Church, and St. Paul's Anglican Church.

Although there is currently no active group, Port Morien was the site of the first Boy Scout troop in North America, founded in 1908 by William Glover, the chief book keeper of the North Atlantic Colliery.

== Attractions ==
- The Marconi Wireless Station National Historic Site of Canada is located near Port Morien.

== Recognition ==
- In 2008, Port Morien received the Lieutenant Governor's Community Spirit Award.
