= Cape Breton Regional Municipality =

Cape Breton
- Regional municipality
- Cape Breton Regional Municipality
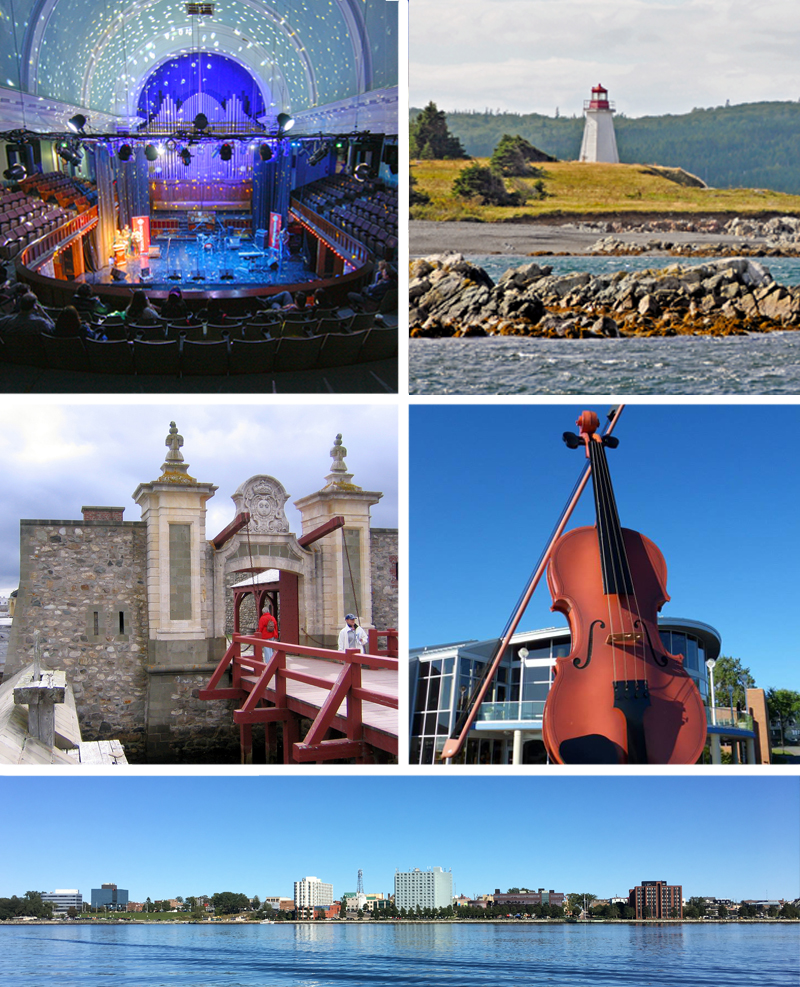
- From top, left to right: Highland Arts Theatre, Gabarus Light House, gate at Fortress of Louisbourg, Big Fiddle, Sydney waterfront

- Flag Coat of arms
- Nickname: A Community of Communities
- Motto: Fortuna Non Mutat Genus (Circumstances Do Not Change Our Origin)
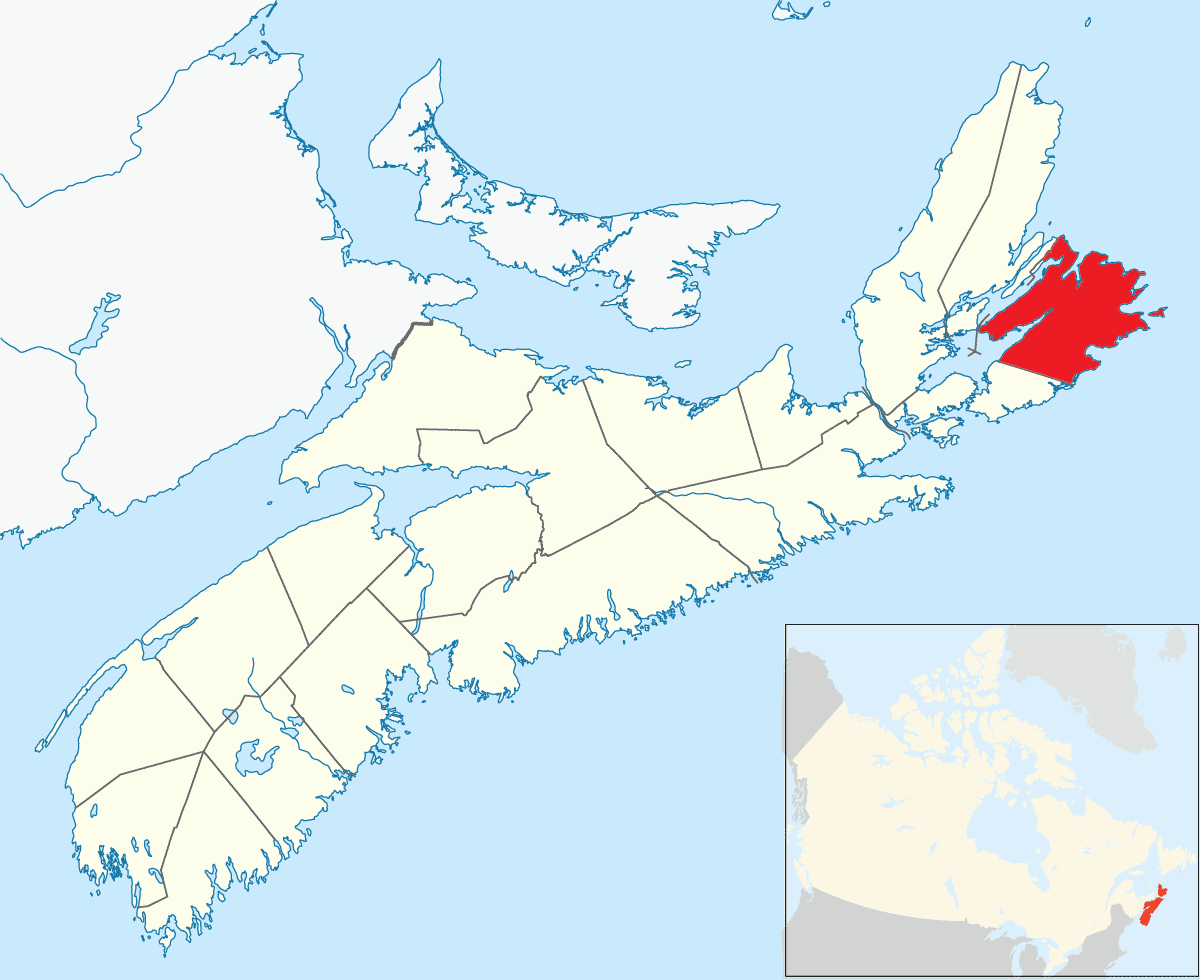
- Location of Cape Breton Regional Municipality
- Coordinates: 46°08′20″N 60°11′35″W
- Country: Canada
- Province: Nova Scotia
- County: Cape Breton
- Established: August 1, 1995
- Electoral Districts Federal: Cape Breton—Canso—Antigonish / Sydney—Glace Bay
- Provincial: Cape Breton Centre / Cape Breton-Richmond / Glace Bay / Northside-Westmount / Sydney River-Mira-Louisbourg / Sydney-Whitney Pier / Victoria-The Lakes

Government
  - Type: Cape Breton Regional Council
  - Mayor: Cecil Clarke
  - MPs: Mike Kelloway, Jaime Battiste
  - MLAs: Kendra Coombes, John White, Brian Comer, Derek Mombourquette, Keith Bain, Trevor Boudreau, Fred Tilley

Area (2021)
  - Land: 2,419.70 km^{2} (934.25 sq mi)
  - Urban: 30.91 km^{2} (11.93 sq mi)
- Elevation: 0 to 235 m (0 to 771 ft)

Population (2021)
  - Regional municipality: 93,694
  - Density: 38.7/km^{2} (100/sq mi)
  - Change 2016–21: ▼0.6%
  - Census ranking (2016): 58 of 5,162
- Demonym: Cape Bretoner
- Time zone: UTC−4 (AST)
  - Summer (DST): UTC−3 (ADT)
- Postal code: B1x, B2x
- Area code: 902
- Dwellings: 46,471
- Median household income (2020): C$ 62,400
- Coastline: Atlantic 800 km (500 mi); Bras d'Or Lakes 400 km (250 mi)
- Roadways: 1,600 km (1,000 mi)
- NTS Map: 11K1 Sydney
- GNBC Code: CBUCD
- Website: cbrm.ns.ca

Cape Breton Regional Municipality (often referred to as simply "CBRM") is the Canadian province of Nova Scotia's second largest municipality and the economic heart of Cape Breton Island. As of July 2024 the municipality has a population of 112,789.

Created in 1995 through the amalgamation of the eight municipalities of Cape Breton County, the region is home to a significant concentration of government services, social enterprises, and private sector companies, including the Canadian Coast Guard College, Cape Breton University, NSCC Waterfront campus, and New Dawn Enterprises. The rural areas of the municipality continue to host resource industries such as agriculture, fishing, mining, and forestry. CBRM is host to many cultural landmarks and institutions such as the historic Savoy Theatre, the Cape Breton Miners Museum, the Celtic Colours International Festival, the Cape Breton Centre for Craft, the Highland Arts Theatre, and the Holy Angels Arts & Cultural centre.

The area hosts one of Nova Scotia's premier tourism destinations, the Fortress of Louisbourg national park site, operated by Parks Canada as a living history museum. The site stands as the largest reconstruction project in North America. The Port of Sydney was projected to welcome a record 135,000 cruise ship visitors in 2017, a 67 percent increase from 2016. The Trans-Canada Highway terminates in North Sydney where Marine Atlantic ferries connect to both Channel-Port aux Basques, Newfoundland and Labrador, where the highway starts again, and Argentia.

== History ==
=== Early history ===
The glaciers began their retreat from the Maritimes approximately 13,500 years ago, with final deglaciation, post-glacial rebound, and sea level fluctuation ending and leaving the New England-Maritimes region virtually ice free 11,000 years ago. The earliest evidence of Paleo-Indian settlement in the region follows rapidly after deglaciation. Evidence of settlement found in the Debert Palaeo-Indian Site dates to 10,600 before the present. However, settlement seems likely to have occurred earlier, following large game animals such as the caribou as they expanded into the land revealed by the retreating glaciers. The record of continuous habitation through the paleo and archaic period over ten thousand years culminated in the development of the culture, traditions, and language of the First Nations people now known as the Mi'kmaq.

=== Mi'kmaq ===
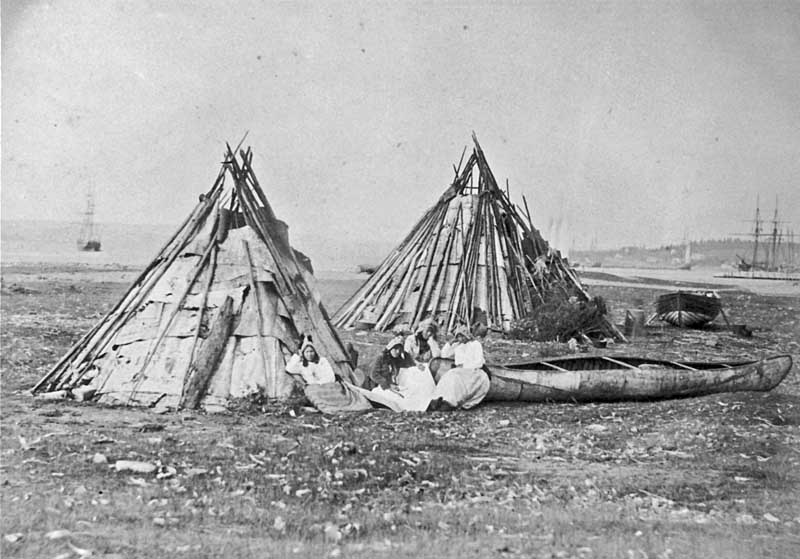
Mi'kmaq camp in Sydney, Cape Breton Island, Nova Scotia, photographed by Paul-Émile Miot in 1857.

The Palaeoindians inhabiting the area before European arrival lived a semi-nomad lifestyle, following the cycle of the seasons in search of food and resources, which required frequent moving from place to place. The area known as Cape Breton Island has been a part of the territory of the Mi'kmaq nation of Mi'kma'ki. Mi'kma'ki included what is now the Maritimes, parts of Maine, Newfoundland and the Gaspé Peninsula.

=== French settlement ===
The French were the first Europeans to claim the region, which was named Acadia. Control passed back and forth between the English and French throughout the late 17th and early 18th centuries. Under the Treaty of Utrecht of 1713, France retained control of "Île Royale". In 1719, France began construction on a fortified town located along the sheltered southwestern shore of Havre Louisbourg, naming the settlement Louisbourg.

The fortress was captured by British colonial forces, then returned by the British to France. It was captured again during the Seven Years' War which saw the inhabitants expelled and the fortress completely destroyed by British Army engineers in 1760.

=== Post-Acadian settlement ===
By proclamation of October 17, 1763, after termination of the Seven Years' War, Île Royale was renamed Cape Breton Island and was formally annexed to Nova Scotia. For a time thereafter Cape Breton Island was part of Halifax County. On December 10, 1765, Cape Breton Island was set apart as a separate county. In 1784, the island was made a separate colony with its capital at Sydney however by 1820 the colony was remerged into Nova Scotia.

=== Industrial activity ===
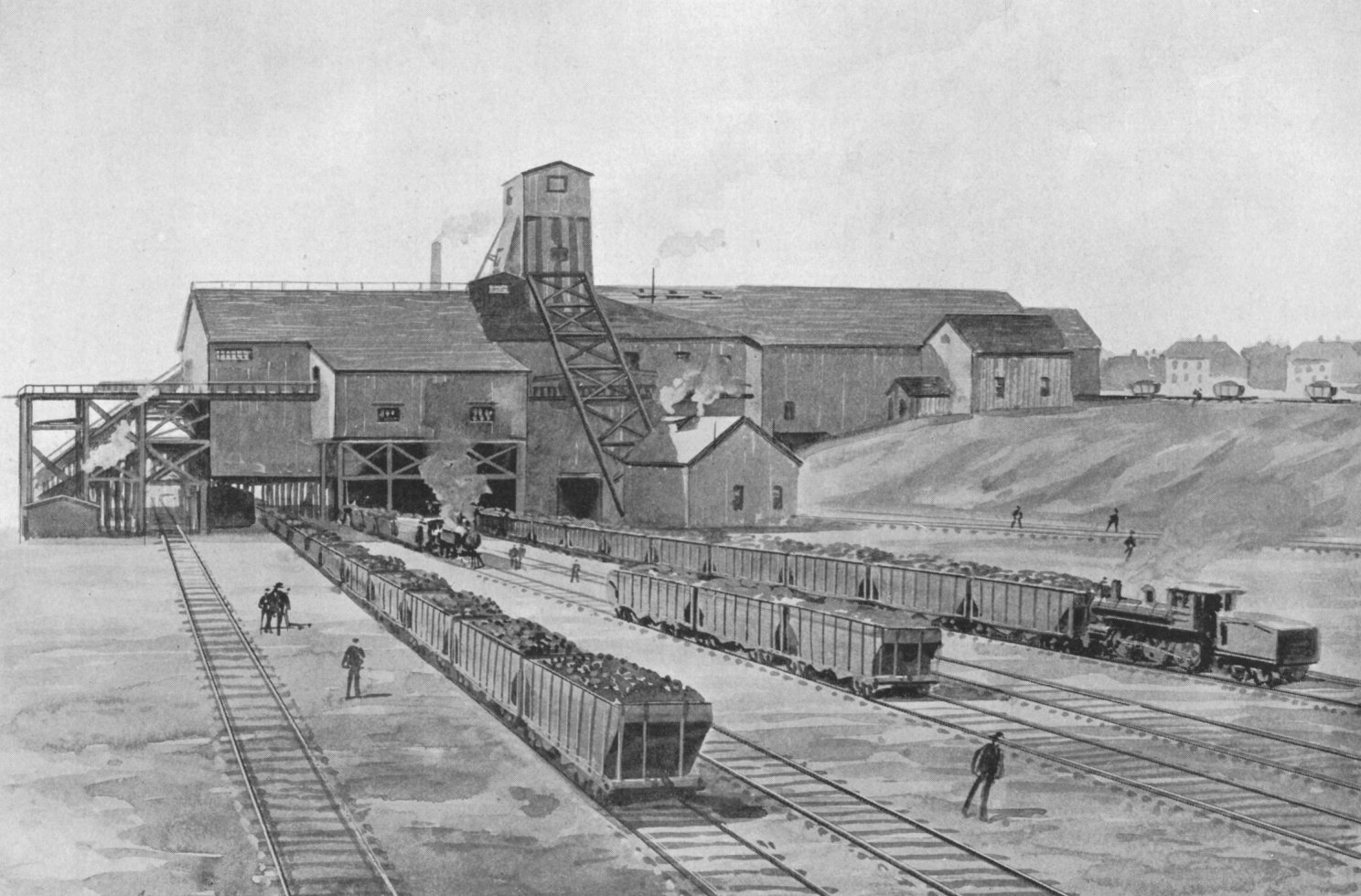
Reserve Colliery 1900

Coal mining began during the 18th century to supply Fortress Louisbourg. Industrial mining began in 1826 under the General Mining Association monopoly, followed in later years by independent American-owned mines south of Sydney Harbour. Large-scale mining commenced in 1893 under the auspices of the Dominion Coal Company (DOMCO) which merged these independent mines. Coal production under Dominion Steel and Coal Corporation (DOSCO) peaked in the early 1940s and in 1957 the company became a subsidiary of Hawker Siddeley Group. The company announced in 1965 that it would be exiting the coal mining business within months.

In response to a public outcry, the minority government of Prime Minister Lester B. Pearson announced J.R. Donald would head a Royal Commission of Inquiry into the Cape Breton coal industry, with hearings held in 1965 and 1966. The Donald Commission recommended that a federal Crown corporation be established to acquire and manage DOSCO's coal operations, with the aim being to slowly wean the area economy from its dependence on the coal industry.

On July 7, 1967, the Cape Breton Development Corporation (DEVCO), was established to operate the mines in the interim, while phasing them out throughout the 1970s and, at the same time, develop new economic opportunities for the surrounding communities. At the same time, the provincial government expropriated DOSCO's steel mill in Sydney, creating the Sydney Steel Corporation (SYSCO), while DEVCO would continue to operate the adjacent coke ovens. By 1992 the Lingan Colliery was closed followed by the Phalen Colliery in 1999 and the Prince Colliery in 2001. At the same time, the provincial government decided to dismantle and sell SYSCO.

DEVCO ceased to exist on December 31, 2009, with its remaining assets and staff turned over to Enterprise Cape Breton Corporation (ECBC), a federal government economic development initiative, in an attempt to diversify the CBRM economy. On June 19, 2014, the operations of ECBC were transferred to both the Atlantic Canada Opportunities Agency and the Public Works and Government Services Canada.

=== Amalgamation ===
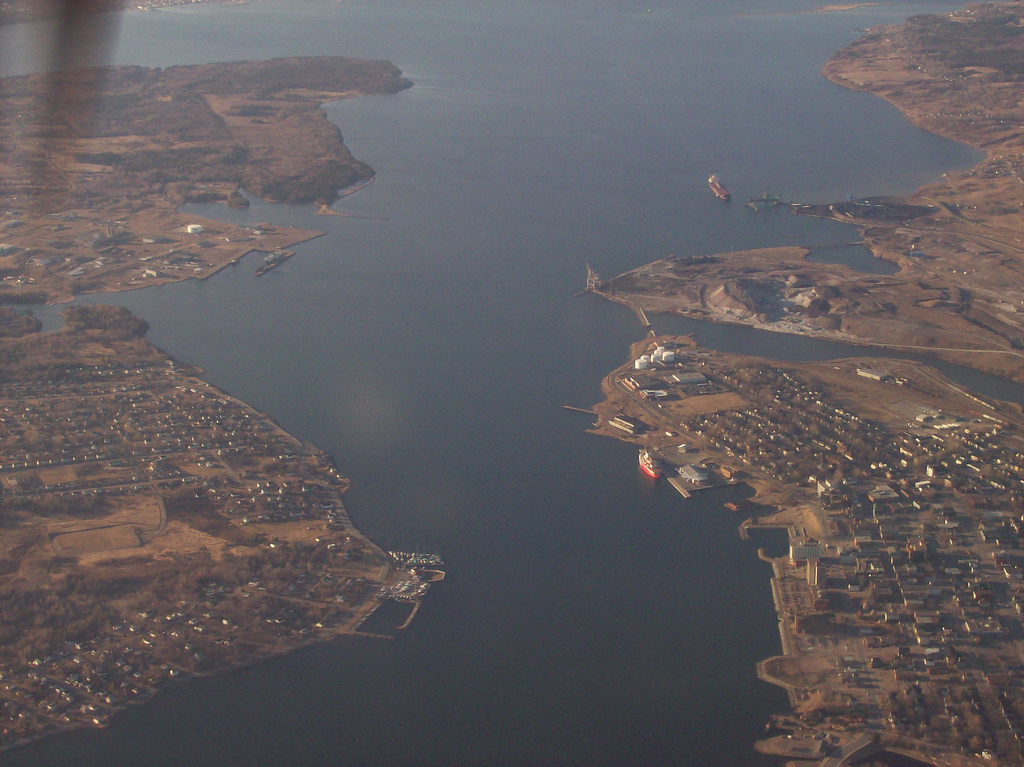
Aerial view of Sydney Harbour

In 1992, the Task Force on Local Government Report (often called the Hayward report) stated that 67 municipalities in Nova Scotia were too many to provide services efficiently and cost-effectively in a province with a population of slightly more than 900,000. The report was commissioned for the Progressive Conservative government of Donald Cameron but was taken up and implemented by the incoming Liberal government of John Savage.

The provincial government subsequently forced the amalgamation of both Halifax and Cape Breton Counties and supported the voluntary amalgamation of Queens County. The Cape Breton Regional Municipality Act was implemented and the CBRM was created on August 1, 1995, whereas the amalgamation in Halifax County took place only on April 1, 1996, with that of Queens County several years later.

The municipalities from which the CBRM was created included the Municipality of the County of Cape Breton, the City of Sydney, the Towns of Glace Bay, Sydney Mines, New Waterford, North Sydney, Dominion and Louisbourg.

== Government ==
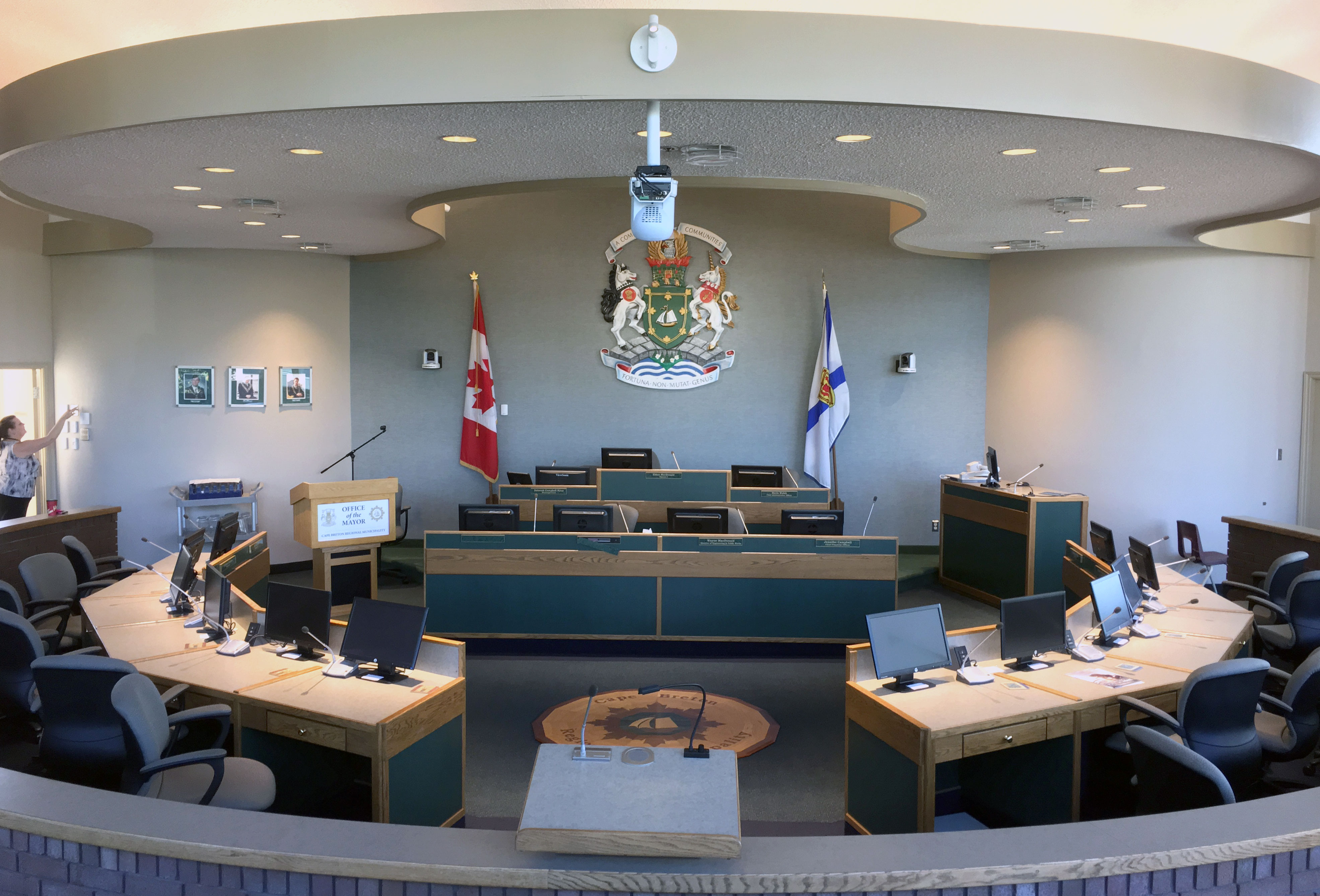
CBRM Council Chambers in City Hall, Sydney, Nova Scotia

The CBRM is governed by Cape Breton Regional Council, which is composed of a mayor elected at-large and 12 councillors each elected to represent a separate district. CBRM is a single-tier municipality governed by a mayor–council system. Regional Council is responsible for all facets of the municipal government, including police, fire, library, transit, and water. The municipality oversaw an operating budget of $146 million and a combined capital and water capital budget of $32.375 million in the 2016/17 fiscal year. The current mayor is Cecil Clarke. Council and its committees meet at least once a month.

Municipal governments in Nova Scotia are elected every four years and the most recent round of elections took place on October 17, 2020. The provincial legislation that creates and empowers the municipality is the Nova Scotia Municipal Government Act. Under former Mayor John Morgan, the council authorized several studies regarding fairness and equity, fighting for a larger share of the federal equalization funding from the province, including an ultimately unsuccessful legal challenge in 2004. Nova Scotians for Equalization Fairness is a citizens group that continues to argue for a greater share of equalization payments paid to CBRM, arguing that CBRM receives $15 million in equalization and should receive $239 million, based on per capita distribution of federal equalization to the province.

In addition to municipal government there are two First Nations in CBRM operating under band government, the Eskasoni First Nation and the Membertou First Nation. CBRM is represented by seven ridings in the Nova Scotia House of Assembly. The municipality shares representation by two ridings in Canada's House of Commons, as well as by Senator Michael L. MacDonald, who identifies as representing the Senate Division of Cape Breton.

== Economy ==
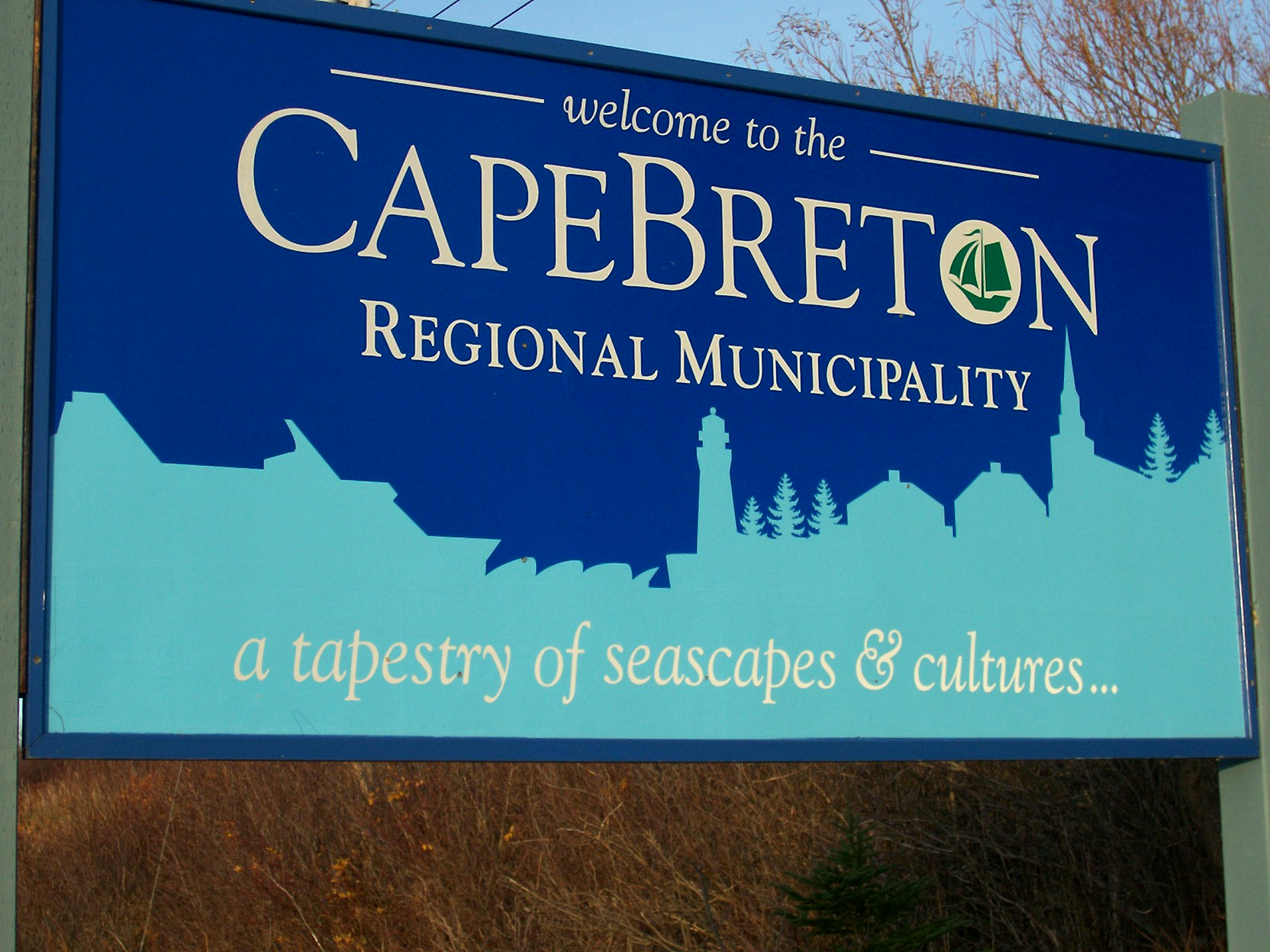
CBRM highway welcome sign.

With the decline of the coal and steel industries in the 1990s CBRM faced significant economic challenges and ongoing population decline. However, since 2017 the region has experienced steady growth. CBRM maintains economic strength in traditional sectors such as fishing and forestry, alongside key service industries including trade, transportation and warehousing, business support, education, healthcare, and hospitality. Despite this diversification, Cape Breton Island continues to face unemployment that is higher than the rest of Nova Scotia, at 8.4%, compared to 6.7%.

CBRM is home to a significant tourism industry. Nearby attractions such as the Cape Breton Highlands, Bras d'Or Lake and Fortress of Louisbourg have made Cape Breton Island a tourism destination for many years. Visitors can experience the art and history that Sydney and area has to offer, or experience Sydney's surging culinary scene. A growing cruise ship business has been making use of the port of Sydney to give cruise passengers access to the area. The Port of Sydney hosts more than 70 cruise ships per season, most notably the Queen Mary 2, Queen Elizabeth 2, and MS Maasdam. A recent study found that a strong tourism cluster is emerging and will be reinforced with the recent announcement of a second cruise ship dock in Sydney.

Currently, the former Sydney Steel Corporation's site in Sydney has been transformed into the Harbourside Commercial Park focused on office and light industrial use, connected in 2010 by the Sydney Port Access Road to Highway 125. As the province's second largest municipality, recent federal policy of increased infrastructure spending will provide added economic stimulus.

== Geography ==
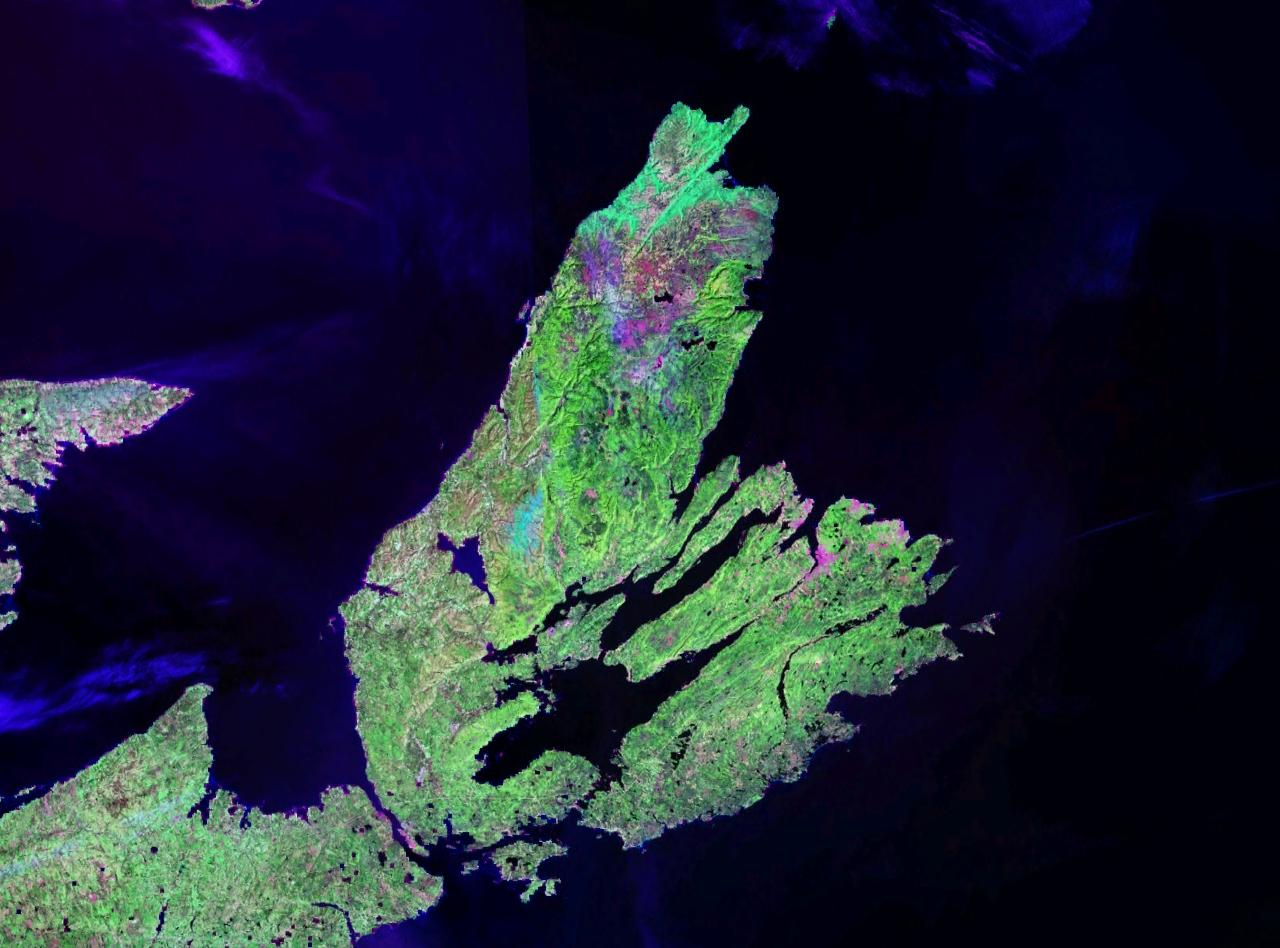
NASA landsat photo of Cape Breton Island

The boundary of CBRM includes all of Cape Breton County except for the Eskasoni and Membertou First Nations.

=== Climate ===
The climate of the CBRM is cool and wet although it is warmer than most other places in Canada. The average annual temperature is close to 6 °C (43 °F). The average summer maximum temperature is 25 °C (77 °F).

Temperatures rarely rise above 30 °C (86 °F). The average winter low is −10 °C (14 °F) and temperatures rarely drop below −20 °C (−4 °F) although strong winter winds can make it seem much colder.

Climate data for Cape Breton Regional Municipality (JA Douglas McCurdy Sydney Airport) WMO ID: 71707; coordinates 46°10′00″N 60°02′53″W; elevation: 61.9 m (203 ft); 1981–2010 normals, extremes 1870–present and from April 1941 to the present day at Sydney Airport.
| Month | Jan | Feb | Mar | Apr | May | Jun | Jul | Aug | Sep | Oct | Nov | Dec | Year |
|---|---|---|---|---|---|---|---|---|---|---|---|---|---|
| Record high humidex | 18.2 | 19.0 | 25.0 | 26.0 | 36.8 | 43.4 | 41.8 | 41.9 | 38.9 | 30.4 | 25.5 | 18.5 | 43.4 |
| Record high °C (°F) | 16.9 (62.4) | 18.0 (64.4) | 24.0 (75.2) | 27.2 (81.0) | 31.1 (88.0) | 34.4 (93.9) | 33.9 (93.0) | 36.7 (98.1) | 32.3 (90.1) | 27.2 (81.0) | 22.2 (72.0) | 16.7 (62.1) | 36.7 (98.1) |
| Mean daily maximum °C (°F) | −1.1 (30.0) | −1.5 (29.3) | 1.5 (34.7) | 6.6 (43.9) | 13.1 (55.6) | 18.6 (65.5) | 23.1 (73.6) | 22.9 (73.2) | 18.8 (65.8) | 12.6 (54.7) | 7.3 (45.1) | 2.1 (35.8) | 10.3 (50.5) |
| Daily mean °C (°F) | −5.4 (22.3) | −5.9 (21.4) | −2.6 (27.3) | 2.5 (36.5) | 7.9 (46.2) | 13.2 (55.8) | 17.9 (64.2) | 18.0 (64.4) | 14.0 (57.2) | 8.5 (47.3) | 3.8 (38.8) | −1.5 (29.3) | 5.9 (42.6) |
| Mean daily minimum °C (°F) | −9.6 (14.7) | −10.3 (13.5) | −6.7 (19.9) | −1.6 (29.1) | 2.7 (36.9) | 7.7 (45.9) | 12.6 (54.7) | 13.1 (55.6) | 9.1 (48.4) | 4.3 (39.7) | 0.2 (32.4) | −5 (23) | 1.4 (34.5) |
| Record low °C (°F) | −31.7 (−25.1) | −31.7 (−25.1) | −31.1 (−24.0) | −17.8 (0.0) | −7.8 (18.0) | −3.9 (25.0) | 0.6 (33.1) | 2.2 (36.0) | −2.2 (28.0) | −5.6 (21.9) | −13.9 (7.0) | −23.3 (−9.9) | −31.7 (−25.1) |
| Record low wind chill | −42.6 | −41.1 | −34.3 | −21.4 | −11.3 | −6.1 | 0.0 | 0.0 | −5.1 | −10.5 | −19.3 | −31.3 | −42.6 |
| Average precipitation mm (inches) | 152.5 (6.00) | 128.1 (5.04) | 130.0 (5.12) | 133.3 (5.25) | 103.2 (4.06) | 96.9 (3.81) | 88.5 (3.48) | 100.2 (3.94) | 118.7 (4.67) | 142.9 (5.63) | 156.0 (6.14) | 167.0 (6.57) | 1,517.2 (59.73) |
| Average rainfall mm (inches) | 80.5 (3.17) | 63.8 (2.51) | 83.2 (3.28) | 112.2 (4.42) | 100.9 (3.97) | 96.9 (3.81) | 88.5 (3.48) | 100.2 (3.94) | 118.7 (4.67) | 142.2 (5.60) | 144.0 (5.67) | 111.2 (4.38) | 1,242.4 (48.91) |
| Average snowfall cm (inches) | 74.3 (29.3) | 65.3 (25.7) | 48.1 (18.9) | 21.4 (8.4) | 2.3 (0.9) | 0.0 (0.0) | 0.0 (0.0) | 0.0 (0.0) | 0.0 (0.0) | 0.62 (0.24) | 12.4 (4.9) | 58.5 (23.0) | 283.0 (111.4) |
| Average precipitation days (≥ 0.2 mm) | 20.6 | 16.5 | 16.6 | 15.8 | 14.5 | 14.0 | 11.7 | 12.7 | 13.5 | 15.9 | 18.1 | 21.0 | 191.0 |
| Average rainy days (≥ 0.2 mm) | 8.4 | 7.3 | 9.5 | 13.0 | 14.1 | 14.0 | 11.7 | 12.7 | 13.5 | 15.8 | 15.4 | 11.5 | 146.9 |
| Average snowy days (≥ 0.2 cm) | 16.6 | 12.6 | 11.0 | 5.6 | 0.83 | 0.0 | 0.0 | 0.0 | 0.0 | 0.62 | 5.4 | 14.2 | 66.8 |
| Average relative humidity (%) (at 15:00 LST) | 72.5 | 72.0 | 69.8 | 69.7 | 65.0 | 64.9 | 65.2 | 65.2 | 67.6 | 70.5 | 74.2 | 75.9 | 69.2 |
| Mean monthly sunshine hours | 91.0 | 111.6 | 132.9 | 141.0 | 198.0 | 224.6 | 246.9 | 228.4 | 167.1 | 130.1 | 77.0 | 68.2 | 1,816.7 |
| Percentage possible sunshine | 32.4 | 38.3 | 36.1 | 34.7 | 42.7 | 47.7 | 51.8 | 52.0 | 44.3 | 38.3 | 27.1 | 25.3 | 39.2 |
Source: Environment and Climate Change Canada

== Demographics ==
Historical population
| Year | Pop. | ±% |
|---|---|---|
| 1851 | 27,520 | — |
| 1861 | 20,866 | −24.2% |
| 1871 | 26,454 | +26.8% |
| 1881 | 31,817 | +20.3% |
| 1891 | 34,244 | +7.6% |
| 1901 | 49,166 | +43.6% |
| 1911 | 73,330 | +49.1% |
| 1921 | 86,319 | +17.7% |
| 1931 | 92,502 | +7.2% |
| 1941 | 110,703 | +19.7% |
| 1951 | 120,306 | +8.7% |
| 1956 | 125,478 | +4.3% |
| 1961 | 131,507 | +4.8% |
| 1971 | 129,075 | −1.8% |
| 1981 | 127,035 | −1.6% |
| 1986 | 123,625 | −2.7% |
| 1991 | 117,403 | −5.0% |
| 1996 | 114,733 | −2.3% |
| 2001 | 105,968 | −7.6% |
| 2006 | 102,250 | −3.5% |
| 2011 | 97,398 | −4.7% |
| 2016 | 94,285 | −3.2% |
| 2021 | 93,694 | −0.6% |
Population prior to 1996 is for Cape Breton County. Population from 1996 onwards is for Cape Breton Regional Municipality, which has the same boundaries as the former county.

Cape Breton county's population has grown to 112,789 and accounted for 10.5% of the provincial population in 2025, up considerably from the 2021 Census of Population conducted by Statistics Canada, the CBRM had a population of 93,694 living in 42,316 of its 46,471 total private dwellings, a change of −0.6% from its 2016 population of 94,285. With a land area of 2,419.7 km^{2} (934.3 sq mi), it had a population density of 38.7/km^{2} (100.3/sq mi) in 2021.

Within the regional municipality there are multiple census population centres (previously known as urban areas). These include Cape Breton-Sydney (population: 30,960), Glace Bay (population: 16,915), Sydney Mines (population: 12,353), New Waterford (population: 6,723), and Howie Centre (population: 1,106).

=== Ethnicity ===
Panethnic groups in the Regional Municipality of Cape Breton (2001−2021)
| Panethnic group | 2021 | | 2016 | | 2011 | | 2006 | | 2001 | |
| Panethnic group | Pop. | % | Pop. | % | Pop. | % | Pop. | % | Pop. | % |
|---|---|---|---|---|---|---|---|---|---|---|
| European (Note: Statistic includes all persons that did not make up part of a visible minority or an indigenous identity.) | 84,185 | 91.49% | 86,810 | 93.79% | 91,010 | 95.32% | 98,175 | 97.22% | 102,405 | 97.98% |
| Indigenous | 2,900 | 3.15% | 3,330 | 3.6% | 2,035 | 2.13% | 1,060 | 1.05% | 675 | 0.65% |
| South Asian | 1,985 | 2.16% | 265 | 0.29% | 265 | 0.28% | 255 | 0.25% | 95 | 0.09% |
| African | 1,250 | 1.36% | 1,100 | 1.19% | 1,130 | 1.18% | 970 | 0.96% | 830 | 0.79% |
| East Asian (Note: Statistic includes total responses of "Chinese", "Korean", and "Japanese" under visible minority section on census.) | 720 | 0.78% | 625 | 0.68% | 490 | 0.51% | 245 | 0.24% | 195 | 0.19% |
| Southeast Asian (Note: Statistic includes total responses of "Filipino" and "Southeast Asian" under visible minority section on census.) | 480 | 0.52% | 145 | 0.16% | 85 | 0.09% | 50 | 0.05% | 75 | 0.07% |
| Middle Eastern (Note: Statistic includes total responses of "West Asian" and "Arab" under visible minority section on census.) | 295 | 0.32% | 210 | 0.23% | 355 | 0.37% | 120 | 0.12% | 140 | 0.13% |
| Latin American | 80 | 0.09% | 40 | 0.04% | 70 | 0.07% | 10 | 0.01% | 20 | 0.02% |
| Other/multiracial (Note: Statistic includes total responses of "Visible minority, n.i.e." and "Multiple visible minorities" under visible minority section on census.) | 125 | 0.14% | 40 | 0.04% | 0 | 0% | 95 | 0.09% | 100 | 0.1% |
| Total responses | 92,020 | 98.21% | 92,555 | 98.17% | 95,475 | 98.03% | 100,980 | 98.76% | 104,515 | 98.63% |
| Total population | 93,694 | 100% | 94,285 | 100% | 97,398 | 100% | 102,250 | 100% | 105,968 | 100% |
Note: Totals greater than 100% due to multiple origin responses

Ethnic origin (2021) Responses 1% or over:
| Ethnicity | Population | Percent |
|---|---|---|
| Scottish | 36,110 | 39.2% |
| Irish | 21,980 | 23.9% |
| English | 19,715 | 21.4% |
| Canadian | 14,965 | 16.3% |
| French | 13,350 | 14.5% |
| Caucasian (White), n.o.s. | 4,875 | 5.3% |
| Cape Bretoner | 3,930 | 4.3% |
| Italian | 3,605 | 3.9% |
| German | 2,965 | 3.2% |
| European n.o.s | 2,635 | 2.9% |
| Polish | 2,245 | 2.4% |
| Acadian | 2,210 | 2.4% |
| Nova Scotian | 2,015 | 2.2% |
| First Nations (North American Indian), n.o.s. + North American Indigenous, n.o.s. | 1,620 | 1.8% |
| Welsh | 1,550 | 1.7% |
| Newfoundlander | 1,465 | 1.6% |
| Ukrainian | 1,340 | 1.5% |
| Indian (India) | 1,295 | 1.4% |
| British Isles n.o.s | 1,285 | 1.4% |
| Dutch (Netherlands) | 1,115 | 1.2% |
| Métis | 1,080 | 1.2% |
| Mi'kmaq, n.o.s. | 935 | 1.0% |
| Lebanese | 895 | 1.0% |

=== Language ===
Mother tongue language (2021)

| Language | Population | Pct (%) |
|---|---|---|
| English only | 93,210 | 95.2% |
| Non-official languages | 2,920 | 3.2% |
| Multiple responses | 850 | 0.9% |
| French only | 710 | 0.8% |

The most reported mother tongues aside from English or French were Punjabi (0.7%), Chinese Languages (0.5%), and Malayalam (0.4%).

=== Religion ===
75.6% of Cape Breton residents identify as Christian in 2021, down from 90.5% in 2011. About 21.9% affiliate with no religion, up from 8.5% in 2011. The remaining 2.6% affiliate with another religion, up from 0.9% in 2011. The largest non-Christian religion was Hinduism with 0.7% of the population. In 2011 there were zero recorded Sikh residents, however by 2021 they accounted for 0.6% of the population making Sikhs the second largest non-Christian group.

== Transportation ==
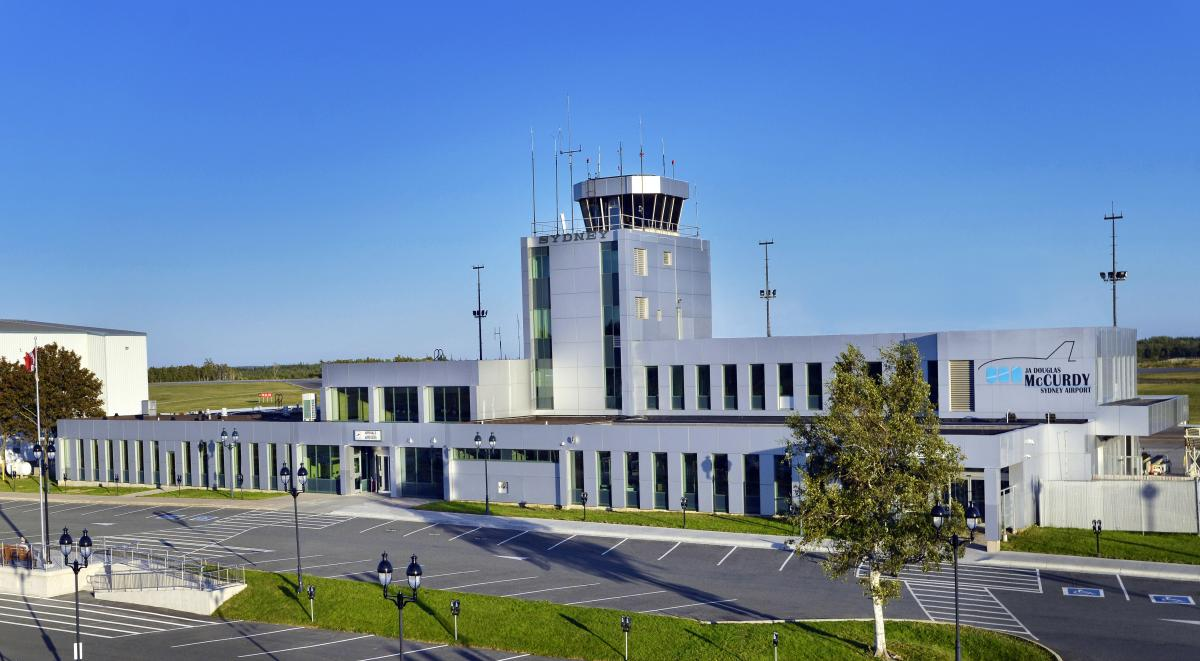
J.A. McCurdy Airport

The Port of Sydney Development Corporation was established in 2015. Owned by the municipality, the port corporation manages and operates the port, including the emerging cruise ship business, the Joan Harriss Cruise Pavilion and Marina. International investors have announced construction of the Novaporte, the deep-water marine container facility able to accommodate ultra-class container ships at the port. Novaporte is proposed to operate as an officially designated Canadian Foreign Trade Zone. The Port of Sydney was projected to welcome a record 135,000 cruise ship visitors in 2017, a 67% increase on 2016.

J.A. Douglas McCurdy Sydney Airport serves CBRM and Cape Breton Island, providing domestic flight connections via Air Canada and WestJet as well as charter flight service. The airport is classified as an airport of entry, staffed by the Canada Border Services Agency. The region is served by Maritime Bus, a coach bus service connecting North Sydney and Sydney to the mainland via Whycocomagh and Wagmatcook. The Cape Breton and Central Nova Scotia Railway provided rail service connecting Cape Breton to the mainland and CN Rail in Truro. Service ended December 30, 2014 though negotiations between the province and the owner to revive the railway are ongoing. Sydney Coal Railway is a short line railway connecting the coaling piers on Sydney Harbour in Sydney to the Lingan Generating Station near New Waterford.

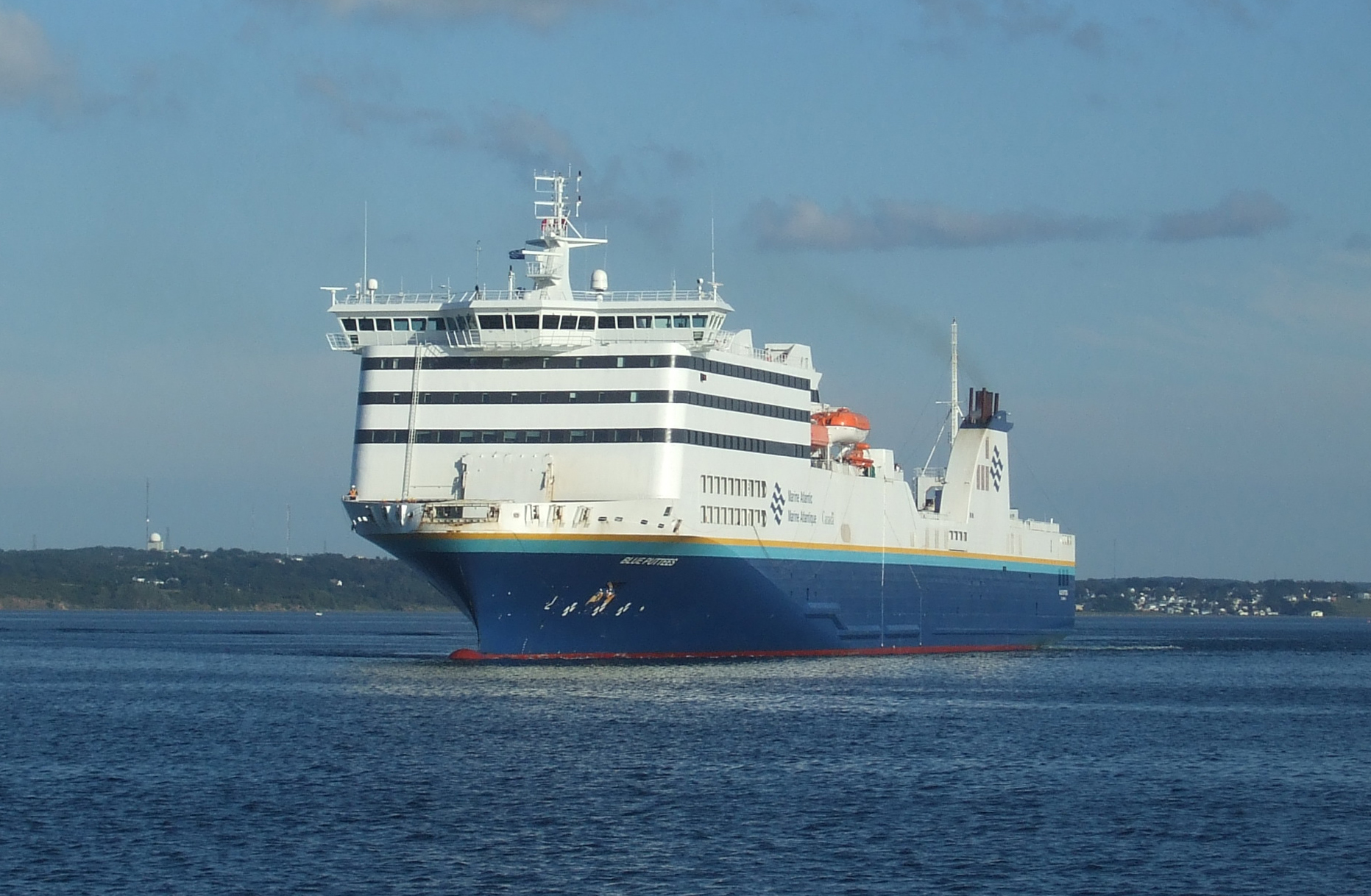
Marine Atlantic ferry Blue Puttees

The municipality is the western terminus of the Marine Atlantic ferry services to Newfoundland. It is also the eastern terminus of two east–west highways in the province: Highway 105, the Trans-Canada Highway, runs along the north shore of Bras d'Or Lake and accesses the northern part of CBRM, whereas Trunk 4 extends along the southern part of Bras d'Or Lake and accesses the western and eastern part of the municipality. Within the municipality communities are served by Highway 125, a regional 4-lane arterial limited access highway that circles Sydney Harbour.

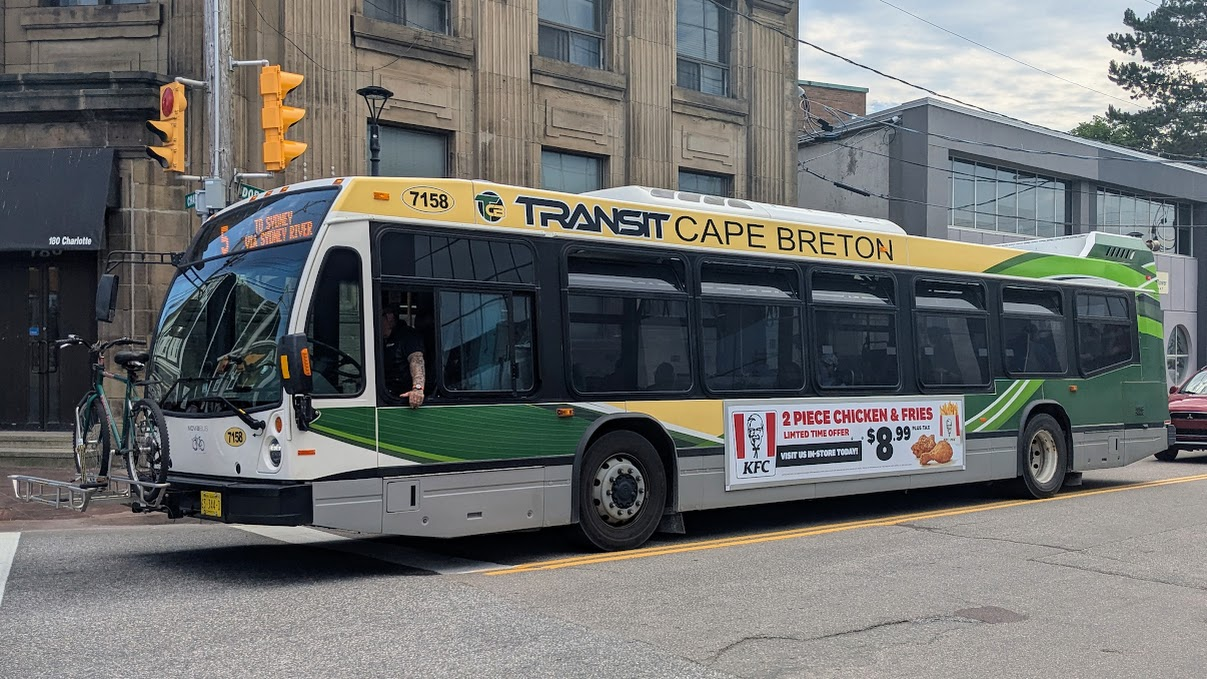
A Transit Cape Breton bus in 2025

Public transit service is delivered by Transit Cape Breton, which offers thirteen bus routes within the municipality, serving the region's larger communities: Sydney, Sydney River, Glace Bay, New Waterford, Dominion, Reserve Mines, North Sydney and Sydney Mines. Handi-Trans paratransit is available for passengers whose disabilities restrict them from using Transit Cape Breton's regular bus service. Fares range from $1.25 to $5, depending on how many zones are travelled.

== Education ==
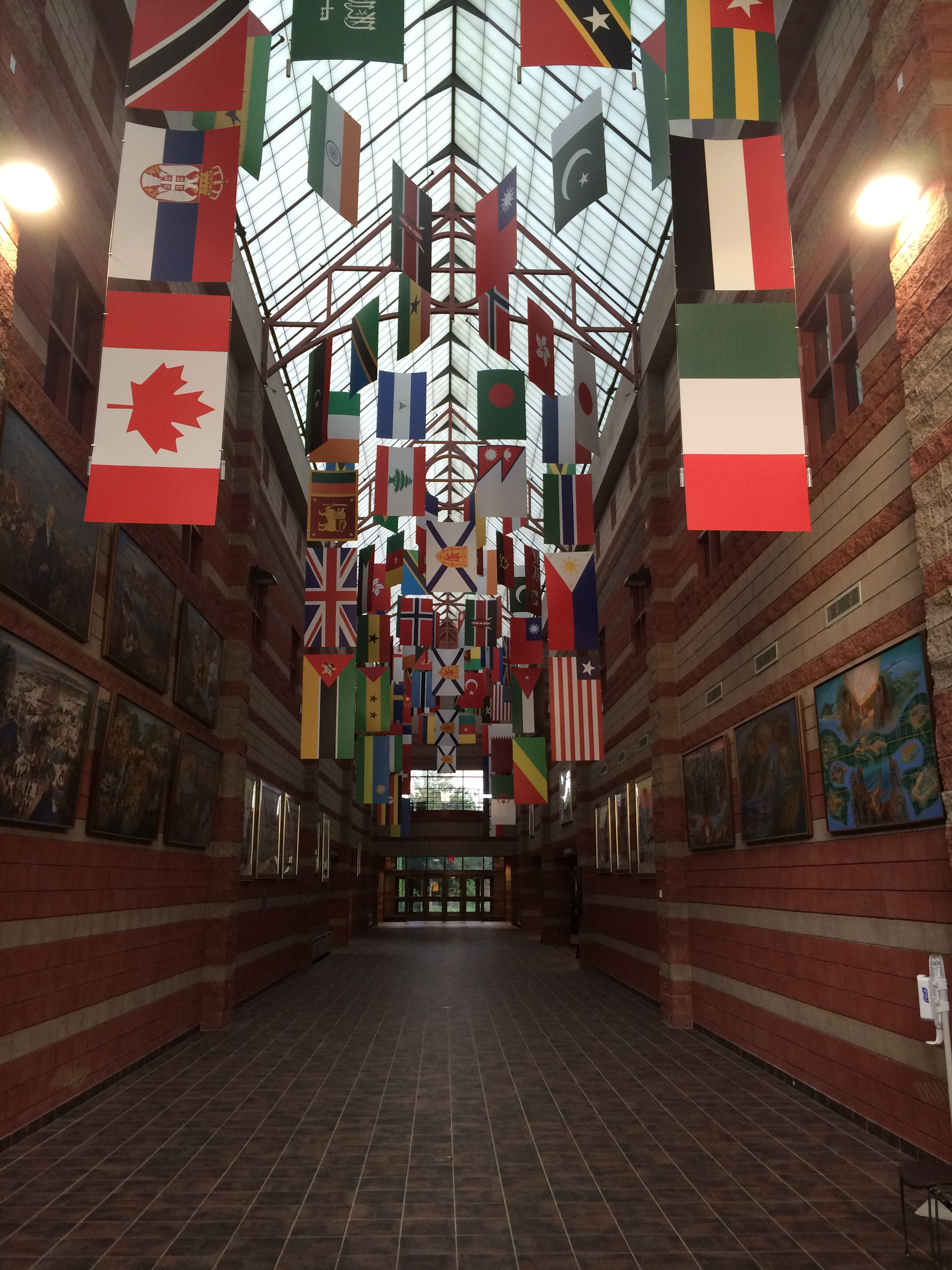
Great Hall of Cape Breton University

The regional municipality is home to several institutions of higher learning:

- Cape Breton University
- NSCC Marconi Campus
- Canadian Coast Guard College

English language public schools in CBRM are operated by the Cape Breton – Victoria Regional Centre for Education on behalf of the provincial government's Department of Education. This regional education office provides instruction for grades primary to 12 in CBRM as well as in neighbouring Victoria County.

French language public school education is administered throughout the province by the Conseil Scolaire Acadien Provincial.

== Culture ==
While Cape Breton Island is known for its Scottish Gaelic or Celtic culture and heritage, the industrial strength of Sydney and industrial Cape Breton attracted a diverse community from around the world. CBRM's cultural scene continues to be influenced by a mixture of these other cultures including African Canadian, Jewish, Irish, and a variety of Eastern European countries.

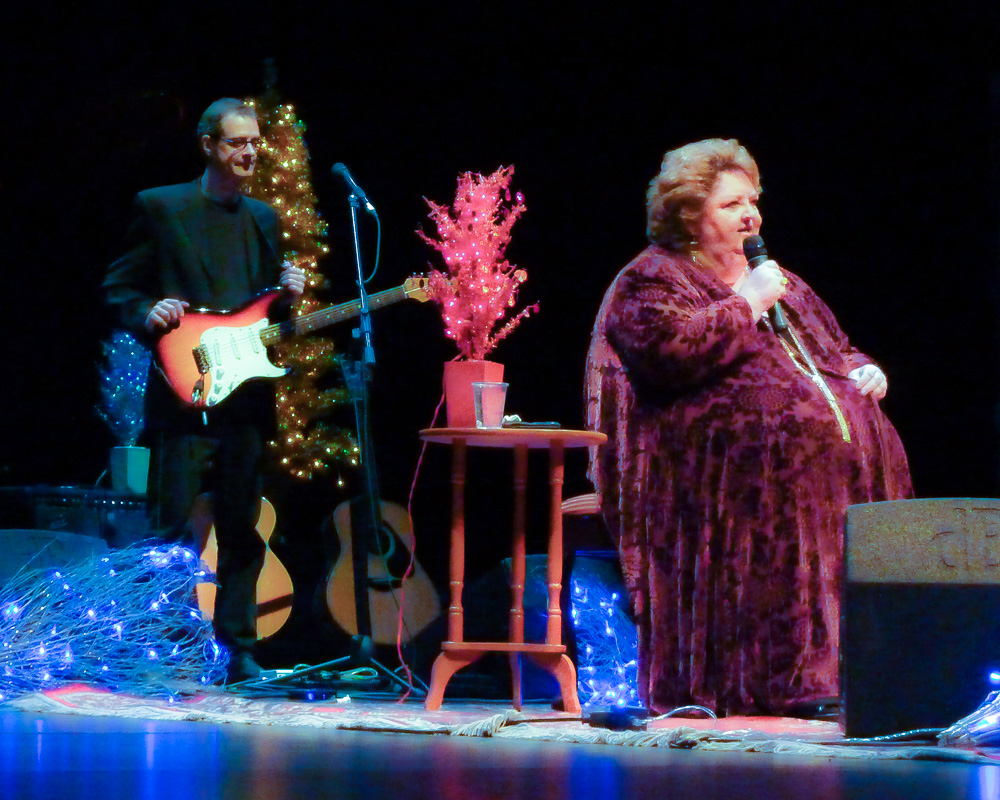
Rita MacNeil performing at the National Arts Centre in 2009

The region is home to several festivals of art and music such as the Celtic Colours International Festival, Lumiere Art at Night, the Cape Breton International Drum Festival, Makin' Waves, and Gobblefest Music Festival. The area is also known for its vibrant music scene, which includes celtic, singer-songwriter, and country artists, as well as underground alternative rock, metal, and punk bands who have played the local circuit since the mid to late 1990s. Among the musicians from CBRM was Canadian country singer Rita MacNeil from the CBRM community of Big Pond, and known for her songs including "Flying On Your Own" and "Working Man." Other notable artists include Tom Fun Orchestra, Slowcoaster, Pretty Archie, Matt Minglewood, Jordan Musycsyn, Carmen Townsend, Morgan Toney, Alicia Penney, and Fire Valley Fire.

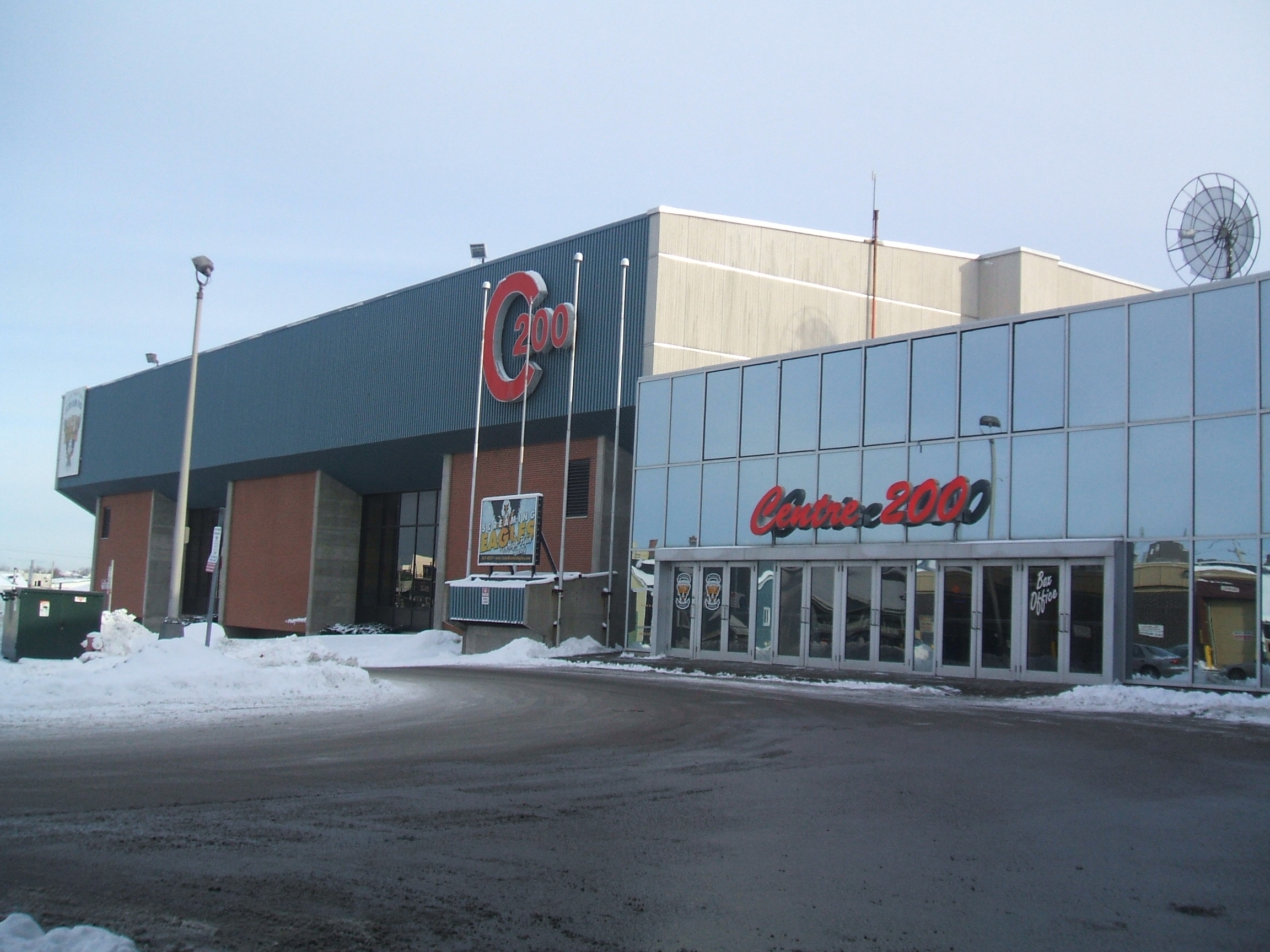
Centre 200, Sydney, Nova Scotia

CBRM is home to several performance centres, including the Centre 200 sports arena in Sydney, home to the Cape Breton Screaming Eagles (a Quebec Major Junior Hockey League team), the Highland Arts Theatre performing arts centre, also in Sydney, and the historic Savoy Theatre, in Glace Bay. The Holy Angels Arts & Cultural centre is currently undergoing a $12 million renovation. Glace Bay is also home to the Cape Breton Miners' Museum, the Marconi National Historic Site and the Glace Bay Heritage Museum. Louisbourg is home to Fortress of Louisbourg, the largest historical reconstruction in North America.

CBRM is home to several media outlets. CBC Radio broadcasts local morning and afternoon broadcasts across Cape Breton Island. Caper Radio, a campus and community radio station, broadcasts local music and college radio from the Student's Union Building in Cape Breton University. There are also five commercial radio stations.

Cape Breton's daily newspaper the Cape Breton Post is a broadsheet focusing on Cape Breton Island. Since August 2024 it is owned by Postmedia Network, after the Saltwire Network went into bankruptcy. About a month after Postmedia's takeover, major layoffs occurred in management, editorial staff, and writers, including cartoonist Michael de Adder which also resulted in local content being replaced by advertisements. Along with the staff layoffs, the George Street headquarters was closed in September 2024 and the building was conditionally sold, but the buyer backed out the agreement.

== Protective services ==
=== Police ===
The Cape Breton Regional Police Service provides policing for all areas of CBRM with the exception of the First Nation community of Eskasoni which is policed by the Royal Canadian Mounted Police (RCMP). The CBRPS operates out of three geographic divisions, Central (Sydney), East (Glace Bay) and North (North Sydney). The CBRPS works towards providing efficient law enforcement and working within the community and has recently cracked down on drug-related crime in CBRM. The current Chief of Police is Robert Walsh.

Policing in Cape Breton County prior to amalgamation was delivered by individual police forces in the urban areas and RCMP in the rural county. In the late 1990s, after a divisive debate, the municipality expanded CBRPS coverage to also cover the rural area of CBRM.

=== Fire & Emergency ===
Fire & emergency services for the CBRM are provided by the Cape Breton Regional Fire Service which consists of 36 fire stations dispersed throughout the municipality; two Sydney stations are staffed by career firefighters whereas the remaining 34 stations are staffed by volunteers. CBRFE has divisions for administration, fire departments, training, fire prevention, volunteer coordination, hazardous materials, building services and bylaws. In addition, paramedic ambulance service in Nova Scotia is provided by the provincial government's Emergency Health Services.

=== Emergency Measures Organization ===
The provincial Emergency Measures Act requires each municipality to develop an emergency measures organization. The municipality has an Emergency Measures Coordinator supported by an EMO Advisory Committee and an Emergency Preparedness Planning Committee.

== Sister cities ==
- Dalian, Liaoning, China (2015). The sister city arrangement, the first ever for a Cape Breton community, follows an announcement that China Communications Construction Company (CCCC) has agreed, contingent on a feasibility study, to design and build a deep water container terminal in Sydney.
- Wałbrzych, Poland: On June 26, 2018, the Council of the CBRM passed a resolution to recognize Wałbrzych as a partner city. This followed a resolution in Wałbrzych on June 21, 2018. The CBRM resolution cited commonalities in post-industrial heritage, and potential future collaboration among historic sites, schools, universities and businesses. Also noted was the CBRM's longstanding Polish community. An agreement was formally signed by both mayors on January 11, 2019, during a video-conference session in the presence of students and representatives of organizations, schools, and universities.

== Access routes ==
Highways and numbered routes that run through the county, including external routes that start or finish at the county limits:

- Highways
  - Hwy 105 (TCH)
  - Hwy 125
  - Hwy 162
- Trunk Routes
  - Trunk 4
  - Trunk 22
  - Trunk 28
- Collector Routes:
  - Route 216
  - Route 223
  - Route 239
  - Route 255
  - Route 305
  - Route 327
- External Routes:
  - None

== Notable people ==
- Mayann Francis, fomer Lieutenant Governor, from Whitney Pier
- Rita MacNeil, songwriter, singer
- Tracy Dares, pianist
- Rick Ravanello, actor

== See also ==
- Communities in the Cape Breton Regional Municipality
