= Spanish Bay (Nova Scotia) =

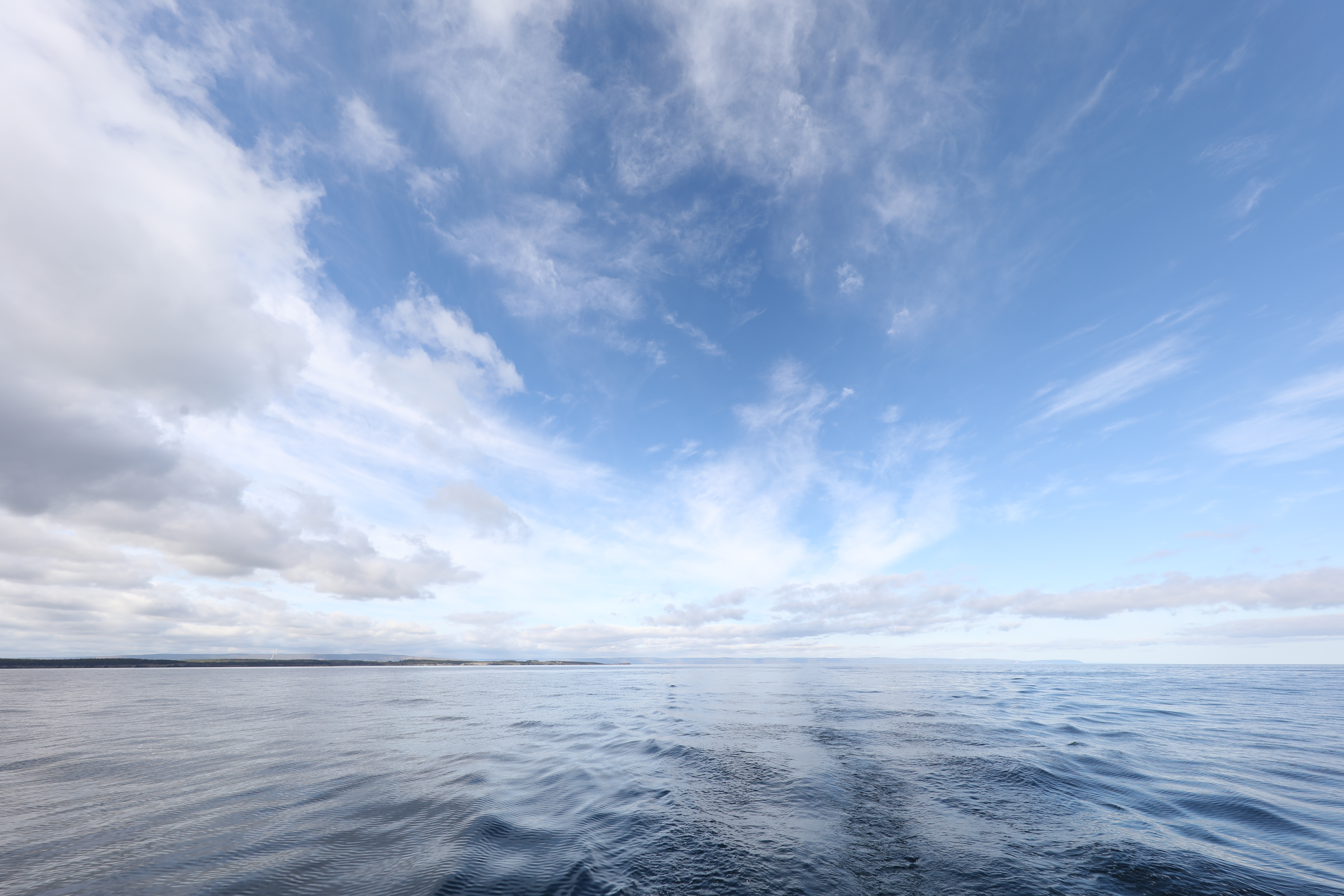

- Spanish Bay in Nova Scotia Spanish Bay (Canada)
- Spanish Bay
- Location: Cape Breton Island, Nova Scotia
- Coordinates: 46°16′45″N 60°12′42″W
- Type: Bay
- Part of: Cabot Strait
- River sources: Sydney River, Balls Creek, Leitches Creek
- Ocean/sea sources: Gulf of Saint Lawrence, Atlantic Ocean
- Basin countries: Canada
- Max. width: 7 nautical miles (13 km; 8.1 mi)
- Settlements: Cape Breton Regional Municipality From west to east: Alder Point; Little Pond; Florence; Sydney Mines; North Sydney; Upper North Sydney; North West Arm; Leitches Creek Station; Leitches Creek; Balls Creek; Point Edward; Edwardsville; Westmount; Sydney River; Sydney; Whitney Pier; South Bar; Victoria Mines; New Victoria
- References: Geographical Names of Canada - Spanish Bay

Spanish Bay is a bay in the Canadian province of Nova Scotia. It is located on the Atlantic coast of Cape Breton Island at the mouth of Sydney Harbour, which forms part of Spanish Bay. The current name for the bay, "Spanish Bay" (sometimes "Spanish Harbour", "Spaniards Bay" or "Port aux Espagnols") appears on maps of the area at least as far back as 1708.

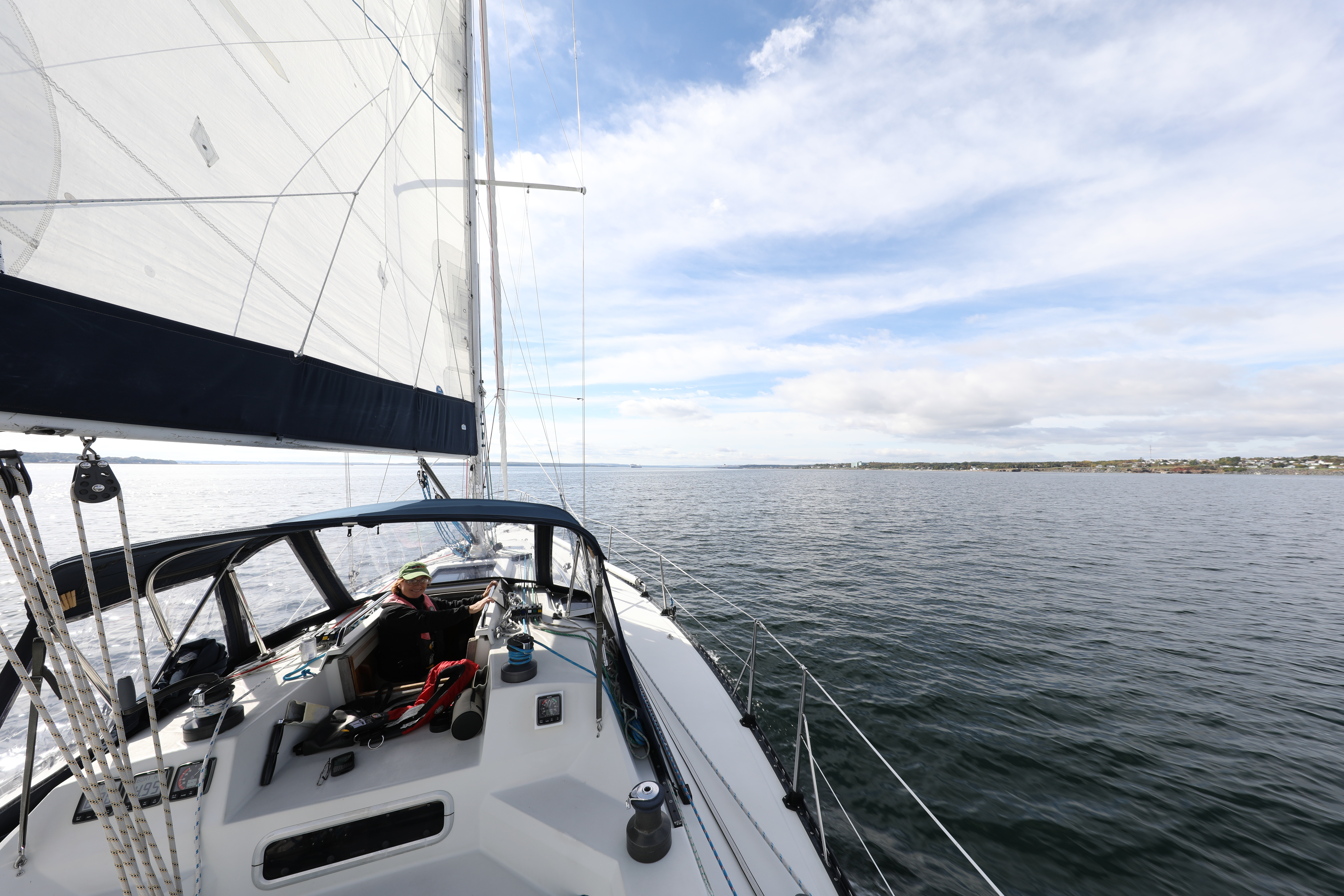
Sailing in Spanish Bay

== Description ==
Spanish Bay opens to the north-west directly onto the southern terminus of the Cabot Strait and so to the Gulf of Saint Lawrence. The bay measures approximately 7 nautical miles (13 km; 8.1 mi) wide at its mouth, between Alder Point on Boularderie Island to the north-west, and Low Point on Cape Breton Island to the south-east.

The bay's shores are mostly bold & rocky with numerous prominent headlands including Point Aconi, High Cape, Alder Point, Merritt Point, Bonar Head, Oxford Point, Black Point, Cranberry Point, McGillivray Point and Petries Point, although there is a 0.75 kilometres (0.47 mi) sandy beach at Florence Beach (Big Pond Beach) and a popular swimming beach at Polar Bear, just to the north of South Bar.

== Communities ==
Communities along the shoreline of Spanish Bay include (from northwest to south to northeast):

Cape Breton County

- Point Aconi
- Alder Point
- Little Pond
- Florence
- Sydney Mines
- North Sydney
- Upper North Sydney
- North West Arm
- Leitches Creek Station
- Leitches Creek
- Balls Creek
- Point Edward
- Edwardsville
- Westmount
- Sydney River
- Sydney
- Whitney Pier
- South Bar
- Victoria Mines
- New Victoria

== See also ==
- List of communities in Nova Scotia
