= List of designated places in Nova Scotia =

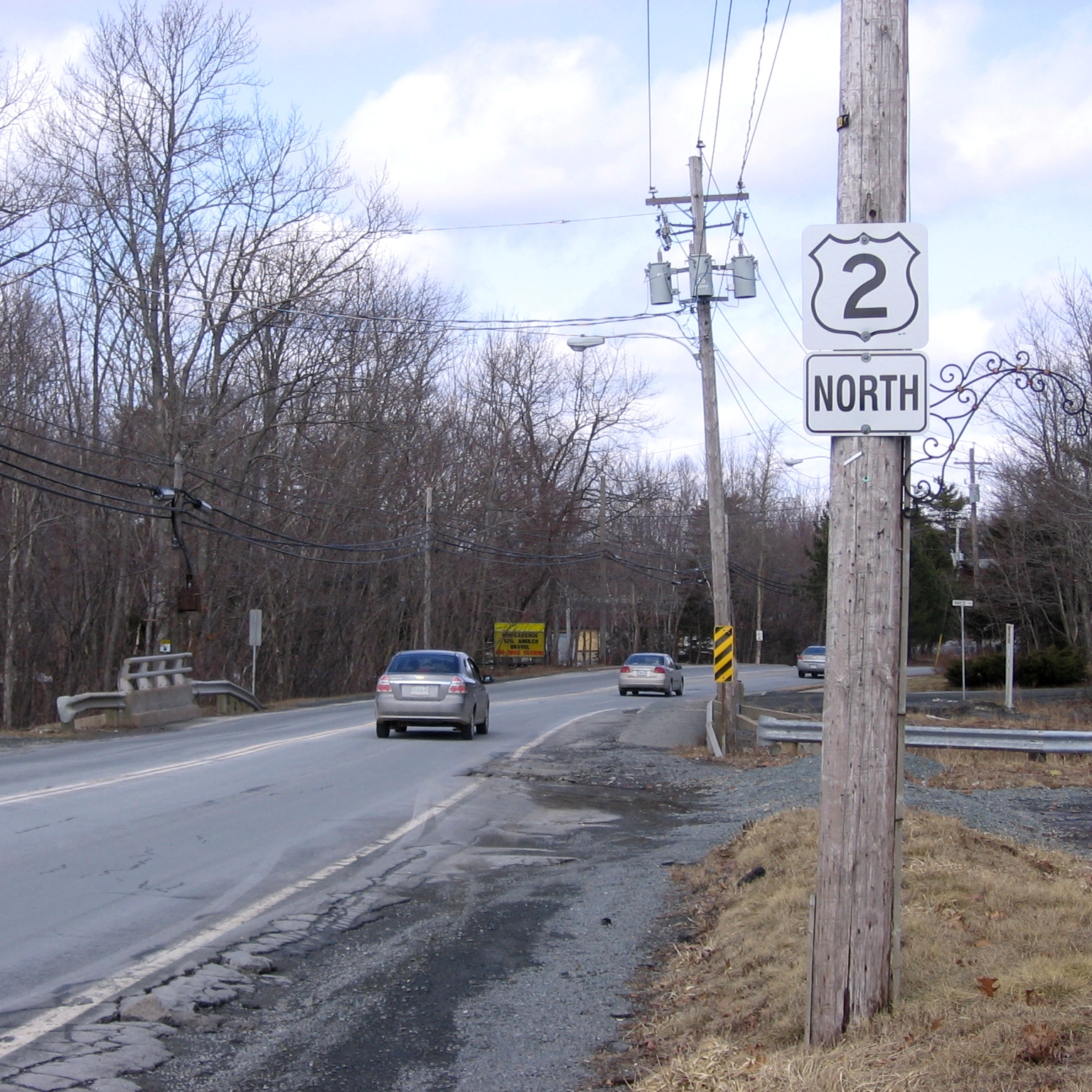
Nova Scotia Trunk 2 through Fall River, Nova Scotia's most populous designated place

A designated place is a type of geographic unit used by Statistics Canada to disseminate census data. It is usually "a small community that does not meet the criteria used to define incorporated municipalities or Statistics Canada population centres (areas with a population of at least 1,000 and no fewer than 400 persons per square kilometre)." Provincial and territorial authorities collaborate with Statistics Canada in the creation of designated places so that data can be published for sub-areas within municipalities. Starting in 2016, Statistics Canada allowed the overlapping of designated places with population centres.

In the 2021 Census of Population, Nova Scotia had 70 designated places, an increase from 68 in 2016. Designated place types in Nova Scotia include 66 class IV areas and 4 retired population centres. In 2021, the 70 designated places had a cumulative population of 44,090 and an average population of 630. Nova Scotia's largest designated place is Bible Hill with a population of 5,076.

== List ==
List of designated places in Nova Scotia
| Name | Type | County | 2021 Census of Population | | | | |
| Name | Type | County | Population (2021) | Population (2016) | Change (%) | Land area (km^{2}) | Population density (per km^{2}) |
|---|---|---|---|---|---|---|---|
| Alder Point | Class IV area | Cape Breton | 461 | 484 | −4.8% | 5.14 | 89.7/km^{2} |
| Aylesford | Class IV area | Kings | 834 | 833 | +0.1% | 4.08 | 204.4/km^{2} |
| Baddeck | Class IV area | Victoria | 818 | 826 | −1.0% | 2.11 | 387.7/km^{2} |
| Bible Hill | Class IV area | Colchester | 5,076 | 4,894 | +3.7% | 9.24 | 549.4/km^{2} |
| Black Point | Class IV area | Halifax | 486 | 452 | +7.5% | 1.48 | 328.4/km^{2} |
| Boutlier's Point | Class IV area | Halifax | 781 | 765 | +2.1% | 2.6 | 300.4/km^{2} |
| Bras D'Or | Class IV area | Cape Breton | 96 | 104 | −7.7% | 1.02 | 94.1/km^{2} |
| Bridgetown | Retired population centre | Annapolis | 970 | 949 | +2.2% | 3.63 | 267.2/km^{2} |
| Brookfield | Class IV area | Colchester | 439 | 445 | −1.3% | 1.27 | 345.7/km^{2} |
| Brooklyn | Class IV area | Queens | 849 | 916 | −7.3% | 9.44 | 89.9/km^{2} |
| Cambridge | Class IV area | Kings | 703 | 867 | −18.9% | 3.77 | 186.5/km^{2} |
| Canning | Class IV area | Kings | 716 | 731 | −2.1% | 1.86 | 384.9/km^{2} |
| Carleton Corner | Class IV area | Annapolis | 99 | 106 | −6.6% | 0.66 | 150.0/km^{2} |
| Centreville | Class IV area | Kings | 1,159 | 1,129 | +2.7% | 2.36 | 491.1/km^{2} |
| Coldbrook part A | Class IV area | Kings | 233 | 240 | −2.9% | 2.18 | 106.9/km^{2} |
| Coldbrook part B | Class IV area | Kings | 973 | 1,025 | −5.1% | 4.94 | 197.0/km^{2} |
| Cornwallis Park | Class IV area | Annapolis | 488 | 479 | +1.9% | 2.14 | 228.0/km^{2} |
| Cow Bay | Class IV area | Halifax | 1,224 | 1,257 | −2.6% | 5.79 | 211.4/km^{2} |
| Donkin | Class IV area | Cape Breton | 532 | 524 | +1.5% | 9.5 | 56.0/km^{2} |
| Edwardsville | Class IV area | Cape Breton | 287 | 267 | +7.5% | 8.08 | 35.5/km^{2} |
| Elmsdale | Class IV area | Hants | 413 | 360 | +14.7% | 2.99 | 138.1/km^{2} |
| Enfield | Class IV area | Hants | 36 | 37 | −2.7% | 0.12 | 300.0/km^{2} |
| English Corner | Retired population centre | Halifax | 1,058 | 1,151 | −8.1% | 2.78 | 380.6/km^{2} |
| Fall River | Class IV area | Halifax | 2,474 | 2,337 | +5.9% | 14.89 | 166.2/km^{2} |
| Falmouth | Class IV area | Hants | 1,553 | 1,368 | +13.5% | 5.21 | 298.1/km^{2} |
| Freeport | Class IV area | Digby | 217 | 223 | −2.7% | 7.57 | 28.7/km^{2} |
| Granville Ferry | Class IV area | Annapolis | 152 | 110 | +38.2% | 0.43 | 353.5/km^{2} |
| Greenwood | Class IV area | Kings | 0 | 0 | NA | 0.37 | 0.0/km^{2} |
| Groves Point | Class IV area | Cape Breton | 254 | 258 | −1.6% | 7.63 | 33.3/km^{2} |
| Guysborough | Class IV area | Guysborough | 397 | 363 | +9.4% | 3.09 | 128.5/km^{2} |
| Hammonds Plains Road | Retired population centre | Halifax | 1,819 | 1,859 | −2.2% | 3.18 | 572.0/km^{2} |
| Hants Border | Class IV area | Kings | 408 | 393 | +3.8% | 1.29 | 316.3/km^{2} |
| Havre Boucher | Class IV area | Antigonish | 281 | 309 | −9.1% | 2.69 | 104.5/km^{2} |
| Hebbville | Class IV area | Lunenburg | 796 | 802 | −0.7% | 15.79 | 50.4/km^{2} |
| Hillside | Class IV area | Pictou | 122 | 149 | −18.1% | 1.38 | 88.4/km^{2} |
| Hubbards | Class IV area | Halifax | 387 | 364 | +6.3% | 2.29 | 169.0/km^{2} |
| Lantz | Retired population centre | Hants | 1,703 | 2,229 | −23.6% | 2.97 | 573.4/km^{2} |
| Lawrencetown | Class IV area | Annapolis | 636 | 516 | +23.3% | 5.62 | 113.2/km^{2} |
| Lequille | Class IV area | Annapolis | 182 | 222 | −18.0% | 0.71 | 256.3/km^{2} |
| Lingan | Class IV area | Cape Breton | 229 | 261 | −12.3% | 3.99 | 57.4/km^{2} |
| Little Bras D'Or | Class IV area | Cape Breton | 148 | 135 | +9.6% | 3.85 | 38.4/km^{2} |
| Little Pond | Class IV area | Cape Breton | 169 | 183 | −7.7% | 4.35 | 38.9/km^{2} |
| Louisbourg | Class IV area | Cape Breton | 825 | 877 | −5.9% | 3.3 | 250.0/km^{2} |
| Masstown | Class IV area | Colchester | 156 | 164 | −4.9% | 0.76 | 205.3/km^{2} |
| Mill Creek | Class IV area | Cape Breton | 413 | 430 | −4.0% | 7.29 | 56.7/km^{2} |
| Milton | Class IV area | Queens | 999 | 999 | 0.0% | 7.18 | 139.1/km^{2} |
| Milton Highlands | Class IV area | Yarmouth | 320 | 343 | −6.7% | 1.48 | 216.2/km^{2} |
| New Germany | Class IV area | Lunenburg | 447 | 458 | −2.4% | 2.49 | 179.5/km^{2} |
| Point Aconi | Class IV area | Cape Breton | 113 | 134 | −15.7% | 10.11 | 11.2/km^{2} |
| Port Caledonia | Class IV area | Cape Breton | 212 | 214 | −0.9% | 10.04 | 21.1/km^{2} |
| Port Hastings | Class IV area | Inverness | 90 | 89 | +1.1% | 0.86 | 104.7/km^{2} |
| Port Williams | Class IV area | Kings | 1,110 | 1,186 | −6.4% | 2.93 | 378.8/km^{2} |
| Priestville | Class IV area | Pictou | 157 | 163 | −3.7% | 0.72 | 218.1/km^{2} |
| Prime Brook | Class IV area | Cape Breton | 186 | 183 | +1.6% | 6.77 | 27.5/km^{2} |
| Pugwash | Class IV area | Cumberland | 746 | 736 | +1.4% | 9.8 | 76.1/km^{2} |
| River Hebert | Class IV area | Cumberland | 468 | 453 | +3.3% | 6.02 | 77.7/km^{2} |
| River Ryan | Class IV area | Cape Breton | 239 | 238 | +0.4% | 4.73 | 50.5/km^{2} |
| Sandy Point | Class IV area | Shelburne | 369 | 347 | +6.3% | 2.44 | 151.2/km^{2} |
| Shubenacadie part A | Class IV area | Hants | 401 | 735 | −45.4% | 4 | 100.3/km^{2} |
| Shubenacadie part B | Class IV area | Colchester | 10 | 187 | −94.7% | 2.12 | 4.7/km^{2} |
| St. Margaret's Bay | Class IV area | Halifax | 840 | 782 | +7.4% | 2.51 | 334.7/km^{2} |
| Sydney River | Class IV area | Cape Breton | 455 | 367 | +24.0% | 6.68 | 68.1/km^{2} |
| Tatamagouche | Class IV area | Colchester | 691 | 755 | −8.5% | 8.05 | 85.8/km^{2} |
| Terrence Bay | Class IV area | Halifax | 678 | 749 | −9.5% | 3.37 | 201.2/km^{2} |
| Tower Road | Class IV area | Cape Breton | 295 | 272 | +8.5% | 9.07 | 32.5/km^{2} |
| Upper North Sydney | Class IV area | Cape Breton | 387 | 406 | −4.7% | 11.18 | 34.6/km^{2} |
| Waterville | Class IV area | Kings | 703 | 747 | −5.9% | 1.79 | 392.7/km^{2} |
| Waverley | Class IV area | Halifax | 858 | 813 | +5.5% | 2.9 | 295.9/km^{2} |
| Wedgeport | Class IV area | Yarmouth | 1,071 | 1,061 | +0.9% | 9.64 | 111.1/km^{2} |
| Westport | Class IV area | Digby | 193 | 218 | −11.5% | 11.68 | 16.5/km^{2} |
| Total designated places | — | — | 44,090 | 45,028 | −2.1% | 324.39 | 135.9/km^{2} |
| Province of Nova Scotia | — | — | 969,383 | 923,598 | +5.0% | 52,824.71 | 18.4/km^{2} |

== See also ==
- List of census agglomerations in Atlantic Canada
- List of population centres in Nova Scotia
