= Nova Scotia Highway 125 =

Highway in Nova Scotia

Highway 125
- Peacekeepers Way
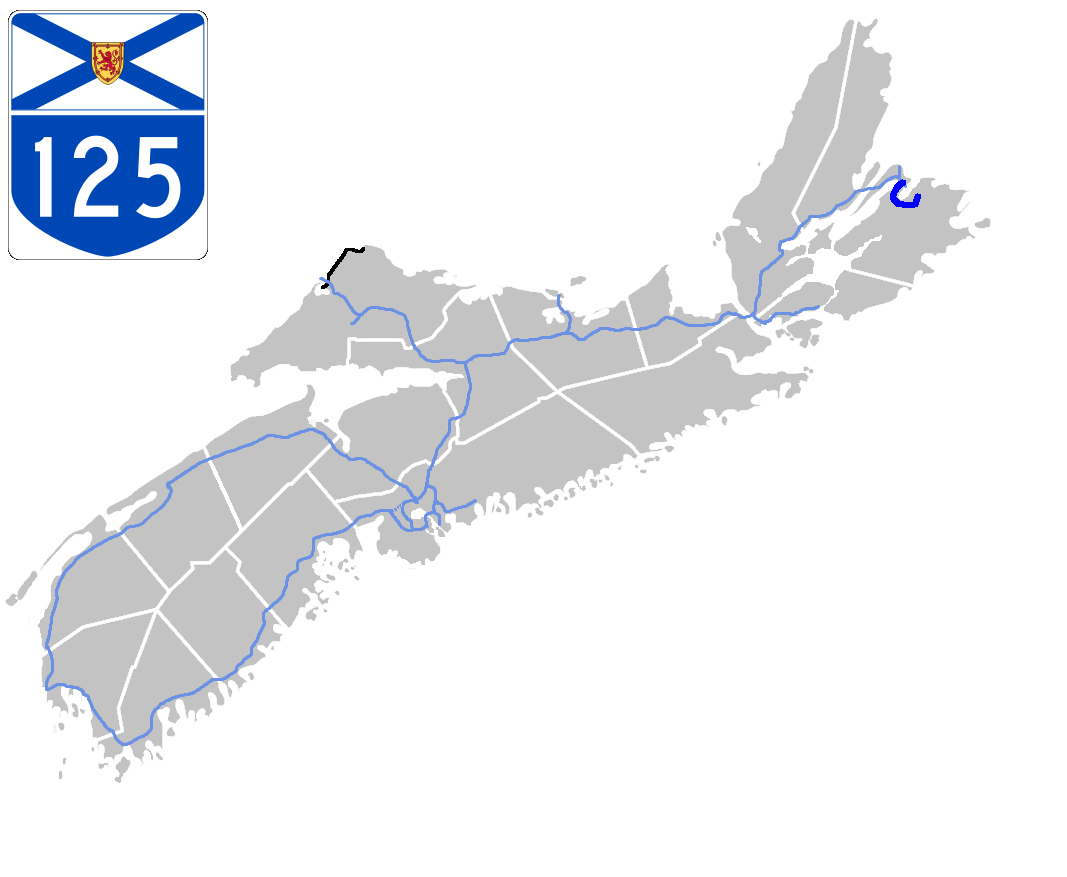

Route information
- Maintained by Nova Scotia Department of Transportation and Infrastructure Renewal
- Length: 28.3 km (17.6 mi)
- Existed: 1970–present

Major junctions
- West end: Hwy 105 (TCH) near Sydney Mines
- Trunk 4 in Sydney River; Trunk 22 near Sydney
- East end: Trunk 4 in Sydney

Location
- Country: Canada
- Province: Nova Scotia

Highway system
- Provincial highways in Nova Scotia; 100-series
← Hwy 118	→ Hwy 142

Highway 125 is a 28 km long controlled-access highway located in Nova Scotia's Cape Breton Regional Municipality. The provincial government named it Peacekeepers Way on August 18, 2008. Part of the provincial 100-series arterial highway network, Highway 125 encircles the west side of Sydney Harbour, from an interchange with Highway 105 (the Trans-Canada Highway) at Sydney Mines to Trunk 4 (Grand Lake Road) immediately east of Sydney.

== Route description ==
The northern third of the highway was upgraded during the late 1990s and early 2000s from a two-lane freeway to a twinned 4-lane freeway. Particularly problematic was that the highway passes in proximity to Pottle Lake, the water supply reservoir for North Sydney, which required installation of pollution control monitoring and containment systems.

In 2002 a connector road was built from the Grand Lake Road interchange which gives access to the port of Sydney at the former Sydney Steel Corporation property which is now an industrial park.

In the fall of 2006, an additional interchange was opened at Coxheath Road, offering direct access to the communities of Coxheath, Blacketts Lake, and the Cantley Village subdivision.

In January 2008, a public meeting was held to discuss the required infrastructure to finally twin Highway 125 from its six lane divided portion in Sydney River to its eastern terminus at Grand Lake Road. The design work and implementation will require the construction of a roundabout at the George Street exit (in addition to the roundabout at the Alexandra Street exit that was completed in December 2009), as well as over-pass structures for George Street, and Cow Bay Road/Upper Prince Street. The Cow Bay Road/Upper Prince Street overpass has now been cancelled, and a round-a-about is being proposed for Exit 9. At-grade intersections will be eliminated, and access roads will be constructed for a DND small arms range between Exits 8 (George Street) and Exit 9 (Grand Lake Road/SPAR), as well as the fresh water reservoir. The project is expected to be completed in 2012.

On December 4, 2010, twinning was completed from Exit 4 near Balls Creek to Exit 5A near Coxheath.

== History ==
The highway was built in the late 1950s - early 1960s and extended from North Sydney to Point Edward, but branched off in Point Edward and continued along Nova Scotia Route 305 then Trunk 5 until Sydney River. When Highway 125 bypassed the Trunk 5 sections of 125 in the late 1960s - early 1970s it became a controlled access highway for a lot of the highway. In 1970 the highway extended to Grand Lake Road bypassing Sydney to Nova Scotia Trunk 4.

Twinning of a 3-km section (to four lanes, divided), from north of Exit 3 (near Johnson Lake) to south of Exit 4 (Balls Creek), began in 1980 and was completed in the 1984/85 fiscal year. Three at-grade intersections were removed, and the two grade-separated interchanges were constructed. The project included nine construction contracts and cost around $11.5 million.

From the late 1990s- early 2000s it was twinned around North Sydney and waterlines were placed around Pottle Lake. In 2010 the highway was twinned from Point Edward to Sydney River. In 2014 and 2015 the highway was twinned between Sydney River and Grand Lake Road (its eastern terminus).

== Exit list ==
The entire route is located in Cape Breton Regional Municipality.

Location	km	mi	Exit	Destinations	Notes
Sydney Mines	−2.0	−1.2		Main Street (Route 305 south) – Sydney Mines, North Sydney Pond Road (Route 305 north) – Florence	Continues as Main Street
Sydney Mines	0.0	0.0	1	Hwy 105 (TCH) – Baddeck, Canso Causeway, North Sydney, Newfoundland ferry	Signed as Exit 1E (east) and 1W (west); exit 20 on Hwy 105; Wikimapia view
North Sydney	2.5	1.6	2	Johnston Road, King Street	Wikimapia view
	8.8	5.5	3	Route 305 / Route 223 west (Bras d'Or Lakes Scenic Drive) – Boisdale, Grand Narrows	Wikimapia view
	11.5	7.1	4	To Route 239 (Frenchvale Road) – Balls Creek, Point Edward, Frenchvale	Wikimapia view
	15.8	9.8	5	To Route 305 / Route 239 (Sydport Access Road) – Coxheath, Westmount, Sydport	Wikimapia view
Coxheath	18.0	11.2	5A	Coxheath Road – Coxheath, Westmount, Blacketts Lake	Wikimapia view
Sydney River	18.7	11.6	Crosses the Sydney River		
Sydney River	19.1	11.9	6	Trunk 4 (Kings Road) – Sydney, St. Peters, Port Hawkesbury	Signed as Exit 6W (west) and 6E (east); Wikimapia view
Sydney	21.2	13.2	7	Route 327 (Alexandra Street) – Sydney, Gabarus	Wikimapia view
Sydney	22.4	13.9	7A	Churchill Drive	Wikimapia view
Sydney	24.2	15.0	8	Trunk 22 (George Street, Marconi Trail) – Sydney, Louisbourg	Wikimapia view
Sydney	28.3	17.6	(9)	Trunk 4 (Grand Lake Road) – Sydney, Airport, Glace Bay, New Waterford Sydney Port Access Road	At-grade; traffic signals; continues as Sydney Port Access Road; Wikimapia view
1.000 mi = 1.609 km; 1.000 km = 0.621 mi: Closed/former; Note: Exit numbers in Nova Scotia are sequential.
