= Nova Scotia Route 305 =

Highway in Nova Scotia, Canada

Route 305

Route information
- Maintained by Nova Scotia Department of Transportation and Infrastructure Renewal
- Length: 27 km (17 mi)

Major junctions
- South end: Trunk 4 in Sydney River
- Route 239 in Westmount; Hwy 125 in Leitches Creek Station
- North end: Hwy 105 (TCH) in Little Bras d'Or

Location
- Country: Canada
- Province: Nova Scotia
- Counties: Cape Breton Regional Municipality

Highway system
- Provincial highways in Nova Scotia; 100-series
← Route 304	→ Route 306

Route 305 is a collector road in the Canadian province of Nova Scotia.

It is located in the Cape Breton Regional Municipality and connects Little Bras d'Or at Highway 105 with Westmount at Trunk 4. It was originally known as Trunk 5 until 1970. In the 1960s between Point Edward and Sydney River this highway was also used for Nova Scotia Highway 125.

== Communities ==
- Little Bras d'Or
- Florence
- Sydney Mines
- North Sydney
- Coxheath
- Westmount
- Sydney River

== See also ==
- List of Nova Scotia provincial highways
