= Indian reserve =

Land in Canada set aside by the Indian Act for First Nations

- Category: Administrative division
- Location: Canada
- Created by: Constitution Act, 1867
- Created: July 1, 1867
- Number: 3,394 (as of 2020)
- Government: Band government

In Canada, an Indian reserve (French: réserve indienne) (Note: Indian is used here because of the historical nature of the article and the precision of the name, as with Indian hospital. It was, and continues to be, used by government officials, Indigenous peoples and historians while referencing the school system. The use of the name also provides relevant context about the era in which the system was established, specifically one in which Indigenous peoples in Canada were homogeneously referred to as Indians rather than by language that distinguishes First Nations, Inuit and Métis peoples. Use of Indian is limited throughout the article to proper nouns and references to government legislation.) or First Nations reserve (French: réserve des premières nations) is defined by the Indian Act as a "tract of land, the legal title to which is vested in Her Majesty, that has been set apart by Her Majesty for the use and benefit of a band."

Reserves are areas set aside for First Nations, one of the major groupings of Indigenous peoples in Canada, after a contract with the Canadian state ("the Crown"), and are not to be confused with Indigenous peoples' claims to ancestral lands under Aboriginal title.

== Demographics ==
Canada has designated 3,394 reserves for over 600 First Nations, as per the federal publication "Registered Indian Population by Sex and Residence," Indian Status is granted to members of a registered band who are eligible to live on these reserves. By 2020, reserves provided shelter for approximately half of these band members.

Many reserves have no resident population, such as the Kainai Nation (Blood) which has Blood 148 (population 4,572 at the 2021 census), and Blood 148A (population 0 at the 2021 census). Typically they are small, remote, non-contiguous pieces of land, a fact which has led many to be abandoned, or used only seasonally (as a trapping territory, for example). Statistics Canada counts only those reserves which are populated (or potentially populated) as "subdivisions" for the purpose of the national census.

At the 2021 Canadian census there were over 3,200 reserves across the country. Of these, 992 were census subdivisions, including 73 that had been added and 28 that had been removed since the 2016 census. Some reserves that were originally rural were gradually surrounded by urban development. Montreal, Vancouver and Calgary are examples of cities with urban Indian reserves.

== Governance ==
Band governments may administer more than one reserve, such as the Beaver First Nation with two reserves, Boyer 164 and Child Lake 164A, or the Membertou First Nation, with Caribou Marsh 29, Sydney 28A, and Membertou 28B.

Some reserves are shared by multiple bands, whether as fishing camps or educational facilities such as Pekw'Xe:yles, a reserve on the Fraser River used by 21 bands. Another multi-band reserve of the Stó꞉lō peoples is Grass Indian Reserve No. 15, which is located in Chilliwack and is shared by nine bands.

== History ==
=== Treaties and reserves, 1763–1867 ===
After the Royal Proclamation of 1763 but before Confederation in 1867, the Upper Canada Treaties (1764–1862 Ontario) and the Douglas Treaties (1850–1854 British Columbia) were signed. "Some of these pre-confederation and post-confederation treaties addressed reserve lands, hunting, fishing, trapping rights, annuities and other benefits." Governor James Douglas of the Colony of British Columbia, which formally became a colony in 1858, also worked to establish many reserves on the mainland during his tenure, though most of these were overturned by successor colonial governments and later royal commissions once the province joined Confederation in 1871.

=== Constitution Act 1867 ===
In 1867, legislative jurisdiction over "Indians and Lands reserved for the Indians" was assigned to the Parliament of Canada through the Constitution Act, 1867, a major part of Canada's Constitution (originally known as the British North America Act), which acknowledged that First Nations had special status. Separate powers covered "status and civil rights on the one hand and Indian lands on the other."

In 1870, the newly formed Government of Canada acquired Rupert's Land, a vast territory in British North America consisting mostly of the Hudson Bay drainage basin that had been controlled by the Hudson's Bay Company under its charter with the British Crown from 1670 to 1870. Numerous aboriginal groups lived in the same territory and disputed the sovereignty of the area. The government promised Britain to honour the provisions of the Royal Proclamation of 1763 to "negotiate with its Amerindians for the extinguishment of their title and the setting aside of reserves for their exclusive use." This promise led to the Numbered Treaties.

=== Numbered treaties, 1871–1921 ===
Between 1871 and 1921, through Numbered Treaties with First Nations, the Canadian government gained large areas of land for settlers and for industry in Northwestern Ontario, Northern Canada and in the Prairies. The treaties were also called the Land Cession or Post-Confederation Treaties. Treaty 1 is an agreement established 3 August 1871, between the Crown and various First Nations in southeastern Manitoba, including the Anishinaabe and the Swampy Cree tribes. Treaty 1 First Nations comprise the Brokenhead Ojibway, Fort Alexander (Sagkeeng), Long Plain, Peguis, Roseau River Anishinabe, Sandy Bay, and Swan Lake First Nations.

=== The Indian Act 1876 ===
The rights and freedoms of Canada's First Nations people have been governed by the Indian Act since its enactment in 1876 by the Parliament of Canada. The provisions of Section 91(24) of the Constitution Act, 1867, provided Canada's federal government exclusive authority to legislate in relation to "Indians and Lands Reserved for Indians".

Wikwemikong Unceded Reserve on Manitoulin Island is subject to the Indian Act provisions governing reserves even though its lands were never ceded to the Crown by treaty.

== Indian Act ==
The Indian Act gives the Minister of Crown–Indigenous Relations and Northern Affairs the right to "determine whether any purpose for which lands in a reserve are used is for the use and benefit of the band." Title to land within the reserve may be transferred to only the band or to individual band members. Reserve lands may not be seized legally, nor is the personal property of a band or a band member living on a reserve subject to "charge, pledge, mortgage, attachment, levy, seizure distress or execution in favour or at the instance of any person other than an Indian or a band".

=== Housing loans ===
While the act was intended to protect the Indian holdings, the limitations make it difficult for the reserves and their residents to obtain financing for development and construction, or renovation. To answer this need, Canada Mortgage and Housing Corporation (CMHC) has created an on-reserve housing loan program. Members of bands may enter into a trust agreement with CMHC, and lenders can receive loans to build or repair houses. In other programs, loans to residents of reserves are guaranteed by the federal government.

Provinces and municipalities may expropriate reserve land if specifically authorized by a provincial or federal law. Few reserves have any economic advantages, such as resource revenues. The revenues of those reserves that do are held in trust by the minister of Crown–Indigenous Relations and Northern Affairs Canada. Reserve lands and the personal property of bands and resident band members are exempt from all forms of taxation except local taxation.

Corporations owned by members of First Nations are not exempt, however. This exemption has allowed band members operating in proprietorships or partnerships to sell heavily taxed goods, such as cigarettes, on their reserves at prices considerably lower than those at stores off the reserves. Most reserves are self-governed, within the limits already described, under guidelines established by the Indian Act.

Due to treaty settlements, some Indian reserves are now incorporated as villages, such as Gitlaxt'aamiks, British Columbia, which like other Nisga'a reserves was relieved of that status by the Nisga'a Treaty. Similarly, the Indian reserves of the shíshálh Nation are now Indian government districts, the shíshálh Nation Government District.

== Public policy ==
Indian reserves play a very important role in public policy stakeholder consultations, particularly when reserves are located in areas that have valuable natural resources with potential for economic development. Beginning in the 1970s, First Nations gained "recognition of their constitutionally protected rights." First Nations' rights are protected by section 35 of the Constitution Act, 1982. By 2002, (Valiente) First Nations had already "finalised 14 comprehensive land claims and self-government agreements, with numerous others, primarily in northern Canada and British Columbia, at different stages of negotiations." Land claims and self-government agreements are "modern treaties" and therefore hold constitutional status.

=== CEPA 1999 ===
The Canadian Environmental Protection Act, 1999 (CEPA), "places aboriginal participation on par with federal ministers and the provinces in the National Advisory Committee." Among other things, CEPA clarified the term "aboriginal land" in 3 (1): "The definitions in this subsection apply in this Act. "aboriginal land" means (a) reserves, surrendered lands and any other lands that are set apart for the use and benefit of a band and that are subject to the Indian Act." Under sections 46–50 of the CEPA, the National Pollutant Release Inventory (NPRI) was initiated by Environment and Climate Change Canada. NPRI is the inventory of "pollutants released, disposed of and sent for recycling by facilities across the country". The NPRI is used by First Nation administrations on reserves, along with other research tools, to monitor pollution. For example, NPRI data showed the Aamjiwnaang First Nation in Sarnia, Ontario, was "ground zero for Ontario's heaviest load of air pollution."

== Water quality ==
By 21 December 2017, there were 67 long-term boil-water advisories that had been in effect for longer than a year. These are "public water systems managed by the federal government". There were also 18 communities that had "water issues for between two and 12 months."

According to statistics gathered by Health Canada and the First Nations Health Authority, in 2015, there were "162 drinking water advisories in 118 First Nation communities". In October 2015, Neskantaga First Nation reported that its "20-year boil-water advisory" was "the longest running drinking water advisory in Canada." Shoal Lake 40 First Nation was under an 18-year boil water advisory.

By 2006, nearly 100 Indian reserves had boil-water advisories and many others had substandard water. Ḵwiḵwa̱sut'inux̱w Ha̱xwa'mis First Nation, on Vancouver Island, had a boil-water advisory beginning in 1997. In October 2005, "high E. coli levels were found in the Kashechewan First Nation reserve's drinking water and chlorine levels had to be increased to 'shock' levels, causing skin problems and eventually resulting in an evacuation of hundreds of people from the reserve and costing approximately $16 million."

== See also ==
- Canada
  - Aboriginal land title in Canada
  - Block settlement
  - Indian settlement
  - Indigenous specific land claims in Canada
  - List of Indian reserves in Canada by population
  - Monarchy of Canada and the Indigenous peoples of Canada
  - Classification of municipalities in Quebec#Aboriginal local municipal units (Terres réservées aux Cris, Terres réservées aux Naskapis)
  - Nisga'a Final Agreement (Nisga'a land)
  - Tsawwassen Lands
  - Tla'amin Nation (Tla'amin Lands)
- Elsewhere
  - Aboriginal reserve (Australia)
  - Indian reservation (United States)
  - Lands inhabited by Indigenous peoples

== Notes and references ==
=== References ===
==== Citations ====
- DIAND (2003), Resolving Aboriginal Claims: a Practical Guide to Canadian Experiences (PDF), Ottawa, Ontario: Department of Indian Affairs and Northern Development, ISBN 0-662-35239-4, archived from the original (PDF) on 3 March 2016
- Government of Canada (1985). "Indian Act". Government of Canada.
- StatsCan (2011), Aboriginal Peoples in Canada: First Nations People, Métis and Inuit, Statistics Canada
- Government of Canada (1867). "Constitution Act, 1867".
- Robert, Jean-Claude (2001), Numbered Treaty Overview, Canada in the Making – Specific Events, Canadiana, archived from the original on 7 April 2015
- GC (23 June 1870), Rupert's Land and North-Western Territory Order, Government of Canada, archived from the original on 20 July 2011
- Clegg, Cindy (4 September 1982), Our Native Land: Making the Canadian Indian, CBC
- Henriques, Irene; Sadorsky, Perry (2004), Environmental Policy Tools and Firm Level Management Practices in Canada (PDF), Paris: OECD
- Colihan, Mary Ann (1 April 2008), Chemical valley: Aamjiwnaang First Nation in Sarnia sounds alarm over toxins, Aboriginal Canadians, CBC News
- CBC (9 November 2006), Kashechewan: Water crisis in Northern Ontario (PDF), Aboriginal Canadians, CBC

=== General references ===
- AANDC (1 October 2012), Terminology, Aboriginal Affairs and Northern Development Canada, archived from the original on 14 January 2013
- AANDC (28 May 2013), Indian Status, Aboriginal Affairs and Northern Development Canada
- AB (n.d.), Alberta Policy Glossary, First Nation, Métis, and Inuit Policy Framework, Government of Alberta, archived from the original on 27 September 2013
- BC (July 2010), Building Relationships with First Nations: Respecting Rights and Doing Good Business (PDF), Ministry of Aboriginal Relations and Reconciliation
- Berger, Thomas R. (1977), Northern Frontier, Northern Homeland: the Report of the Mackenzie Valley Pipeline Inquiry (PDF), Supply and Services Canada, ISBN 0-660-00775-4, archived from the original (PDF) on 31 July 2019
- Carlson, Keith Thor, ed. (2001). A Stó:lō-Coast Salish Historical Atlas. Vancouver, BC: Douglas & McIntyre. pp. 6–18. ISBN 1-55054-812-3.
- CBC (2001), Twenty-five years after the Berger pipeline inquiry
- Dickason, Olive Patricia (2009), David T. McNab (ed.), Canada's First Nations: a History of Founding Peoples from Earliest Times, University of Oxford Press, ISBN 978-0-19-542892-6
- Husky (n.d.), Community, Husky Energy
- INAC (February 2001), Words First: an Evolving Terminology Relating to Aboriginal Peoples in Canada (PDF), Ottawa, Ontario: Communications Branch at Indian and Northern Affairs Canada (INAC), ISBN 0-662-33143-5, archived from the original (PDF) on 29 September 2013
- MANA (n.d.), Manitoba's Aboriginal Community: Who are Manitoba's Aboriginal People?, Manitoba Aboriginal and Northern Affairs, archived from the original on 28 September 2013
- CRA (2013), Canada Revenue Agency, Government of Canada, archived from the original on 22 April 2016
- Ryerson (1998), Ryerson Journalism, archived from the original on 28 September 2013
- Ryerson (n.d.), Ryerson Journalism Diversity Watch, archived from the original on 27 September 2013
- SCS, Guidelines for Integrating Indian and Métis Content and Perspectives, Saskatoon Catholic Schools, archived from the original on 27 September 2013
- Shell (n.d.), Shell At a Glance Shell
- StatsCan (2011a), Tsinstikeptum 9, National Household Survey (NHS) Focus on Geography Series, Statistics Canada
- StatsCan (2012), High Level Indicators –Aboriginal Peoples Survey 2012 (PDF), 2012 Aboriginal Peoples Survey (APS), Statistics Canada
- Inclusive language guidelines, Vancouver, BC: University of British Columbia, n.d., archived from the original on 16 February 2014
