= Cape Breton County =

Cape Breton County Comté de Cap-Breton (French) Siorrachd Cheap Bhreatainn (Scottish Gaelic)
- County
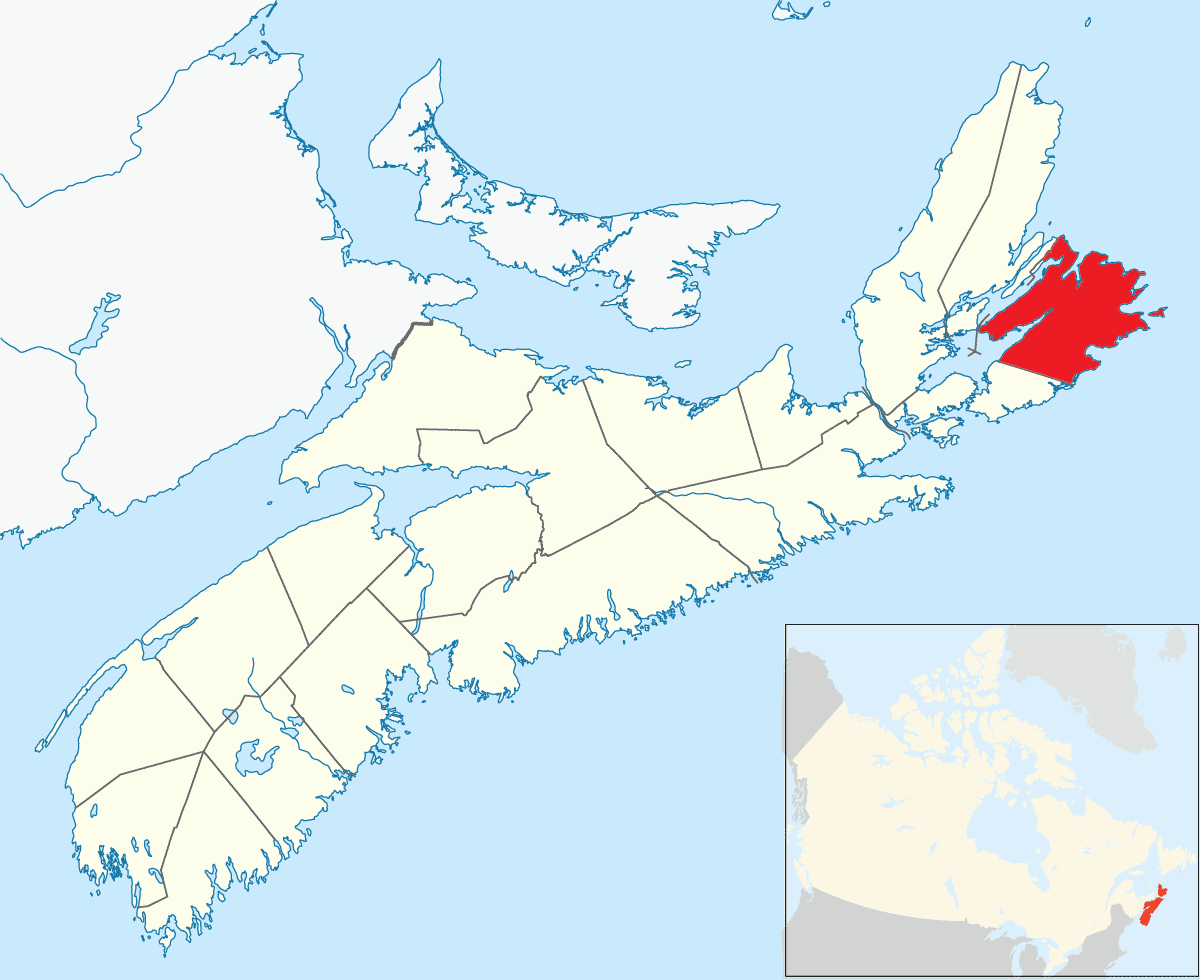
- Location of Cape Breton County, Nova Scotia
- Coordinates: 46.0°N 60.3°W
- Country: Canada
- Province: Nova Scotia
- Municipality: Cape Breton Regional Municipality
- Established: December 10, 1765
- Separated into Colony: 1784
- Reannexed to Nova Scotia: 1820
- Incorporated: April 17, 1879
- Amalgamated: August 1, 1995
- Electoral Districts Federal: Cape Breton—Canso / Sydney—Victoria
- Provincial: Cape Breton Centre / Cape Breton North / Cape Breton Nova / Cape Breton South / Cape Breton West / Glace Bay

Government
  - Mayor-Warden: Cecil Clarke
  - Council: Cape Breton Regional Council

Area
  - Total: 2,470.62 km^{2} (953.91 sq mi)

Population (2006)
  - Total: 109,330
  - Density: 44.3/km^{2} (115/sq mi)
- Time zone: UTC-4 (AST)
- Area code: 902
- Median Earnings*: $40,451
- Median household income, 2000 ($) (all households); Part of a series about Places in Nova Scotia

Cape Breton County is one of eighteen counties in the Canadian province of Nova Scotia. It is located on Cape Breton Island.

From 1879 to 1995, the area of the county excluded from towns and cities was incorporated as the Municipality of the County of Cape Breton to provide local government services. Since 1995 the only municipality in the county has been a single-tier municipality called Cape Breton Regional Municipality. For statistical purposes, the First Nations reserves of Eskasoni 3 and Membertou 28B are included in the county, but are separate entities.

== History ==
Taking its name from Cape Breton, the most easterly point of the island which was called after the Bretons of Brittany, the county has what is probably the oldest surviving European name to have been used to designate part of North America.

By proclamation of October 17, 1763 after termination of the Seven Years' War, Cape Breton Island was formally annexed to Nova Scotia. For a time thereafter Cape Breton Island was part of Halifax County. On December 10, 1765, Cape Breton Island was set apart as a separate county under the name Cape Breton County.

From 1784 to 1820, Cape Breton Island was established as a separate colony with a Lieutenant Governor and a nominated Executive Council, but without an elected house of assembly. Not until after Cape Breton Island was re-annexed to Nova Scotia in 1820 did it receive representation in an elected legislature.

Although subdivided into three districts in 1824, Cape Breton County was co-extensive with Cape Breton Island from 1820 to 1835 when the county was divided into three separate and distinct counties:

- Cape Breton (Northeastern District)
- Richmond (Southern District) later called Richmond County
- Juste au Corps (Northwest District) later called Inverness County

In 1851, Victoria County was formed out of the northeastern part of Cape Breton County and a year later, in 1852, the present boundaries of Cape Breton County were defined by the colonial government in Halifax.

== Demographics ==
As a census division in the 2021 Census of Population conducted by Statistics Canada, Cape Breton County had a population of 98,318 living in 43,799 of its 48,020 total private dwellings, a change of −0.4% from its 2016 population of 98,722. With a land area of 2,457.21 km^{2} (948.73 sq mi), it had a population density of 40.0/km^{2} (103.6/sq mi) in 2021.

== Transportation ==
=== Major highways ===
- Trunk 4
- Trunk 22
- Trunk 28
- Hwy 105 (TCH)
- Hwy 125
- Hwy 162
- Route 216
- Route 223
- Route 239
- Route 255
- Route 305
- Route 327

== Municipal government ==
Cape Breton County had several incorporated municipalities within its boundaries:

- City of Sydney (1904–1995)
- Town of Glace Bay (1901–1995)
- Town of New Waterford (1913–1995)
- Town of North Sydney (1885–1995)
- Town of Sydney Mines (1889–1995)
- Town of Louisbourg (1901–1995)
- Town of Dominion (1906–1995)
- Municipality of the County of Cape Breton (1879–1995)

In the early 1990s the provincial government began to examine duplication of municipal services in Nova Scotia. One of the recommendations arising from this study was that all of Cape Breton County be amalgamated. On August 1, 1995, all seven municipal units in the county were dissolved and replaced by a single tier municipality called the Cape Breton Regional Municipality (CBRM).

The new regional municipality's boundary included all of Cape Breton County except for the Eskasoni and Membertou First Nations.

Cape Breton County continues to exist as a county in Nova Scotia, but all municipal government and service delivery is provided by either the Cape Breton Regional Municipality or the First Nations, with no additional county level government or administration or any lower-level town or city-level government or administration.

== Communities ==
Regional municipalities

- Cape Breton Regional Municipality

Reserves

- Eskasoni 3
- Membertou 28B
