= Spanish Bay =

Spanish Bay can mean:

- Spanish Bay (Nova Scotia) - A bay in Nova Scotia, which includes Sydney Harbour, extending into the Cabot Strait
- The Links at Spanish Bay - a golf course at Pebble Beach
- The Inn at Spanish Bay - a resort at Pebble Beach
