= Nova Scotia Trunk 28 =

Highway in Nova Scotia, Canada

Trunk 28

Route information
- Maintained by Department of Transportation and Infrastructure Renewal
- Length: 35.6 km (22.1 mi)

Major junctions
- West end: Trunk 4 in Sydney
- East end: Trunk 4 / Route 255 in Glace Bay

Location
- Country: Canada
- Province: Nova Scotia

Highway system
- Provincial highways in Nova Scotia; 100-series
| ← Trunk 22 | → Trunk 30 |

Trunk 28 is part of the Canadian province of Nova Scotia's system of trunk highways. The route runs from Sydney to Glace Bay, a distance of 36 kilometres (22 mi).

From near downtown Sydney, Trunk 28 takes Victoria Road northward through the Whitney Pier neighbourhood, continuing along Sydney Harbour through South Bar, New Victoria and Victoria Mines to New Waterford. Trunk 28 turns south towards Lingan Bay, then east through Dominion entering Glace Bay in the Bridgeport area and following Main Street and terminating downtown at the intersection with Commercial Street.
