= Nova Scotia Route 239 =

Highway in Nova Scotia, Canada

Route 239

Route information
- Maintained by Nova Scotia Department of Transportation and Infrastructure Renewal
- Length: 14 km (8.7 mi)

Major junctions
- West end: Route 305 in North West Arm
- East end: Route 305 in Gibbon

Location
- Country: Canada
- Province: Nova Scotia
- Counties: Cape Breton Regional Municipality

Highway system
- Provincial highways in Nova Scotia; 100-series
| ← Route 236 | → Route 242 |

Route 239 is a collector road in the Canadian province of Nova Scotia.

It is located in the Cape Breton Regional Municipality and connects Gibbon at Route 305 with North West Arm at Route 305.

Local residents often refer to the road as the "Edwardsville Highway" or the "Westmount Road."

== Communities ==
- Gibbon
- Westmount
- Edwardsville
- Point Edward
- North West Arm

== Parks ==
- Petersfield Provincial Park

== See also ==
- List of Nova Scotia provincial highways
