= River Ryan =

River Ryan may refer to:

- River Ryan (baseball), a pitcher for the Los Angeles Dodgers
- River Ryan, Nova Scotia, a community in Nova Scotia
