= Low Point Lighthouse =

Lighthouse in Nova Scotia, Canada

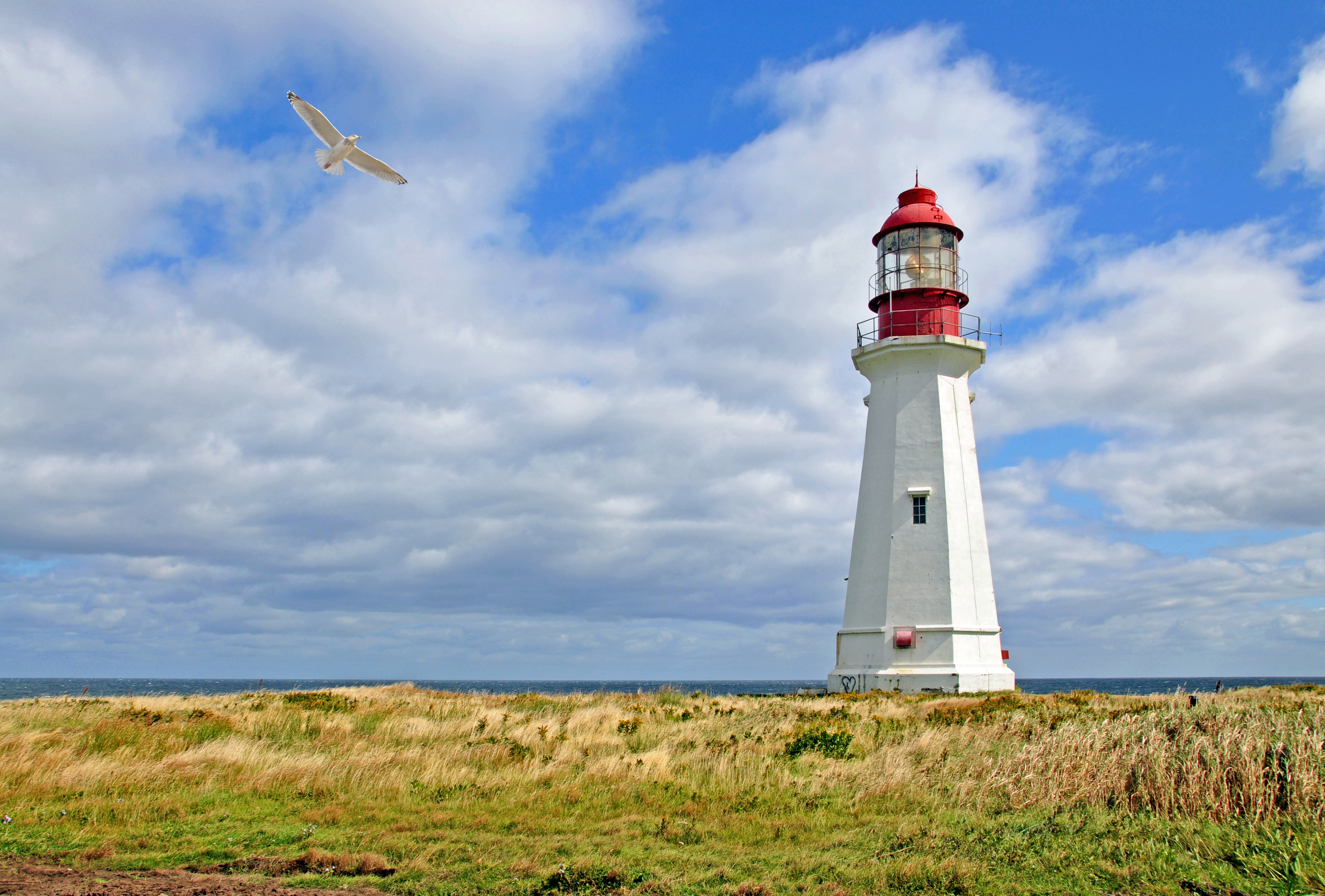
- Location: New Victoria, Nova Scotia
- Coordinates: 46°16′01.9″N 60°7′32.9″W

Tower
- Constructed: 1832 (first)
- Construction: concrete tower (current) wooden tower (first)
- Automated: 1988
- Height: 22 metres (72 ft)
- Shape: octagonal frustum tower with balcony and lantern
- Markings: white tower, red lantern
- Operator: Canadian Coast Guard
- Heritage: recognized federal heritage building of Canada
- Fog signal: automated horn, two three-second blasts every 60 seconds.

Light
- First lit: 1938 (current)
- Focal height: 26 metres (85 ft)
- Lens: third order double bullseye lens (original), rotating 36" DCB-36 optic aerobeacon (current)
- Range: 18 nautical miles (33 km; 21 mi)
- Characteristic: Fl W 5s. (flash 0.5 sec; eclipse 4.5 sec) Year round.

National Historic Site of Canada
- Official name: Light Tower, Sydney, Nova Scotia
- Type: Recognized Federal Heritage Building
- Designated: 19 October 2006
- Reference no.: 11247

Low Point Lighthouse (also known as 'Flat Point Lighthouse') is an historic Canadian lighthouse marking the eastern entrance to Sydney Harbour at New Victoria, Nova Scotia, near New Waterford, Nova Scotia. This is one of the earliest and most important light stations of Nova Scotia, one of the first dozen beacons in Nova Scotia to be lit to guide mariners, a classic red-and-white lighthouse still operated by the Canadian Coast Guard.

== The name ==
This lighthouse and station are located on low lying, flat point of land that thrusts over 0.6 kilometres (0.37 mi) out into Spanish Bay. The point has been called both Low Point and Flat Point since at least 1882. The Lighthouse and Lightstation have been entered into the official lists of lights under either name, and often both. Locally, both names are still in common use. The name was formerly approved as Flat Point on June 1, 1909. It was changed to Low Point on October 1, 1953.

== The first light ==
After 1826, the General Mining Association consolidated the various coal mines around Sydney Harbour and greatly increased the shipping of coal to ports on the Atlantic coast. In support of this effort, a lighthouse was built at Low Point in 1832 to aid vessels entering Sydney harbour. This first lighthouse was built at a cost of £770. The tower was octagonal, wooden, with its sides painted alternately red and white, 15.54 metres (51.0 ft) high, base to vane. During its first winter the lead roof was blown off in a heavy gale and the light was out until the lantern could be replaced with a new iron lantern. It was so exceedingly cold that the lightkeeper, Robert McNab, was forced to put pans of hot coals around the inside of the lantern to keep the light going; it was nearly impossible to keep up a flame from poor-grade oil when the temperature was minus −25 to −30 degrees Celsius (−13 to −22 degrees Fahrenheit). In 1856, McNab complained that there had been no repairs or improvements of any consequence in the 19 years of the light's operation. In particular, the tiny dwelling required considerable repair, and the light leading shipping into the increasingly busy Sydney Harbour was considered to be inadequate. New lamps were supplied immediately, which did improve the light, but it was another seven years before a new octagonal iron lantern was installed, providing the room necessary for larger oil burners and reflectors.

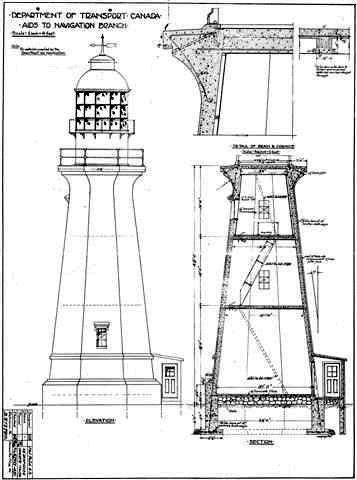
Low Point Lighthouse Plan

By 1878, it was again necessary to increase the size of the lantern; to accommodate it, the tower had to be strengthened structurally. A temporary light was fitted 4.87 metres (16.0 ft) below the lantern deck while new frames and knees were fitted under the gallery deck. The new iron lantern was 12 sided, 2.95 metres (9.7 ft)in diameter, and able to hold the new lighting apparatus of 13 burners, each with its own 40.6 centimetres (16.0 in) reflector. A light was first shown from the new lantern on July 13, 1878, and with all the buildings repaired and painted, the station was in first-rate order.

By 1881 Low Point was a signal station at which the International Code of Signals was in use and was one of two stations on Cape Breton Island of the Maritime Telegraph System . The Port War Signal Station was located at the Flat Point Lighthouse during WWI (1917 - 1918) and WWII.

In 1922 a third-order Fresnel double bullseye dioptric lens, group flashing white (5 sec.), manufactured in France by Barbier, Bénard et Turenne was installed. This replaced the 1857 fixed white, fountain lamp.

A steam foghorn was installed in 1903, followed by many alterations and additions over the years to the horn and lighting mechanisms as technology advanced. One of the more serious problems that plagued this station, as it did many others, was erosion. Through the years, upwards of half a million dollars was spent on building and maintaining the breastworks and cribbing.

== The lighthouse today ==
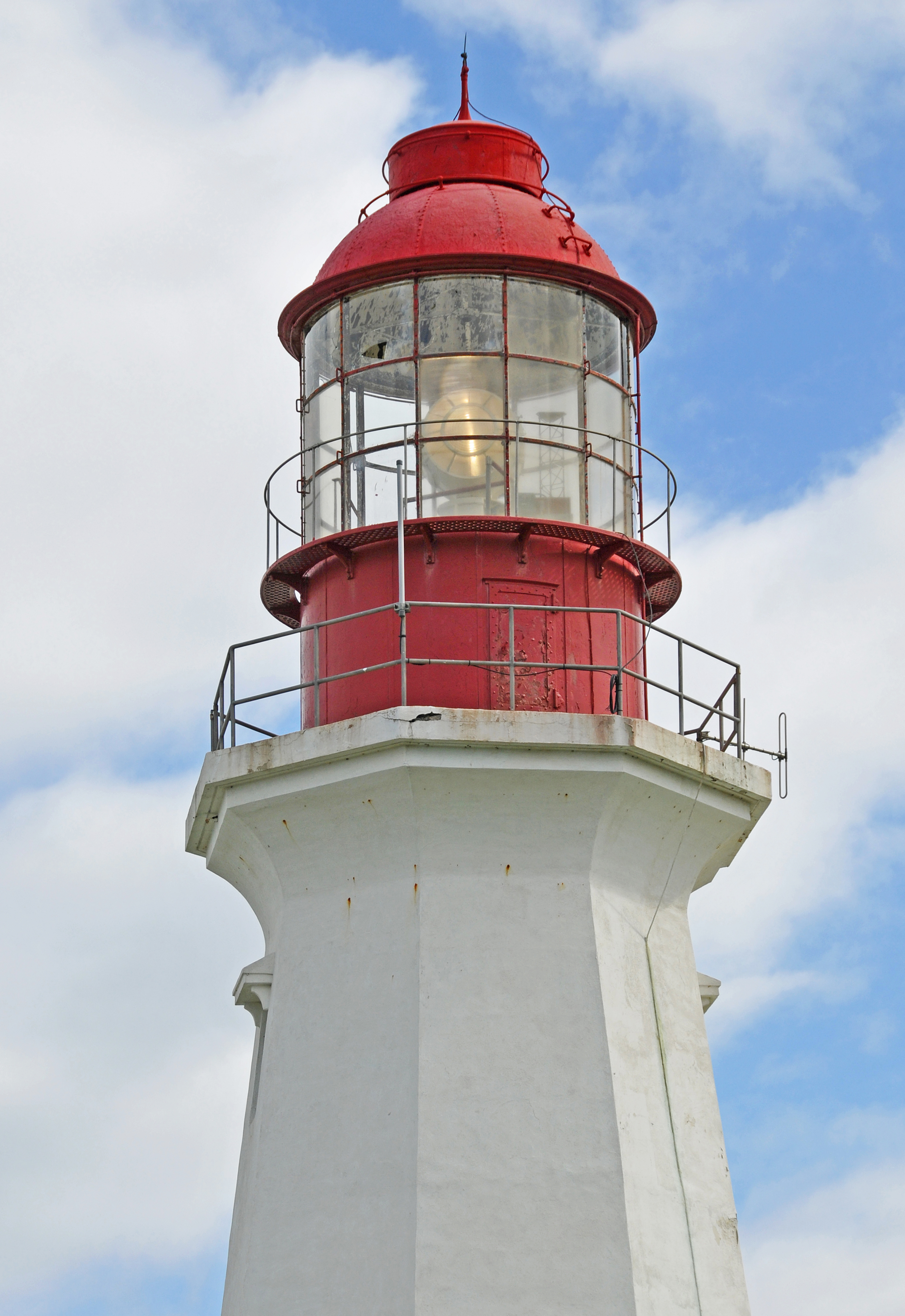
The round, iron, first-order lantern remains atop the lighthouse tower, the last classic lantern of this type still in use on an operational lighthouse in Nova Scotia.

In 1938, the wooden tower came to the end of its days and the existing tower was built in its place, a sturdy octagonal reinforced-concrete shaft, painted white and punctuated by a few rectangular openings. Tapered at its base, it flares outward at its top to support a railed platform surmounted by a red, dome-topped iron lantern, reusing the lens and lighting apparatus from the old tower, the circular iron lantern housing built by English builders of lenses and lanterns Chance Brothers.

In 1953, a new dwelling was built for an assistant keeper and electric power was brought to the station. By 1954, the station consisted of the lighthouse tower, fog-alarm building, stores building, oil stores, head keeper's dwelling, and the assistant keeper's dwelling. The old house was torn down, the materials used for general improvements around the station. In 1962, with the addition of a diaphone horn and associated machinery, a third lightkeeper was taken on and a third dwelling built to accommodate him and his family.

In 1970 an electronic horn was installed, eliminating the need for engines and compressors used with the diaphone horn-and the third keeper. His dwelling, now surplus, was sold and removed from the station in August 1977. Further downgraded to a one-person station in January 1979, the older two-storey dwelling was first converted to a survival station, then sold and removed in 1987. In the meantime, the third-order Fresnel lens was replaced in October 1984 by a DCB-36 optic, a 91.44 centimetres (36.00 in) diameter rotating airport beacon. The Fresnel lens is reported to be in storage at the Coast Guard base in Dartmouth. The round, iron, first-order lantern remains atop the lighthouse tower, the last classic lantern of this type still in use on an operational lighthouse in Nova Scotia.

The Low Point Lighthouse was destaffed in 1988 but the newest of the lightkeeper's houses remains onsite, one of the few lightstations to retain its keeper's home. The house has been restored and is in the care of a community non-profit group.

== Heritage designation ==
The light tower, an iconic landmark, is a Recognized Federal Heritage Building because of its historical associations, and its architectural and environmental values. It was designated 19 October 2006, and is listed in the Directory of Federal Heritage Designations. The designation is confined to the footprint of the building.

== An uncertain future ==
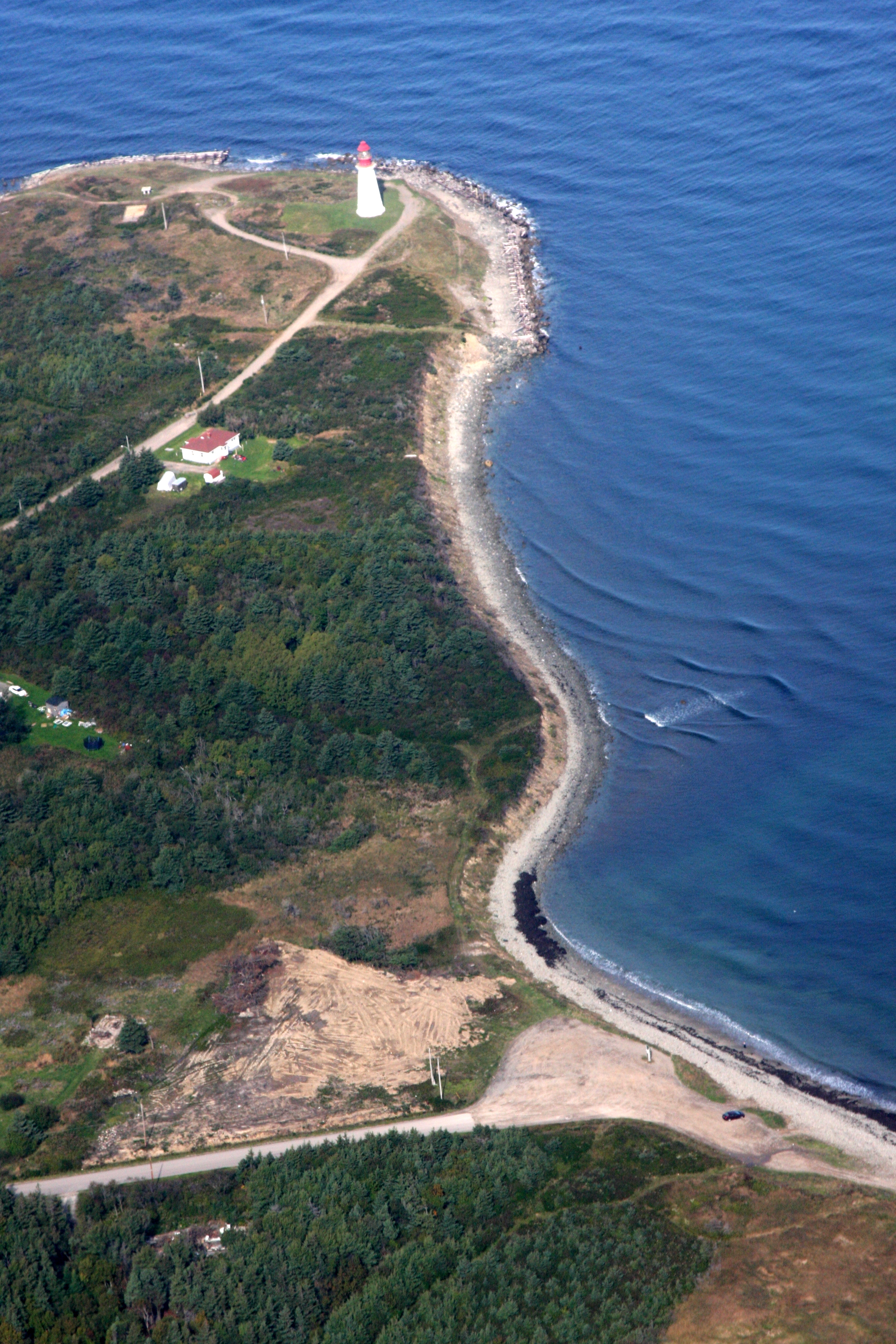
Low Point and Low Point Lighthouse, cir. 2016

=== Erosion ===
Coastal erosion is an ongoing issue at Low Point. Work to prevent shore erosion at the point was underway as far back as 1915, that year at a cost of $3,223.76. By 1917 repairs were already required to the erosion protection, at a further cost of $1,434.06.

By 2015 the lighthouse stood only about 20 metres (66 ft) away from the nearby cliff, partially protected by the remains of a crumbling wooden seawall. Erosion of the bank is visibly threatening the tower's foundation. Unless a new breakwater is installed, it is only a matter of time before this large, historic, octagonal concrete tower will topple into the sea.

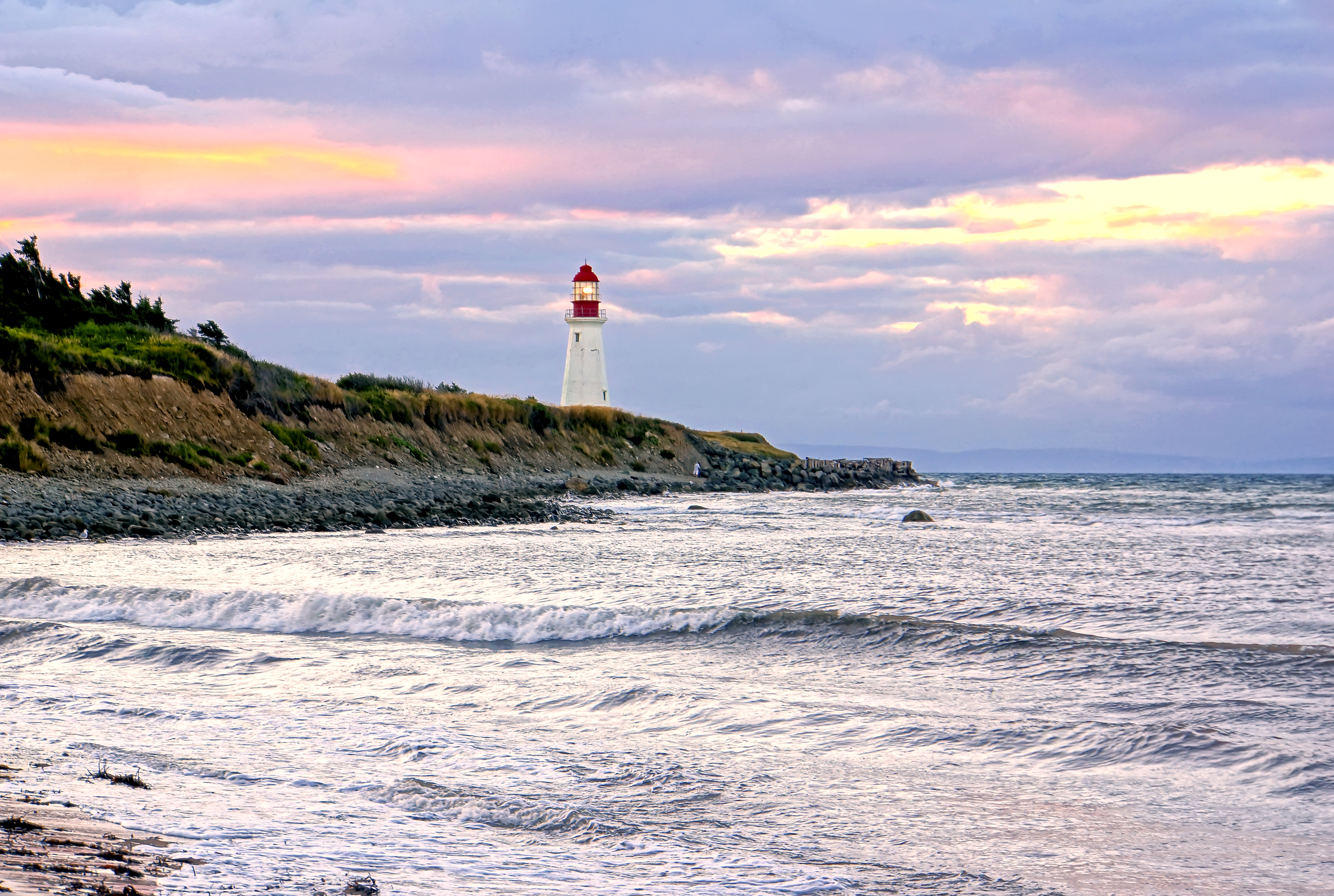
Low Point Lighthouse, a cultural heritage site in Canada, number 13966 in the Canadian Register of Historic Places.

=== Declared surplus ===
The Low Point Lighthouse was declared surplus by the Canadian Coast Guard in June 2010 (along with almost all lighthouses in Canada). As a result, the lighthouse had until May 29, 2012 to be nominated under the Heritage Lighthouse Protection Act by a group willing to look after it, or the lighthouse would face disposal. While still active, the lighthouse was declared surplus under the Heritage Lighthouse Protection Act as Canadian Coast Guard officials had determined Low Point Lighthouse could be replaced with a simpler structure whose operation and maintenance would be more cost-effective.

The Nova Scotia Lighthouse Preservation Society (NSLPS) made a number of lighthouse petitions in advance of the June 2010 deadline to make sure a request was submitted, while hoping some community group would then take on the responsibility. One of these applications was made for Low Point Lighthouse, although a NSLPS spokesman expressed fear that no one would take it on. Fisheries and Oceans Canada and Parks Canada had received requests from community groups for 26 Cape Breton lighthouses by the 2012 deadline but only seven made the June 1, 2013 deadline for the business plans that were the next step in the guidelines outlined in Canada's then new Heritage Lighthouse Protection Act.

=== Low Point Lighthouse Society ===
Debbie Lee Pearson, a director of the Low Point Lighthouse Society (formerly the New Victoria Lighthouse Society), submitted a business proposal in May 2013 for the Low Point Lighthouse.

In a Cape Breton Post article, dated April 14, 2014, Stephen Bornais, a communications officer with the Department of Fisheries and Oceans, said the department has received the business plan for the Low Point lighthouse:

"The preliminary assessment has been completed. The department has also received letters of support from the community. The department will be in contact with the community group in the near future with the next steps."

The Low Point Lighthouse Society was awarded $75,000 in July 2015, after it won an online voting competition set up by the National Trust for Canada and the Nova Scotia Lighthouse Preservation Society to award $250,000 to the top three vote-getting lighthouses in three categories.

The money will be used renovating the lighthouse and the site around it into a tourism destination, as a venue for weddings and other events. Low Point Lighthouse Society spokeswoman Debbie Lee Pearson in an interview stated that she expected the work to begin in the spring of 2016 and end before the summer season. The renos were actually only the first phase of the society's plan for the site. Taking into account Sydney's growing cruise ship industry, in the longer term the society wants also to establish the lighthouse as one of six or so stops on a new Cape Breton tourist trail that will reveal Sydney Harbour's history and heritage. The society is aiming to also add to the site signage, parking and interpretative panels as well as — in the longer-term — an RV park, campground, gift shop, café and picnic area.

"We see the lighthouse as a stop on a new Sydney Harbour tourist trail stretching from the Whitney Pier Historical Society Museum, past St. Alphonsus (gothic-style stone) Church in Victoria Mines, past Fort Petrie and the lighthouse in New Victoria, on to the Colliery Lands Park in New Waterford. Each stop has something unique to offer"

The province and Ottawa have co-funded both a $3,450 engineering assessment of the site's existing seawall and a $7,187 protection study of the nearby shoreline. The society estimates that rebuilding the seawall will cost approximately $400,000.

The fall of 2017 saw work begin on the lighthouse tower itself, with contractors chipping away loose exterior concrete, grinding away any and all cracks that are visible, and parging over these areas to prevent further damage from winter freeze thaw cycles. Work will continue in the spring after winter snow and ice clears, with a deadline of December 2018 for completion of the exterior refinishing.

== List of lighthouse keepers ==
Head Keeper:

- 1832–1833 George McKeagney
- 1833–1865 Robert McNab
- 1865–1910 John G. Peters
- 1910–1929 C.M. Peters
- 1929–1931 Clifford McGillivray
- 1931 – 1945 John A. McIntyre
- 1945 – 1948 Joseph W. "Willie Joe" Campbell
- 1948 – 1952 Theodore “Ted” G. Lohnes
- 1952 – 1970 James D. O’Neill
- 1970 – 1971 J.A. MacDonald
- 1971 – 1978 Melvin Tanner
- 1978 – 1988 James H. Jobe

Engineer:

- 1904 – 1912 Thomas O’Niel
- 1912 – 1935 Daniel Campbell

After 1988 the lighthouse was automated.

== See also ==
- List of lighthouses in Canada
