= Point Edward =

Point Edward may refer to:

- Point Edward, Ontario, Canada
- Point Edward, Nova Scotia, Canada
