= Tower Road =

Tower Road may refer to:

- Florida State Road 9336
- Tower Road (Malta)
- Tower Road, Nova Scotia
