= Nova Scotia Trunk 22 =

Highway in Nova Scotia, Canada

Trunk 22
- Mira Road
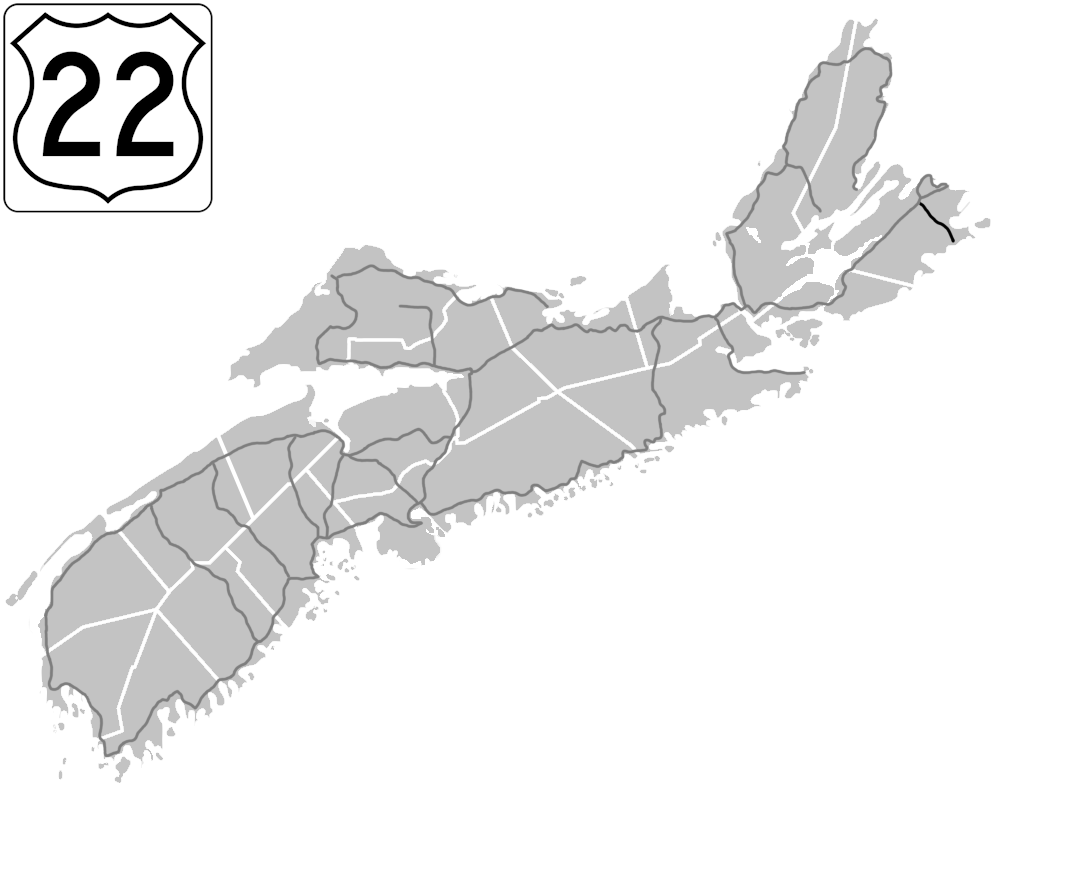

Route information
- Maintained by Department of Transportation and Infrastructure Renewal
- Length: 35.6 km (22.1 mi)

Major junctions
- North end: Trunk 4 in Sydney
- Hwy 125 in Sydney
- South end: Louisbourg

Location
- Country: Canada
- Province: Nova Scotia
- Municipalities: Cape Breton Regional Municipality

Highway system
- Provincial highways in Nova Scotia; 100-series
← Trunk 19	→ Trunk 28

Trunk 22 is part of the Canadian province of Nova Scotia's system of trunk highways. The route runs from Sydney to Louisbourg, a distance of 36 kilometres (22 mi).

Trunk 22, which leaves Sydney to the southeast on George Street, is known over most of its route as the Mira Road. The route crosses the Mira River at Albert Bridge.

== Major intersections ==
The entire route is located in Cape Breton Regional Municipality.

Location	km	mi	Destinations	Notes
Sydney	0.0	0.0	Prince Street (Trunk 4) – Sydney River, St. Peters, Glace Bay	Northern terminus; Trunk 22 follows George Street
Sydney	3.3	2.1	Hwy 125 to Hwy 105 (TCH) – Glace Bay, North Sydney, Baddeck	Hwy 125 exit 8
Hornes Road	15.6	9.7	Route 255 north – Mira Gut	
Albert Bridge	17.4	10.8	Crosses the Mira River	
Louisbourg	35.6	22.1	Fortress of Louisbourg National Historic Site	Southern terminus
1.000 mi = 1.609 km; 1.000 km = 0.621 mi
