= Sydney Harbour (disambiguation) =

Sydney Harbour can refer to:

- Port Jackson, the harbour of Sydney, Australia
- Sydney Harbour (Nova Scotia), the harbour of Sydney, Nova Scotia
