= CJIJ-FM =

Radio station in Membertou, Nova Scotia

Coordinates: 46°07′01″N 60°11′40″W

- Membertou, Nova Scotia; Canada
- Frequency: 99.9 MHz
- Branding: C99 FM

Programming
- Language: English
- Format: Rock

Ownership
- Owner: Membertou First Nation

History
- First air date: 2003
- Last air date: February 21, 2021

Technical information
- Class: LP
- ERP: vertical polarization only: 50 watts
- HAAT: 27 metres (89 ft)

CJIJ-FM (branded as C99 FM) was a Canadian radio station, broadcasting in FM stereo at a frequency of 99.9 MHz from Membertou, Nova Scotia, a First Nations community near Sydney. CJIJ played a variety of rock music.

The station received CRTC approval in 2002 and went on the air in 2003.

On January 29, 2021 Membertou Radio Association Inc. requested to the CRTC a voluntary revocation of their license, which was carried out on February 22, 2021.
