= Sydney River =

Sydney River Spanish River
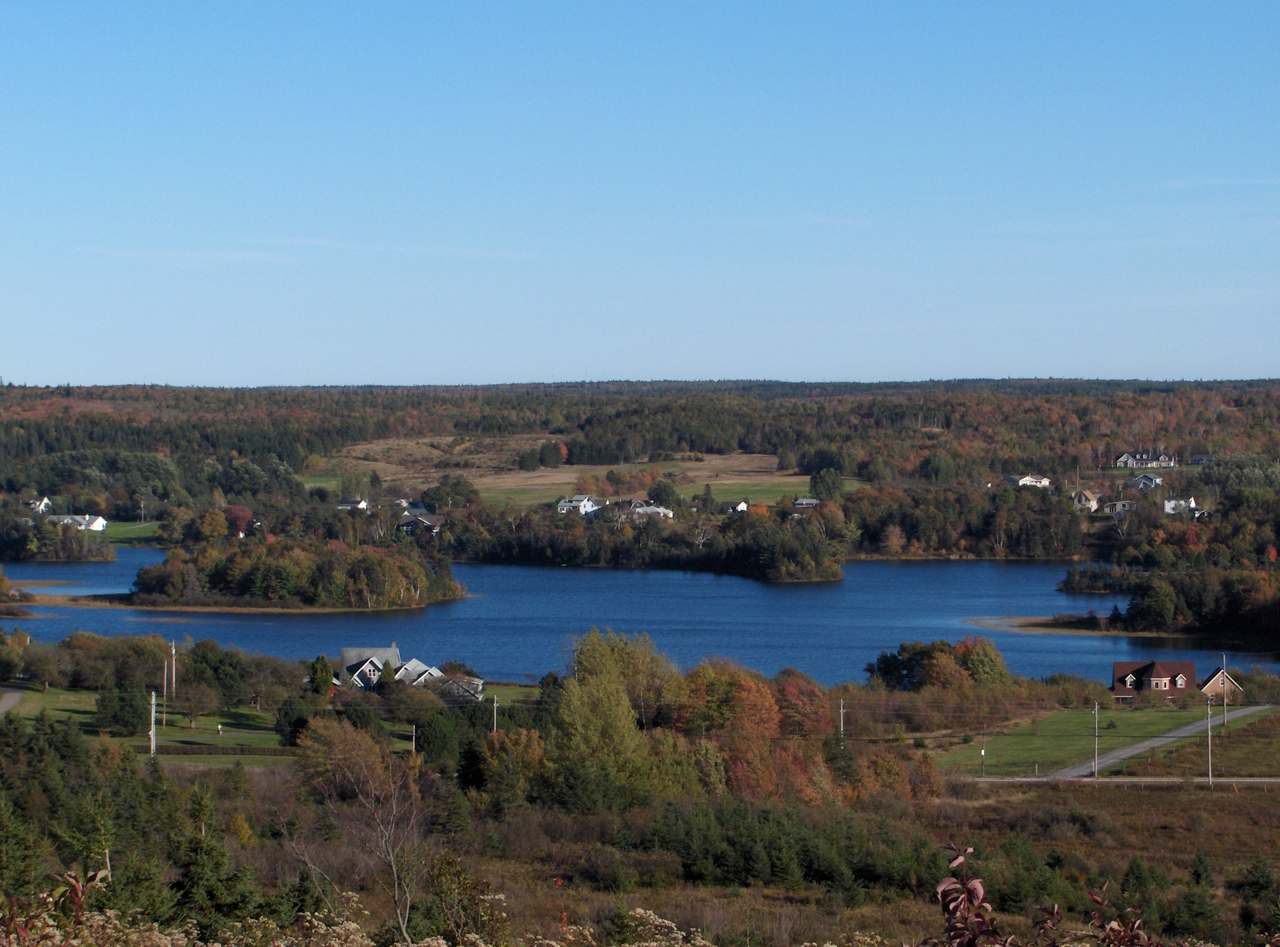
- Sydney River, with Coxheath in the foreground and Howie Centre on the opposite bank
- Etymology: From the city of Sydney on its estuary.

Location
- Country: Canada
- Province: Nova Scotia
- County: Cape Breton
- District: Cape Breton Regional Municipality
- City: Sydney

Physical characteristics
- Source: Blacketts Lake
- Mouth: South Arm of Sydney Harbour
  - location: between the Westmount shore near Amelia Point and Battery Point on the Sydney shore
  - coordinates: 46°8′49.4″N 60°13′36.3″W
  - elevation: 0 m (0 ft)
- Length: 12.5 km (7.8 mi)
- Basin size: 140 km^{2} (54 sq mi)

Basin features
- Tributaries
  - left: Crawleys Creek, Barachois Creek
  - right: Meadows Brook, Tobins Brook, Howies Brook, Gillis Brook, Prime Brook, Wentworth Creek, Muggah Creek
- Bridges: 125 Highway, Route 305
- Inland ports: Port of Sydney

The Sydney River is a short river located in Cape Breton County, Nova Scotia, Canada. Historically, it was also referred to as the Spanish River from the 18th century French name for its estuary, Baie d’Espagnols. It separates the communities of Coxheath and Westmount, on the north bank of the river, from Howie Centre, Sydney River, and Sydney on the south and east banks.

Sydney River rises in Blacketts Lake and runs 12.5 km (7.8 mi) to its mouth, between the Westmount shore near Amelia Point and Battery Point on the Sydney shore, at the South Arm of Sydney Harbour, draining a watershed of 140 km^{2} south of the crest of the Coxheath Hills. The river is an estuary for the last 7 km (4.3 mi) below the "Sysco Dam" in the community of Sydney River. The dam was constructed in 1902, converting the stretch of river immediately above the dam from a tidal estuary to a freshwater reservoir lake. Its watershed contains more than 2000 homes.

The Sydney River valley is glacial with thick deposits, kames, eskers and outwash gravels creating a series of shallow lakes connected by narrow channels. This low valley was a traditional canoe portage used by the Mi'kmaq for travelling between Sydney Harbour and the East Bay of Bras d'Or Lake. The river is one of only two Canadian watersheds with a known population of the yellow lampmussel. The lampmussel is found above the dam constructed in 1902, which increased the area of freshwater habitat suitable for lampmussel in the watershed.

== See also ==
- List of rivers of Nova Scotia
