= Leitches Creek =

Community in Nova Scotia, Canada

Coordinates: 46°9′5″N 60°20′51″W

Leitches Creek in Nova Scotia

Leitches Creek is a community in the Canadian province of Nova Scotia, located in the Cape Breton Regional Municipality on Cape Breton Island. It is located along a creek (and brook) of the same name which flows into the Northwest Arm of Sydney Harbour.

Reputably the stream was named by Adam Moore after a family of Lowland Scots people he helped settle here in the 1780s. Settlement probably began soon after 1783 although the land was not granted until the late 19th and early 20th centuries.

These early settlers were named 'Leech'. Early maps show the community as "Leech's Creek".

A Postal Way Office was established in July 1, 1864, with Samuel McDonald as keeper. One December 1, 1876 a Post Office was established with Alexander McDonald as Postmaster.

In 1956 the population of Leitches Creek was 340.
