= Ingram Ball =

Canadian politician

Ingram Ball (1752 – 18 March 1807) was British born and was an officer in the 33rd Regiment of Foot, and later in the 7th Light Dragoons of the British army, reaching a rank of captain-lieutenant before resigning in 1780.

Ball arrived in Cape Breton, Canada in 1788 with his wife and children and became involved in the government of the time. He was appointed to the Executive Council in 1789 by Lieutenant Governor William Macarmick. After 1795, Macarmick left the colony and Ball found himself in almost constant dispute with David Mathews, the new administrator. No legislative assembly was in place and governing was done by the Executive Council which Matthews controlled. He continued to have problems with succeeding administrations, ending up in jail at one point.

Ball died near Sydney, Nova Scotia. He was the elder brother of Sir Alexander John Ball, Captain, (later Admiral) of HMS Alexander at the Battle of the Nile and who became the first British governor of Malta.

== Legacy ==
- namesake of Balls Creek, Nova Scotia
