= South Bar =

Community in Nova Scotia, Canada

- Community
- Location in Nova Scotia
- Coordinates: 46°12′40.5″N 60°11′21.5″W

South Bar (formerly South Bar of Sydney River) is a community in the Canadian province of Nova Scotia, located near Sydney in Cape Breton Regional Municipality. It derives its name from the nearby Southeast Bar which extends over 1.7 kilometres (1.1 mi) out into Sydney Harbour, sheltering the community and its small fishing harbour from the open waters of Spanish Bay. The community's harbour is managed by the South Bar Fishermen's Harbour Authority. The local Fire Department, the South Bar Volunteer Fire Department, was established in 1982.
