= Caribou Marsh 29 =

Coordinates: 46°3′14″N 60°13′10″W

Caribou Marsh 29 in Nova Scotia
Caribou Marsh 29 (Canada)

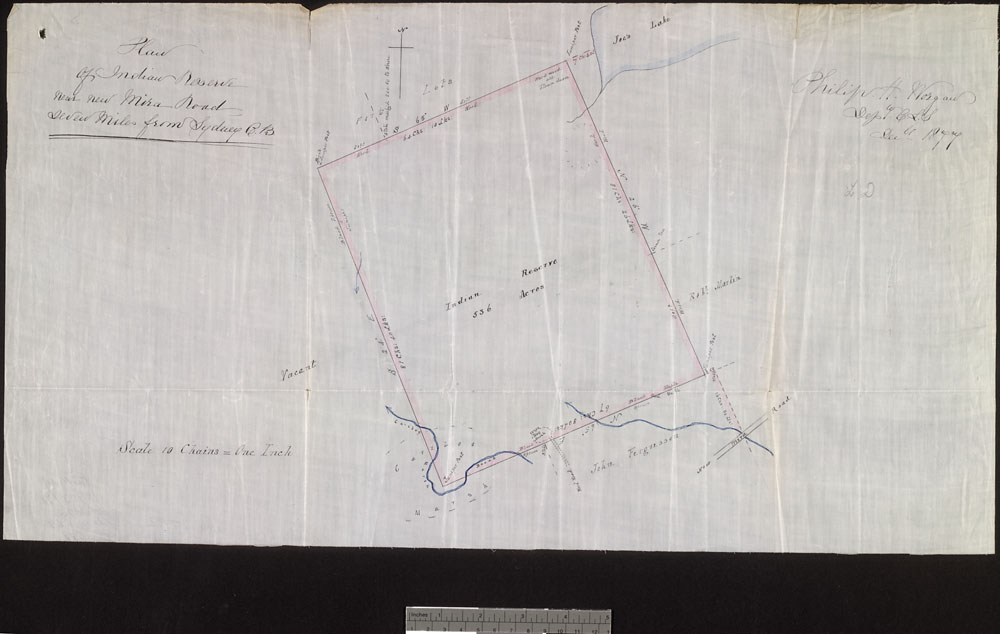
Caribou Marsh Reserve No. 29. Plan of Indian Reserve near new Mira Road seven miles from Sydney C.B.

Caribou Marsh 29 is a Mi'kmaq reserve in Cape Breton County, Nova Scotia, 8 kilometres (5.0 mi) southwest of Sydney.

It is an unpopulated reserve, encompassing 219.3 hectares (542 acres), and was established on 28 April 1882.

It is administratively part of the Membertou First Nation.
