= Lawrence Paul =

Lawrence Paul (June 29, 1925 – May 1, 2010) was a Canadian Mi'kmaq leader and First Nations activist. Paul served as the chief of the Membertou First Nation of Nova Scotia from 1967 to 1969. Paul also co-founded the Union of Nova Scotia Indians.

Paul was born on June 29, 1925, on Old Kings Road Reserve in Sydney, Nova Scotia. Paul served in the Canadian military during both World War II and the Korean War.

In 1967, Paul was elected for a two-year term as chief of the Membertou First Nation, which is based in the Cape Breton Regional Municipality of Nova Scotia. Most members of the Membertou First Nation lived without basic utilities, such as indoor plumbing, during Paul's tenure as chief. He worked to expose the Membertou's poor living conditions to the general public. Paul also cleared woodlands and upgrade facilities in and around the Membertou lands.

An advocate for First Nations, Paul co-founded an organization which became the Union of Nova Scotia Indians. He also worked to alleviate alcoholism among First Nations communities. He worked as a regional consultant on alcoholism prevention for the Canadian Department of National Health and Welfare. Paul also co-founded the Native Alcohol and Drug Abuse Counselling Association, and served as the association's executive director. Additionally, he established a series of anti-alcoholism programs, with offices in Prince Edward Island, New Brunswick and Boston, Massachusetts.

The University College of Cape Breton awarded Paul an honorary degree in 1996.

Lawrence Paul died on May 1, 2010, at Cape Breton Regional Hospital in Sydney, Nova Scotia, at the age of 84.
