= Sydney 28A =

Coordinates: 46°9′55″N 60°10′23″W

Sydney 28A in Nova Scotia

Sydney 28A is a Mi'kmaq reserve located in Cape Breton County, Nova Scotia, 1.6 kilometres (0.99 mi) NE of Sydney.

It is a small reserve, unpopulated, of only 5.1 Hectares, and was established on 7 September 1921.

It is administratively part of the Membertou First Nation.
