= Membertou First Nation =

First Nations reserve in Cape Breton, Nova Scotia, Canada

Coordinates: 46°6′53.84″N 60°11′25.44″W

The Membertou First Nation (Mi'kmawi'simk: Maupeltu) is a Mi'kmaq First Nation band government in the tribal district of Unama'ki, also known as Cape Breton Island, Nova Scotia. As of 2026, the Mi'kmaq population is 1004 on-Reserve, and approximately 662 off-Reserve. It operates a community radio station CJIJ-FM. Currently, Membertou has become the most well-off First Nation in Atlantic Canada.

== History ==
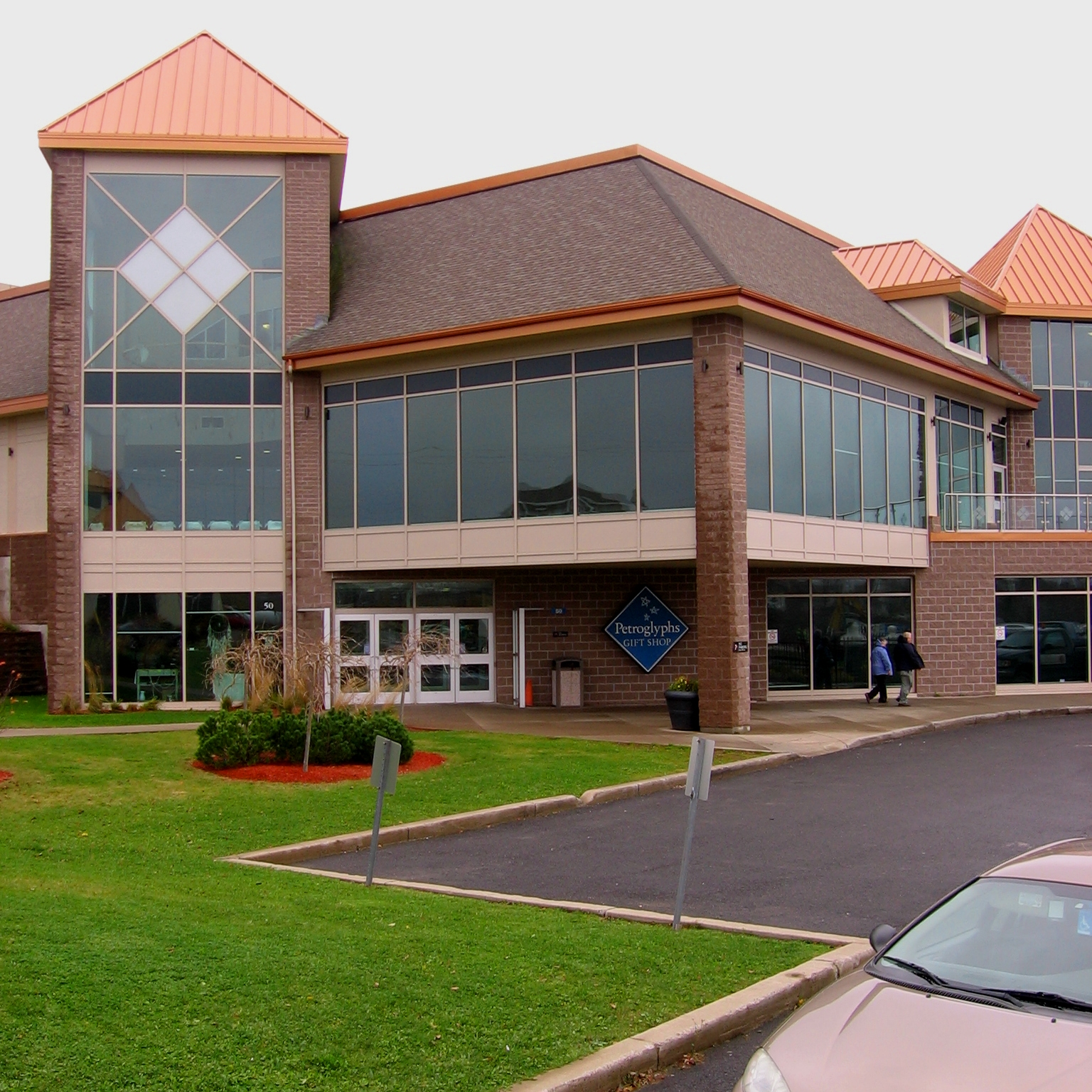
Membertou Convention Centre, Membertou First Nation, Sydney, Cape Breton.

Membertou is mostly an urban First Nation community. Named after the Grand Chief Henri Membertou (1510 AD-1611 AD) the Membertou First Nation belongs to the greater tribal group of the Mi'kmaq Nation.

Membertou was not always situated at its present location. Many years ago, Membertou (formally known as the Kings Road Reserve) was located just off of Kings Road, along the Sydney Harbour. In 1916, the Exchequer Court of Canada ordered the relocation of the 125 Mi’kmaq; the first time an aboriginal community had been legally forced through the courts to relocate in Canadian history. In 1926, the Membertou Community was officially moved to its present-day location in the vicinity of Mira Road, Nova Scotia.

Membertou First Nation has been successful in diversifying its economy, featuring a convention centre, gaming centre, gas bar, business centre, a hotel and other investments within the community. The Membertou Sports and Wellness Centre, which features a YMCA and two NHL-sized rinks opened in 2016.

In 2020, Membertou First Nation joined a coalition of Mi’kmaq First Nations that entered into an agreement with Premium Brands Holdings Corporation to acquire a 50% ownership stake in Clearwater Seafoods, one of North America's largest integrated seafood companies, in a transaction valued at approximately $1 billion. The deal, finalized in January 2021, included the transfer of Canadian fishing licences to the Mi’kmaq coalition and has been described as the largest investment in the seafood industry by any Indigenous group in Canada.

Currently, a business development called Seventh Exchange is being built across from the Highway 125 interchange. It will feature big box stores and light-commercial and retail development. It will be similar to Dartmouth Crossing in the Halifax Regional Municipality.

== Notable residents ==
- Lawrence Paul – former chief of the Membertou First Nation
- Donald Marshall, Jr. – noted Mi'kmaq activist
- Donald Marshall, Sr. – Former Grand Chief
- Glen Gould – Actor/Musician/Comedian
- Daniel Christmas – former senator
- Noel Doucette – former Chief of the Potlotek First Nation. Although he was the Chief of the neighbouring Chapel Island reserve, he was raised in Membertou and lived there until his late teens.
- Rita Joe – Mi'kmaq poet and songwriter
- Charlie Herney – member of the Mi’kmaq Grand Council for over 30 years. He served as the Putu's for 18 years (Putu's is an important role in the Mi'kmaq Grand Council).

== Composition ==
Membertou First Nation is composed of four parts as shown:

Community	Area	Location	Population	Date established
Caribou Marsh 29	219.3 hectares (542 acres)	8 km. southwest of Sydney	0	April 28, 1882
Malagawatch 4 (1/5 share)	661.3 hectares (1,634 acres)	62 km. southwest of Sydney	0	August 2, 1833
Membertou 28B	103.6 hectares (256 acres)	1.6 km. south of Sydney	1,103	August 31, 1925
Sydney 28A	5.1 hectares (13 acres)	1.6 km. northeast of Sydney	0	September 7, 1921
