= Membertou 28B =

First Nation reserve in Nova Scotia, Canada

Coordinates: 46°06′55″N 60°11′28″W

Membertou 28B in Nova Scotia

Membertou 28B is a Mi'kmaq reserve located in Cape Breton County, Nova Scotia.

It is administratively part of the Membertou First Nation.
