= Nova Scotia Route 255 =

Highway in Nova Scotia, Canada

Route 255

Route information
- Maintained by Nova Scotia Department of Transportation and Infrastructure Renewal
- Length: 35 km (22 mi)

Major junctions
- South end: Trunk 22 in Hornes Road
- North end: Trunk 28 in Glace Bay

Location
- Country: Canada
- Province: Nova Scotia

Highway system
- Provincial highways in Nova Scotia; 100-series
← Route 253	→ Route 256

Route 255 is a collector road in the Canadian province of Nova Scotia.

It is located in the Cape Breton Regional Municipality beginning in Glace Bay at Trunk 28 and continuing along Commercial Street through the downtown area then southeast on Brookside Street exiting the town. Route 255 continues through the communities of Port Caledonia (locally known as Big Glace Bay), Port Morien, Homeville, and Mira Gut, where it turns in a westward direction through Hornes Road to link with Trunk 22. Route 255 is part of the Marconi Trail which runs from Glace Bay to Louisbourg.

== Communities ==
- Glace Bay
- Port Morien
- Mira Gut
- Hornes Road

== Museums ==
- Cape Breton Miners Museum

== See also ==
- List of Nova Scotia provincial highways
