= Tower Road, Nova Scotia =

Community in Nova Scotia, Canada

Tower Road
- Designated place
- Location of Tower Road in
- Coordinates: 46.152036°N 59.959499°W
- Country: Canada
- Province: Nova Scotia
- Regional municipality: Cape Breton

Area (2021)
  - Land: 9.07 km^{2} (3.50 sq mi)

Population (2021)
  - Total: 295
- Time zone: UTC– 04:00 (AST)
  - Summer (DST): UTC– 03:00 (ADT)
- Area code: 902

Tower Road is an unincorporated community within the Cape Breton Regional Municipality in Nova Scotia, Canada. It is recognized as a designated place by Statistics Canada.

== Geography ==
Tower Road is 4 km (2.5 mi) south of Glace Bay on Marconi Towers Road, which is accessed from Route 255 via Sand Lake Road or Birch Grove Road.

== Demographics ==
In the 2021 Census of Population conducted by Statistics Canada, Tower Road had a population of 295 living in 128 of its 135 total private dwellings, a change of 8.5% from its 2016 population of 272. With a land area of 9.07 km^{2} (3.50 sq mi), it had a population density of 32.5/km^{2} (84.2/sq mi) in 2021.
