= New Victoria, Nova Scotia =

Community in Nova Scotia, Canada

Coordinates: 46°15′13″N 60°07′40″W

New Victoria in Nova Scotia

New Victoria (2001 pop.: 1,093) is a community in the Canadian province of Nova Scotia, located in Cape Breton Regional Municipality.

New Victoria is located west of New Waterford and east of Victoria Mines. It is approximately 10 kilometres north of Sydney.

It is a small, close-knit community which has a small church (St. Joseph's Church-Roman Catholic) and a lighthouse named the Low Point Lighthouse. New Victoria is also the site of Fort Petrie, a 20th-century fortification and observation post which functioned during both world wars. The fort is now a museum.
