= English Corner, Nova Scotia =

Designated place in Nova Scotia

English Corner
- Designated place
- Location of English Corner in
- Coordinates: 44.735713°N 63.792747°W
- Country: Canada
- Province: Nova Scotia
- Regional municipality: Halifax

Area (2021)
  - Land: 2.78 km^{2} (1.07 sq mi)

Population (2021)
  - Total: 1,058
- Time zone: UTC– 04:00 (AST)
  - Summer (DST): UTC– 03:00 (ADT)
- Area code: 902

English Corner is an unincorporated community within the Halifax Regional Municipality in Nova Scotia, Canada. It is recognized as a designated place by Statistics Canada.

== Geography ==
English Corner is at the intersection of Route 213 (Hammonds Plains Road) and Pockwock Road, approximately 20 km (12 mi) northwest of Downtown Halifax.

== Demographics ==
In the 2021 Census of Population conducted by Statistics Canada, English Corner had a population of 1,058 living in 368 of its 371 total private dwellings, a change of −8.1% from its 2016 population of 1,151. With a land area of 2.78 km^{2} (1.07 sq mi), it had a population density of 380.6/km^{2} (985.7/sq mi) in 2021.
