= Little Bras d'Or =

Community in Nova Scotia, Canada

Coordinates: 46°15′2.99″N 60°17′19.86″W

Little Bras d'Or in Nova Scotia

Little Bras d'Or is a community in the Canadian province of Nova Scotia, located in the Cape Breton Regional Municipality on Cape Breton County on Cape Breton Island.

== Demographics ==
In the 2021 Census of Population conducted by Statistics Canada, Little Bras D'Or had a population of 148 living in 64 of its 68 total private dwellings, a change of 9.6% from its 2016 population of 135. With a land area of 3.85 km^{2} (1.49 sq mi), it had a population density of 38.4/km^{2} (99.6/sq mi) in 2021.
