= Point Edward, Nova Scotia =

Community in Nova Scotia, Canada

Coordinates: 46°9′19.7″N 60°15′58.3″W

Point Edward in Nova Scotia

Point Edward (2001 pop.: 396) is a community in Nova Scotia's Cape Breton Regional Municipality located on the southwest shore of the North West Arm of Sydney Harbour, immediately north of the community of North West Arm, south of Edwardsville, and west of Westmount.

The town is named for King Edward VII. Point Edward is also the name of a headland extending into Sydney Harbour, bifurcating it into the North West Arm and the South Arm. This tip of this headland is located in Edwardsville.

== See also ==
- Royal eponyms in Canada
