= Alder Point =

Community in Nova Scotia, Canada

Coordinates: 46°18′28.97″N 60°17′7.5″W

Alder Point in Nova Scotia

Alder Point is an unincorporated community in the Canadian province of Nova Scotia, located in Cape Breton Regional Municipality. It derives its name from the nearby headland of the same name, Alder Point.

== Demographics ==
In the 2021 Census of Population conducted by Statistics Canada, Alder Point had a population of 461 living in 216 of its 234 total private dwellings, a change of -4.8% from its 2016 population of 484. With a land area of 5.14 km^{2} (1.98 sq mi), it had a population density of 89.7/km^{2} (232.3/sq mi) in 2021.
