= Sydney Harbour (Nova Scotia) =

Inlet near Sydney, Nova Scotia, Canada

- Mi'kmawi'simk: L'sipuktuk
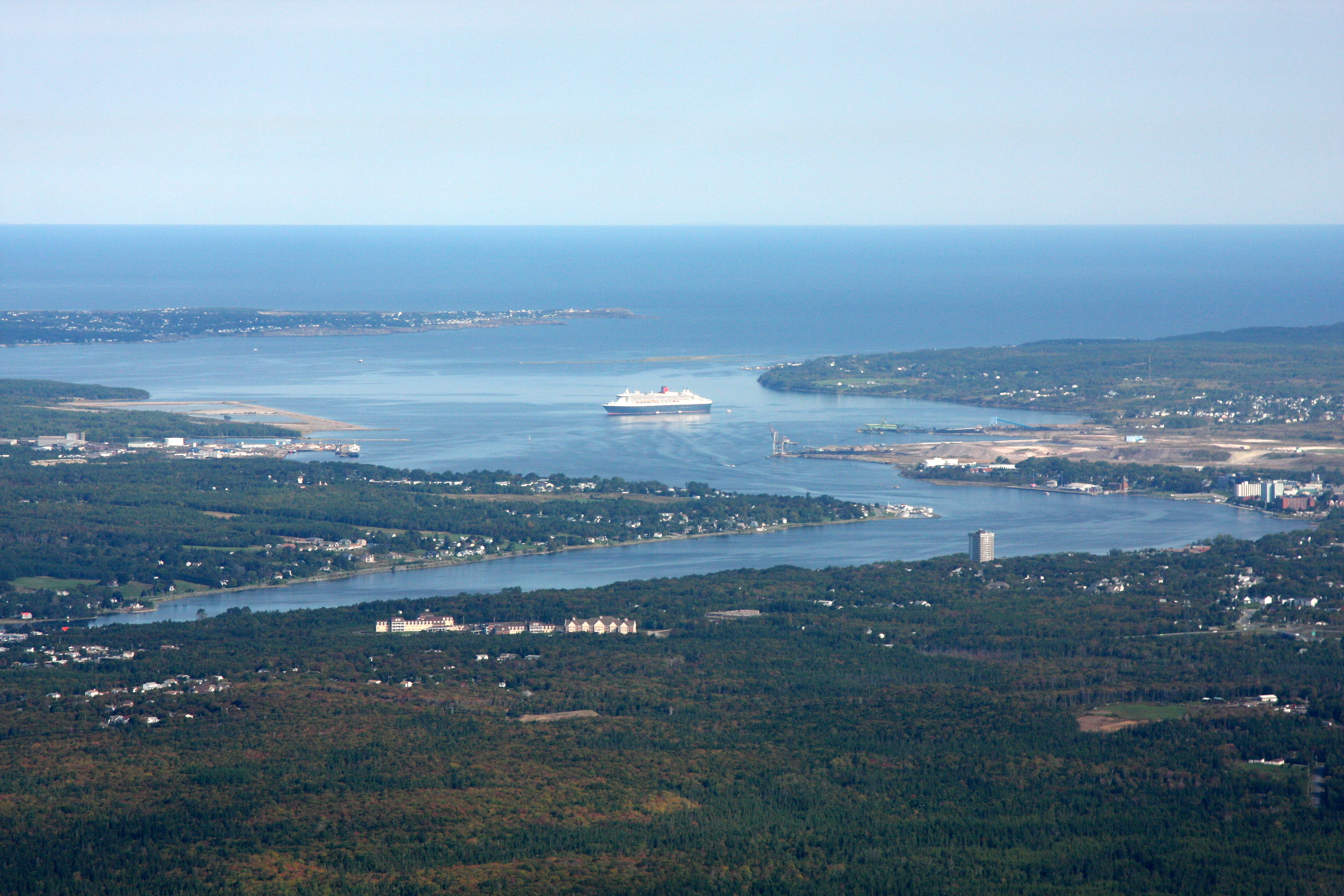
- Sydney Harbour aerial view looking towards the north-east. The RMS Queen Mary 2 lies in the harbour.

- Sydney Harbour in Nova Scotia
- Location: Cape Breton Island, Nova Scotia
- Coordinates: 46°13′12″N 60°12′20″W
- Type: Bay
- Part of: Spanish Bay
- River sources: Sydney River
- Ocean/sea sources: Gulf of Saint Lawrence, Atlantic Ocean
- Basin countries: Canada
- Settlements: Cape Breton Regional Municipality From west to east: Westmount; Sydney River; Sydney; Whitney Pier
- Website: www.sydneyport.ca
- References: Geographical Names of Canada - Sydney Harbour

Sydney Harbour (Mi'kmawi'simk: L'sipuktuk) is the 10-mile-long (16 km) Y-shaped inlet of the Atlantic, oriented southwest-northeast on the northeast shore of Cape Breton Island, Nova Scotia. At its upper reaches, the harbour forks to form two arms: the Northwest Arm and the South Arm. The South Arm is fed upstream by the Sydney River.

Sydney Harbour is the maritime hub for the Cape Breton Regional Municipality. The South Arm affords year-round, ice-free, deep-water anchorage for large ships, including cruise ships.

Before 1783, the body of water was known as Bahía de Espagnol, or Spanish Bay. It was then given its current name in honour of the Viscount Sydney. Lieutenant Governor of Cape Breton Island William Macarmick attempted in 1788 to name the harbour Prince William Henry Sound, after Prince William Henry (later King William IV), who was at the time serving in the Maritimes in command of HMS Andromeda. However, the name did not survive.

A cove on the north shore, between North Sydney and Sydney Mines, originally called Indian Cove and known locally as Barrington's Cove (after the family that owned adjacent property), was where Prince Edward (later King Edward VII) stepped ashore sometime between 28 July and 2 August 1860, (Note: Sources differ on the date, noting it as either 28 July, 30 July, or 2 August.) to visit the Sydney Mines while en route from St. John's, Newfoundland, to Halifax. The cove was subsequently named Prince of Wales Landing Place. Point Amelia was named for Princess Amelia, a daughter of George III.

The harbour's east shore formerly held a coke and steel mill belonging to the Sydney Steel Corporation, operating from 1901 to 2001, with peak production from 1960 through to 1980. Muggah Creek, near the steel mill, transported material (including polychlorinated biphenyl) into Sydney Harbour, resulting in the area around the mouth of the creek to have some of the most contaminated marine sediment known, as of 2003.

The harbour underwent major dredging in 2011, clearing the channel to a 17-metre (56 ft) depth and making it accessible to large container ships. Five port facilities currently operate on the shores of Sydney Harbour: the International Coal Pier, Nova Scotia Lands, Sydney Marine Terminal, Sydport Industrial Park (Edwardsville) and Marine Atlantic (North Sydney). The sixth, the new container terminal, NOVAPORTE™ Mega-Terminal, is being planned for Edwardsville.

== See also ==
- Royal eponyms in Canada—other locales in Canada named for royalty, similar to Prince of Wales Landing Place and Point Amelia on Sydney Harbour
