= Coxheath, Nova Scotia =

Community in Nova Scotia, Canada

Coxheath
- Coxheath in Nova Scotia
- Coordinates: 46°6′59.62″N 60°15′2.05″W
- Country: Canada
- Province: Nova Scotia
- Municipality: Cape Breton Regional Municipality
- First settled: 1790
- Founder: Captain William Cox

Population (2011)
  - Total: 2,333

Languages
  - English: 98.9%
  - French: 0.8%
- Time zone: UTC-4:00 (AST)
  - Summer (DST): UTC-3:00 (ADT)

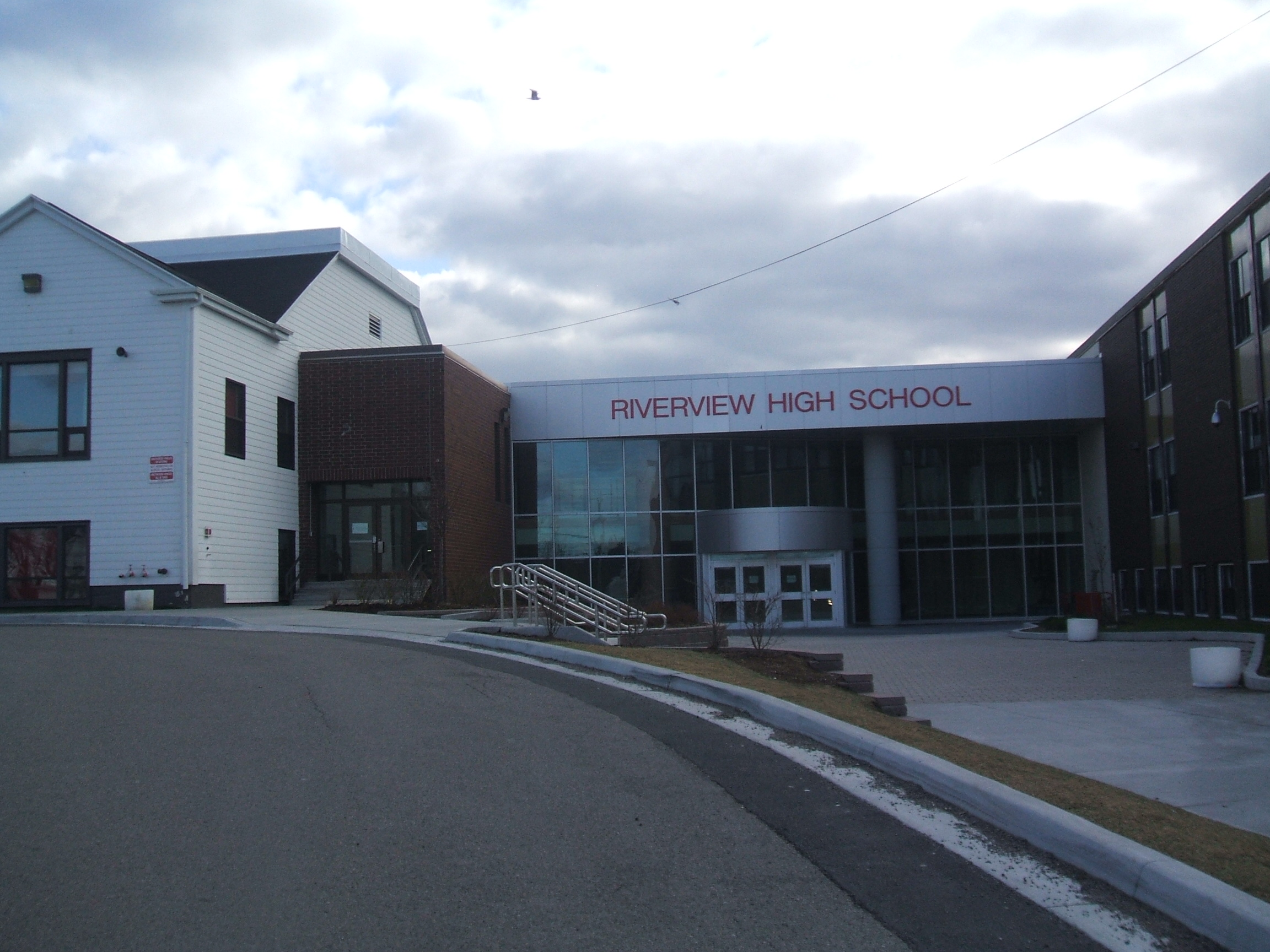
Riverview Rural High School, Coxheath, Nova Scotia.

Coxheath is a community in the Canadian province of Nova Scotia, located north of the Sydney River in the Cape Breton Regional Municipality on Cape Breton Island. The community is home to Riverview Rural High School, a secondary school with approximately 900 students in Grades 10-12 and Coxheath Elementary.

== History ==
After the fall of Louisbourg in 1758, Captain William Cox was left in charge of English soldiers in Sydney. In 1796 Cox obtained a grant of 1300 acres of farmland along the Spanish River where he had been living since 1790. English soldiers cleared the land, built a house, stable and barns. They then set up a grist mill and a road was built from his farm to the mill. Captain Cox lived on the farm with his wife and ran a successful grist mill and dairy farm. He named the land Cox's heath before returning to England in 1809.

James Boutilier from St. Margarets Bay, Nova Scotia ran a coal shipping business carrying coal from Sydney Mines to Halifax, Nova Scotia. He purchased Captain Cox's land for £300 in gold. Three brigantine ships sailed up Spanish River in May 1811 carrying the Boutilier, Lewis, and Andrews families, who settled in Coxheath. The grist mill was turned into a sawmill when wheat became difficult to grow. It was used in a ship building and repair business run by the Boutilier and Andrews families in the mid-1800s. Around 1850, several Scottish families began to settle near Blacketts Lake. By the turn of the 20th century, the original land of Captain Cox was divided into 25 separate farms. The farms provided the main supply of farm products for the residents of Sydney.

== Resources ==
Copper was reported in the Coxheath Hills north of the current Coxheath Road in 1875 by the Geological Survey of Canada. Underground copper mines were developed in the Coxheath Hills during two periods, from 1881–1889 and 1928–1930. These copper deposits are part of the Late Precambrian Coxheath Plutonic-Volcanic Belt underlying the Coxheath Hills and Spruce Brook. Molybdenum was discovered in the area by Mariner Mines Ltd. in 1964, and the system was subsequently described as a low-grade Cu-Mo-Au porphyry deposit.

In 2023 a report was posted by Nova Copper Inc to the resume earlier attempts to explore, re-open and plan to greatly expand the century-old copper mine for copper and other metals. An organization of Coxheath residents and volunteer supporters have taken notice and are working inform the public of these plans. Concerns surrounding the impact on the environment, water supply and infrastructure have been noted. The expanded scale of the newly proposed mining operation as well as significant growth and proximity of population are also key concerns. Efforts continue to echo the concerns to local and provincial government.
