= Balls Creek =

Community in Nova Scotia, Canada

Coordinates: 46°8′44″N 60°18′25″W

Balls Creek in Nova Scotia

Balls Creek (2004 pop.: 427) is a community in the Canadian province of Nova Scotia, located in the Cape Breton Regional Municipality on Cape Breton Island. It is located along a creek of the same name, both named after Ingram Ball who was given a grant bordering on the creek in 1795.

The first school in the community was built some time before 1875. The present school, built as a public school in 1957, is now the home of Munro Academy, a private religious school established in 2009.

A Postal Way Office was established in 1850. In 1956 the population was 342.
