= River Ryan, Nova Scotia =

Community in Nova Scotia, Canada

Coordinates: 46°13′26.07″N 60°5′14.52″W

River Ryan in Nova Scotia

River Ryan (population: 239) is a community in the Canadian province of Nova Scotia, located in the Cape Breton Regional Municipality on Cape Breton Island.

== Demographics ==
In the 2021 Census of Population conducted by Statistics Canada, River Ryan had a population of 239 living in 92 of its 96 total private dwellings, a change of 0.4% from its 2016 population of 238. With a land area of 4.73 km^{2} (1.83 sq mi), it had a population density of 50.5/km^{2} (130.9/sq mi) in 2021.
