= Blacketts Lake =

Lake in Nova Scotia, Canada

- Big Ridge in Nova Scotia
- Location: Cape Breton Regional Municipality, Nova Scotia
- Coordinates: 46°4′7″N 60°18′28″W
- Primary outflows: Sydney River
- Basin countries: Canada
- Surface area: 187 ha (460 acres)
- Max. depth: 25 m (82 ft)

Blacketts Lake is a lake and community in Cape Breton Regional Municipality, Nova Scotia, Canada. The town is in the Sydney River watershed, of which the lake forms the headwaters. The lake (and its tributary rivers) is home to the northernmost known population of Yellow lampmussel.

== Characteristics ==
The water in the upper Sydney River watershed is alkaline. The flow in Blacketts Lake is imperceptible except at a road bridge and causeway on Blacketts Lake Road. During winter, the lake tends to freeze except for areas of fast flow near the bridge and the mouths of brooks.

== History ==
Blacketts Lake is named after Walter Blackett. His father William, who was born in London, came to Canada with his wife and two sons in 1789, accompanied by a secretary of the British Government to purchase lumber for English shipyards. William Blackett was the founder of the nearby mining town of Glace Bay.

Walter Blackett moved from his father's homestead in Blackett's Creek on Prince Edward Island and established a homestead with his wife and nine children on the shores of Blacketts Lake.

== See also ==
- List of lakes in Nova Scotia
