= Upper North Sydney =

Community in Nova Scotia, Canada

Coordinates: 46°12′20.65″N 60°16′11.26″W

Upper North Sydney in Nova Scotia

Upper North Sydney is a community in the Canadian province of Nova Scotia, located in the Cape Breton Regional Municipality on Cape Breton Island.

== Demographics ==
In the 2021 Census of Population conducted by Statistics Canada, Upper North Sydney had a population of 387 living in 165 of its 182 total private dwellings, a change of -4.7% from its 2016 population of 406. With a land area of 11.18 km^{2} (4.32 sq mi), it had a population density of 34.6/km^{2} (89.7/sq mi) in 2021.
