= Little Pond, Nova Scotia =

Community in Nova Scotia, Canada

Coordinates: 46°17′13.82″N 60°16′9.41″W

Little Pond in Nova Scotia

Little Pond is a community in the Canadian province of Nova Scotia, located in the Cape Breton Regional Municipality on Cape Breton Island.

== Demographics ==
In the 2021 Census of Population conducted by Statistics Canada, Little Pond had a population of 169 living in 80 of its 89 total private dwellings, a change of -7.7% from its 2016 population of 183. With a land area of 4.35 km^{2} (1.68 sq mi), it had a population density of 38.9/km^{2} (100.6/sq mi) in 2021.
