= Hornes Road =

Locality in Nova Scotia, Canada

Coordinates: 46°2′50.04″N 60°1′51.34″W

Hornes Road in Nova Scotia

Hornes Road is a locality in the Canadian province of Nova Scotia, located in the Cape Breton Regional Municipality on Cape Breton Island. The area that became Hornes Road was originally land that was granted to Simeon Horne in November 1802, by Major General William Campbell, on behalf of the King of England.
