= North West Arm, Nova Scotia =

Community in Nova Scotia, Canada

Coordinates: 46°9′30.35″N 60°17′21.71″W

North West Arm in Nova Scotia

North West Arm is a community in the Canadian province of Nova Scotia, located in the Cape Breton Regional Municipality.
