= Florence, Nova Scotia =

Community in Nova Scotia, Canada

Coordinates: 46°16′39.56″N 60°15′50.51″W

Florence in Nova Scotia

Florence (2001 pop.: 1,684) is a community in the Canadian province of Nova Scotia, located in Cape Breton Regional Municipality. The community is located north of Highway 105 and west of Sydney Mines.

== History ==
The community of Florence was named after Florence M. McDonald, wife of Daniel Duncan McKenzie, Member of Parliament for North Cape Breton and Victoria. He became interim Liberal leader upon the death of Sir Wilfrid Laurier in 1919, "ascending higher on the political pyramid than any other Cape Bretoner before or since." Subsequently, he was Solicitor General in Mackenzie King's first cabinet and in 1923 was appointed to the bench of the Supreme Court of Nova Scotia. In 1910 it was home to a large co-operative store located on Florence Corner. In 1950 Florence had its first little league team and was home to the Florence Coal Dusters in the 1970s. On June 11, 1951, a credit union opened on Pitt Street pioneered by George Walker, Jerry Rendell, and William O'Toole.

=== Mining ===
Florence Colliery was operated by the Nova Scotia Steel & Coal Company from 1902 to 1961. The Nova Scotia Steel & Coal Company opened No 4 Colliery in 1907 8000 feet west of Florence Colliery and operated it until 1921. The Franklin Mine was opened in 1946 where there was a coal washing plant. In 1911, Florence was home to a boarding house called Acadia House for local coal miners working at the colliery.
