= Victoria Mines, Nova Scotia =

Community in Nova Scotia, Canada

Coordinates: 46°14′40.88″N 60°9′30.19″W

Victoria Mines in Nova Scotia

Victoria Mines is a community in the Canadian province of Nova Scotia, located in the Cape Breton Regional Municipality on Cape Breton Island.

The first land grants in Victoria Mines were given to Irish settlers in 1794 and in New Victoria in 1808.

Coal mining in the area began in 1865 with what we now call the Old Victoria Mine, which was likely the first mine in North America planned to be completely under the sea floor. It was based on the shore just north of the intersection of the New Waterford Highway (#28) and Lake Road (circled in red on the map below). The coal from this mine was conveyed by a railway 5.5 kilometres long to the Victoria Pier at South Bar for shipment.

The mine’s two slopes (decline tunnels) were abandoned in 1870 due to water inflow problems and a new set of slopes were opened 250 metres to the northeast, again right along the shore – which was an unfortunate mistake to make once, never mind twice. Being so close to the shore did not leave enough rock cover between the subsea tunnels and the ocean floor above. This allowed sea water to enter the mine through faults or other structural features of the geology.

The mine closed in 1878 after having more water issues and a boiler explosion killed three workers. It produced a total of 820,411 tons of coal.

The New Victoria Mine was opened by the General Mining Association in 1883 about two kilometres northeast of the Old Victoria Mine (circled in green). Both mines were called Victoria Mine when they opened but they were subsequently referred to as “New” and “Old” to distinguish between them.

The new mine caused both population and economic activity to shift from Victoria Mines to the immediate area around the new mine. The Old Victoria Mine’s rail line was extended to the New Victoria Mine so it could also send its coal to South Bar for shipping. The New Waterford Highway is said to follow the path of the old rail bed.

The mine was sold to the Dominion Coal Company in 1894 and closed in 1897 due to rock fall issues. It was dewatered in 1913 and reopened in 1914 under a new name: Dominion No. 17 Colliery. However, it closed that same year, reportedly due to a lack of miners during WWI.

In 1918, No. 17 Colliery was pumped out and kept open until 1921, when it closed again on July 15. The colliery had produced an estimated 5,183,000 tons of coal.

A new mine, Dominion No. 18, opened in New Victoria in 1938 about 1.5 kilometres to the east of the No. 17 on Daley Road (circled in purple). No. 18 worked the Phalen coal seam until 1946, producing 1,531,320 tons. In 1946 a tunnel was driven from No. 18’s workings into the Harbour Seam, which lies over the Phalen Seam in that area.

In 1948, the No. 17 Colliery workings were pumped out and production in No. 17 started again in February 1950. No. 17 and 18 tunnels were now linked underground and coal from No. 17 was removed via No. 18’s slopes. Production continued until 1966 when both 17 and 18 closed.

In 1962 an airway was completed due West of Lamey’s Lane in New Victoria to service the eastern portion of the Princess Colliery whose main shafts were approximately 6 kilometres to the west, the other side of Sydney Harbour, at Cranberry Head in Sydney Mines. The site was abandoned when the Princess mine closed in 1975.

Victoria Mines and New Victoria are part of what was originally called Low Point by early settlers - the entire point from Sydney Harbour to Lingan.

The increase in coal exports after the General Mining Association got a monopoly on mineral rights in Nova Scotia in 1826 made it important to mark the entrance to Sydney harbour to keep ships safe. The first Low Point Lighthouse, in New Victoria at the mouth of Sydney harbour, was built in 1832. It was wooden with a lead roof. The wooden tower was replaced in 1938 with the concrete tower that stands at the site today.
