= Westmount, Nova Scotia =

Community in Nova Scotia, Canada

Coordinates: 46°8′27.3″N 60°12′36.7″W

Westmount
- Interactive map of Westmount
- Country: Canada
- Province: Nova Scotia
- Municipality: Cape Breton Regional Municipality

Population (2001: From Statistics Canada)
  - Total: 3,000
- Time zone: UTC-4 (AST)
  - Summer (DST): UTC-3 (ADT)
- Area code: 902

Westmount (2001 pop.: 3,000) is a community in the Canadian province of Nova Scotia, located in Cape Breton Regional Municipality.

== Geography ==
Located on the west bank of the Sydney River at the point where Sydney Harbour begins, Westmount faces Sydney's downtown. Neighbouring communities include Point Edward, Coxheath and Edwardsville.

== Government ==
As part of the CBRM, Westmount is represented by the municipal councilor for District 4, Steve Gillespie. Westmount is also represented by Jaime Battiste in the federal riding of Sydney-Victoria, and by Murray Ryan in the provincial riding of Northside-Westmount

== Amenities and places of interest ==
Westmount is home to Petersfield Provincial Park. The park was formerly a private family estate and home to the 18th century Mayor of New York City, David Mathews and later the industrialist and Senator, John Stewart McLennan. The grounds have been designated as a historical property and are home to the ruins of a large manor house and caretaker's home. Canada Day festivities are held at the park every year. The only building from the former estate that still stands is the boathouse, which was moved approx. 1 km down shore from the estate, and converted to a private residence.

== Notable people ==
People of note who live or have lived in Westmount include:

- Howie MacDonald, Cape Breton fiddler, Conservative candidate for the Sydney—Victoria district, during the 2004 and 2006 federal elections
- Peter Mancini, politician, lawyer, MP for Sydney—Victoria (1997–2000)
- David Mathews, British Loyalist who was active during the American Revolution, Mayor of New York City (1776–1783)
- John Stewart McLennan, industrialist, publisher and politician.
- John W. Morgan, politician, Mayor of the Cape Breton Regional Municipality (2000–2012)
- John Newell, politician, MLA for Cape Breton The Lakes (1983–1988)
