= Sydney River, Nova Scotia =

Community in Nova Scotia, Canada

Sydney River
- Unincorporated community
- Location within Nova Scotia Location within Canada
- Coordinates: 46°06′13″N 60°13′44″W
- Country: Canada
- Province: Nova Scotia
- Regional municipality: Cape Breton Regional Municipality
- Time zone: UTC−04:00 (AST)
  - Summer (DST): UTC−03:00 (ADT)
- GNBC Code: CBLHF

Sydney River is an unincorporated community in the Canadian province of Nova Scotia, located in Cape Breton Regional Municipality. The population in 2021 was 455.

== History ==
In 1992, three employees were murdered and one permanently disabled during the Sydney River McDonald's murders.

== Geography ==
The community is located at the southern end of Sydney Harbour's South Arm at the mouth of the Sydney River. The community is at the interchange between Highway 125 and Trunk 4. The river the connects Westmount and Coxheath goes between the bridge leading into Sydney River. This bridge had a makeover in 2012 and finished up in 2014, demolishing the famous green pillers which caused a uproar in the neighbouring communities

== Demographics ==
In the 2021 Census of Population conducted by Statistics Canada, Sydney River had a population of 455 living in 170 of its 176 total private dwellings, a change of 24% from its 2016 population of 367. With a land area of 6.68 km^{2} (2.58 sq mi), it had a population density of 68.1/km^{2} (176.4/sq mi) in 2021.

== Government ==
Sydney River is represented on Cape Breton Regional Council by Steve Gillespie, District 4 councillor.

== Infrastructure ==
Bus service is provided by Transit Cape Breton.

Sydney River has a volunteer fire department.

== Education ==
Sydney River Elementary School, a primary to grade five school, is located here.
