= Edwardsville, Nova Scotia =

Community in Canada

Coordinates: 46°10′0.74″N 60°14′7.66″W

Edwardsville in Nova Scotia

Edwardsville is a community in the Canadian province of Nova Scotia, located in the Cape Breton Regional Municipality on Cape Breton Island. It is named for King Edward VII.

== Demographics ==
In the 2021 Census of Population conducted by Statistics Canada, Edwardsville had a population of 287 living in 119 of its 127 total private dwellings, a change of 7.5% from its 2016 population of 267. With a land area of 8.08 km^{2} (3.12 sq mi), it had a population density of 35.5/km^{2} (92.0/sq mi) in 2021.

== See also ==
- Royal eponyms in Canada
