= Greenlink Rotary Park Trail System =

Urban park in Sydney, Nova Scotia, Canada

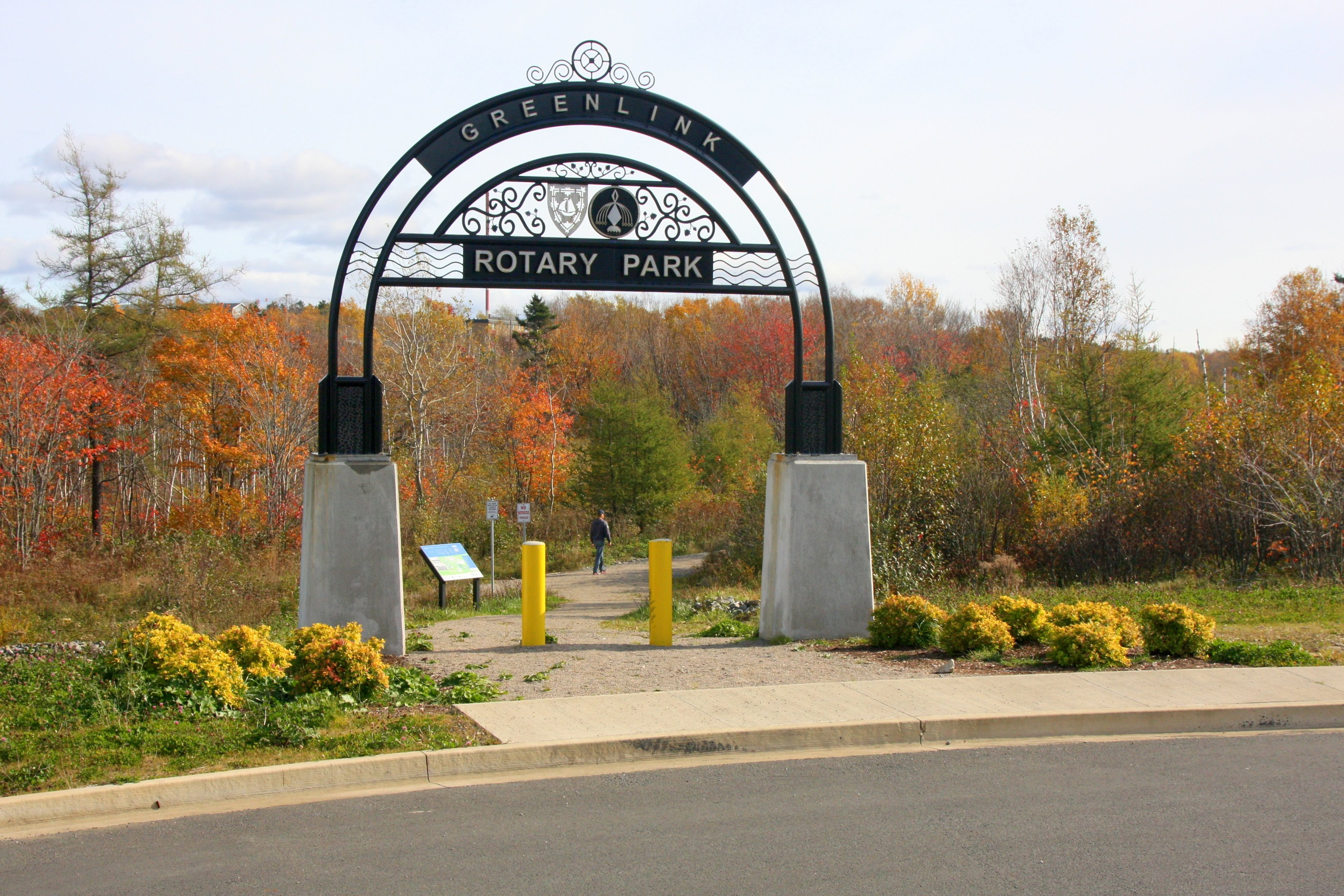
- Maillard Street Entrance
- Interactive map of Greenlink Rotary Park Trail System
- Type: Municipal Urban Park
- Location: Cape Breton Island, Nova Scotia, Canada
- Nearest town: Sydney
- Coordinates: 46°07′18″N 60°10′55″W
- Area: 52 acres (21 ha)
- Created: 15 August 1956; 69 years ago
- Operator: Cape Breton Regional Municipality, Parks & Grounds
- Status: Operational
- Hiking trails: Greenlink Trails
- Public transit: Transit Cape Breton Route 13
- Website: Rotary Park

Greenlink Rotary Park Trail System is a Canadian urban park located in the community of Sydney, part of Nova Scotia's Cape Breton Regional Municipality. The park incorporates the Greenlink Trail System, the Rotary Park Off Leash Park, as well as a disc golf course. Much of the park is forested, with ponds, a stone dam, and streams in the valleys; a few acres are open lawn area, suitable for informal recreation. The park encompass 52 acres (21 ha) within the former city's boundaries.

The trail system connects Sydney's Shipyard and South End neighbourhoods to Membertou First Nation and the Cape Breton Regional Hospital. Two of the trails progress from Shandwick Street and the St. Anthony Daniel Ball Park, with both trails converging with the trail from Rotary Drive, crossing Churchill Drive, and extending to the Cape Breton Regional Hospital property.

== Park features ==
=== Trails ===
The Greenlink Trail System is a series of 2.5 to 3 metres (8 to 10 ft) wide crushed limestone paths suitable for walkers and cyclists. The gravel surfaces are not suitable for wheelchairs or strollers. The paths meander through a scenic natural area bordering Wentworth Creek (now Reservoir Brook, also known as Sullivan's Brook) and a historic water reservoir with a stone dam and waterfall. The paths are not illuminated at night. Benches have been provided along the paths for resting, signs and interpretive displays for information.

The trail system is approximately 3 kilometres (1.9 mi) in length, with some longer routes such as Shandwick St. to the Regional Hospital or St. Anthony Daniel Ball Field to the Hospital both at 2.2 kilometres (1.4 mi) one way. Parking lots are located at the Rotary Drive and Churchill Drive entrances.

The paths are well maintained, the parking lots (but not the paths) are plowed and sanded in winter, the trails left snow covered for winter snowshoeing or cross-country skiing.

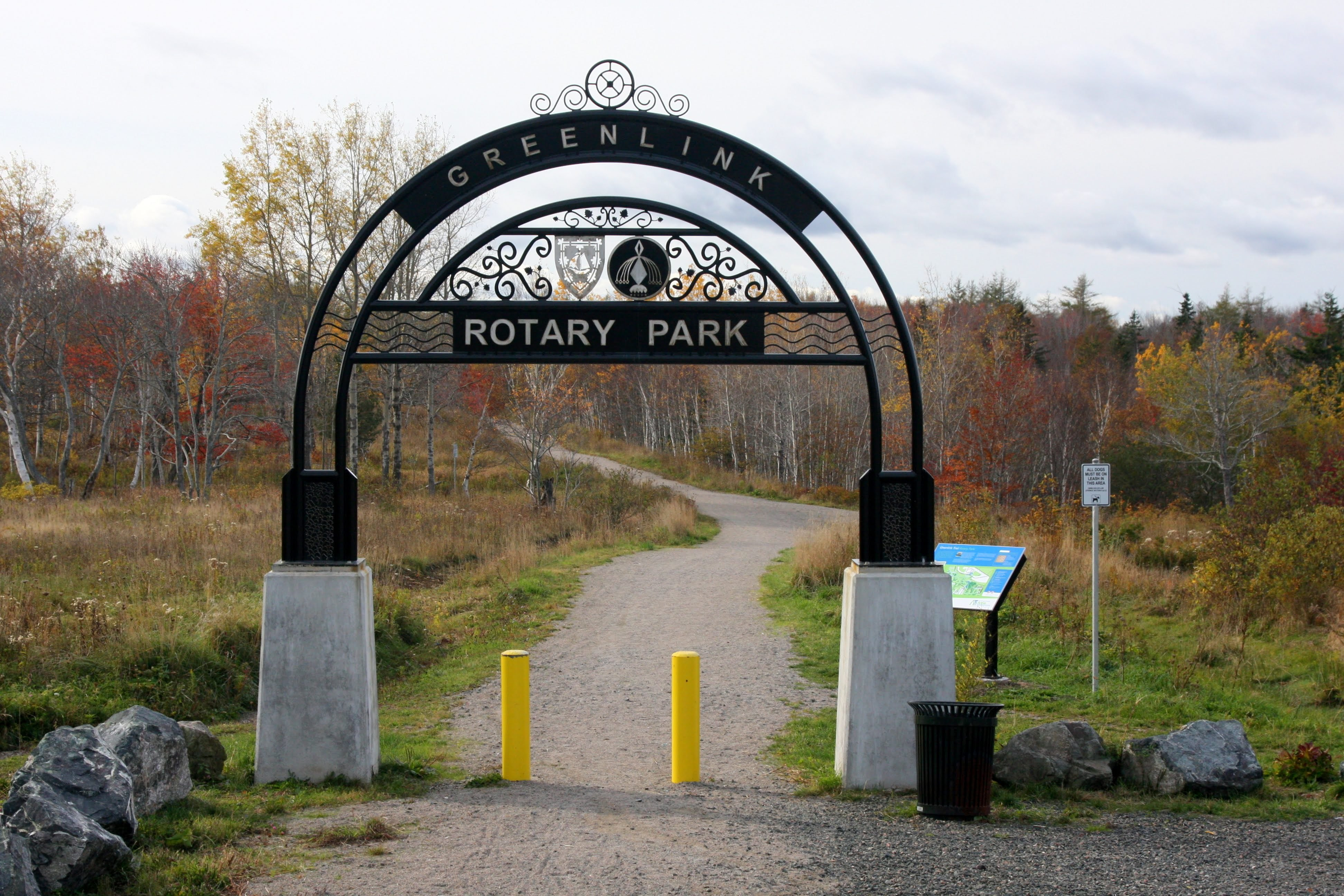
Rotary Drive Entrance

=== Trail access ===
Access to the trail system is at the following locations:

- Cul-de-sac at the end of Maillard Street, Membertou (next to new rink and the Hampton Inn) - 51 Maillard St, Membertou, NS B1S 3W4
- Churchill Drive with a parking area - 425 Churchill Dr, Mira Road, NS B1P 0B1
- Cape Breton Regional Hospital (near staff entrance) - 45 Weatherbee Rd, Mira Road, NS B1M 0A1
- End of Shandwick Street - 142 Shandwick St, Sydney, NS B1P 4V6
- Rotary Drive with a parking area - 331 Rotary Dr, Sydney, NS B1P 6L4
- Saint Anthony Daniel (Shipyard) Ball Park (just behind park) with a parking area - 24 Mt Kemmel St, Sydney, NS B1S 3V6

=== Off Leash Dog Park ===
Beginning in July 2013 a trial period began where pets were permitted on the trails throughout Greenlink Rotary Park Trail System but had to be leashed and managed by their owners. At this same time the Rotary Park Off Leash Park was designated adjacent to the trails, encompassing over 12 acres (4.9 ha) of the greater park area.

In July 2014 this became a permanent feature of the park, dogs are now permitted off leash provided the dog is under the control of the owner. The dog park area is unfenced but preserves a 30 metres (100 ft) buffer from the Greenlink Trails, Rotary Drive, and the abutting residential properties with signage indicating where the off leash area begins and ends.

=== Disc golf ===
2017

A nine-hole disc golf course was incorporated into the park in the summer of 2017, with an official unveiling on 25 October that year. All "holes" are listed as par-3 and have standard disc golf baskets. The course lies in a mixed terrain of low hills, trees and open areas and part of the course shares a section of the off-leash dog park.

Like all amenities in Greenlink Rotary Park, the disc golf course is free for the public to use and can be accessed near the park gate on Rotary Drive.

2020

The original 9-hole layout was upgraded to a full 18-hole course. Construction began in 2020 and was finished in early 2021. Only 3 original holes remain. 15 completely new holes were designed throughout the property. This layout is now known as the Yellow Layout (or Original). As of 2024, this remains the most popular layout/ course in Cape Breton.

2021

The First ever Cape Breton Open was held at Rotary Park Disc Golf Course. The inaugural champion Michael Stoddart. Michael spent a portion of his childhood in Sydney, making him the perfect champ.

2022

Rotary Park Disc Golf Course was upgraded to 27 holes. The Membertou Loop was added to the property. The addition of these holes incorporated elite-tier holes into the area. Something that was lacking beforehand. This allowed for several different loop combinations. At this point, Rotary Park has multiple layouts (Yellow, Pink, Green, Double Park Loop)

The second-ever Cape Breton Open was held on four layouts. Green, Yellow, Pink, and 27 Hole Layout. Michael Stoddard also became a two-time champion.

2023

The Cape Breton Open was held using three layouts. Green, Yellow, and Pink. There was a new champion crowned in Nathan McCarthy. Shooting A course record on the Green layout of -9 (-8 adjusted to the traditional layout).

== History ==
=== Wentworth Creek Dam ===
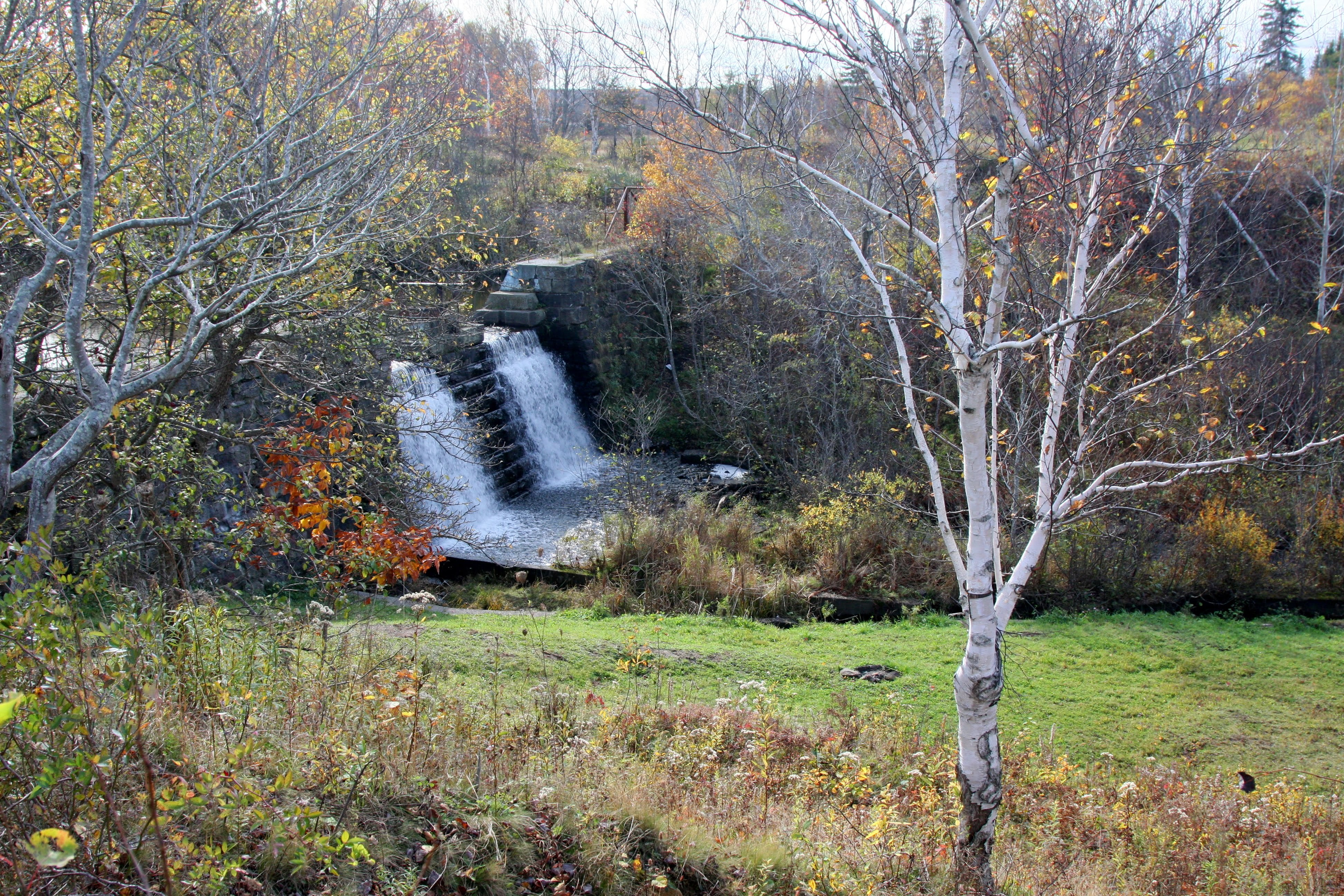
Wentworth Creek and Waterfall

The Wentworth Creek Dam was constructed in 1892-1893. Its purpose was to create a water reservoir for the City of Sydney to service approximately 2,400 residents. The Dam was constructed of large hand-cut stone blocks with mortar joints. It held back the waters of Wentworth Creek (now named Reservoir Brook), and was sized to retain approximately 6 million imperial gallons (27 million litres) of water.

A 10" diameter cast iron transmission main was laid following the creek valley floor, carrying the water from the new reservoir to the City of Sydney, and a network of distribution and service lines were installed by Fall 1883 when the system went into full operation.

By 1901 a booming steel industry and an increase in population placed a large demand on the Sydney water supply and subsequently the Wentworth Dam supply was inadequate to meet the demands of the city. In 1902 a secondary dam was constructed upstream on Sullivan's Brook. This new dam had a capacity of 200 million imperial gallons (910 million litres) of water and draws from a watershed of approximately 1,800 acres (730 ha). This dam is located across the 125 Highway from the Cape Breton Regional Hospital.

As the new dam had an overflow elevation 30 metres (100 feet) higher than Wentworth Dam, the Wentworth Dam supply could not be integrated into the new water supply and therefore large diameter water transmission piping was installed and connected into existing piping downstream from Wentworth Dam. This new water transmission piping continued along Reservoir Brook entering the Sydney water distribution system at Cromarty Street.

=== Rotary Park ===
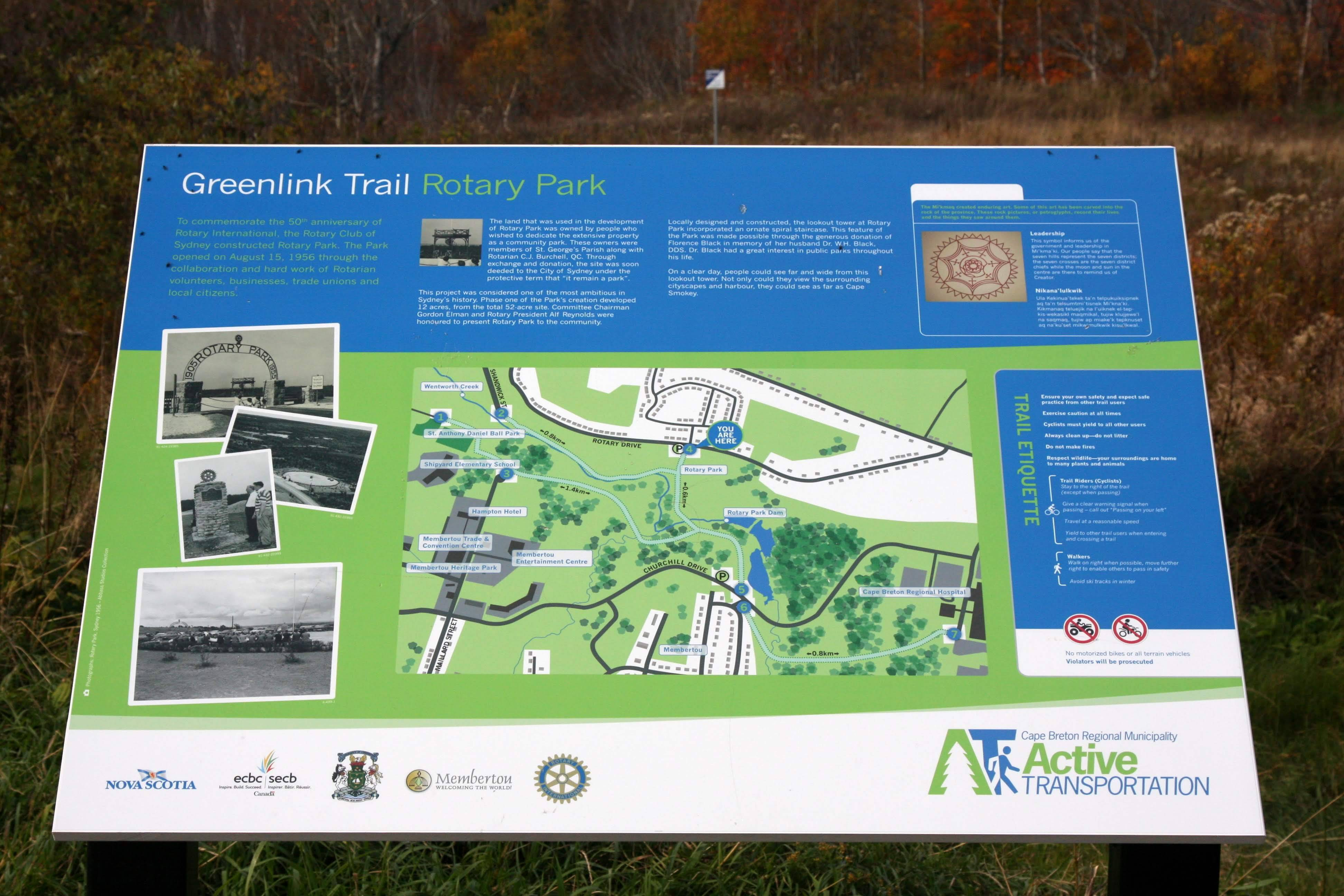
Interpretive panel at the Rotary Drive Entrance

To commemorate the 50th anniversary of Rotary International, the Rotary Club of Sydney constructed Rotary Park. The park opened on 15 August 1956 through the collaboration and work of Rotarian volunteers, businesses, trade unions, and local citizens. The park area included the existing, decommissioned historic city reservoir, including the Wentworth Creek Dam and waterfall dating from the 1880s. This was incorporated into the park as a swimming lake with diving platforms, a lifeguard stand, and a sand shoreline.

The land that was used in the development of Rotary Park was owned by people who wished to dedicate the extensive property as a community park. These owners were members of St. George's Parish, along with Rotarian C.J. Burchell, QC. Through exchange and donation, the site was soon deeded to the City of Sydney under the protective term that "it remain a park".

This $50,000 project was considered one of the most ambitions in Sydney's history. Phase one of the Park's creation developed 12 acres (4.9 ha), from the total 52 acres (21 ha) site. Committee Chairman Gordon Elman and Rotary President Alf Reynolds were honoured to present Rotary Park to the community.

One feature of the park was a locally designed and constructed lookout tower which incorporated an ornate spiral staircase leading up to the viewing deck. On a clear day, people could see far and wide from this lookout tower. Not only could they view the surrounding cityscapes, and harbour, they could see as far as Cape Smokey and the Cape Breton Highlands over 50 kilometres (31 mi) to the north.

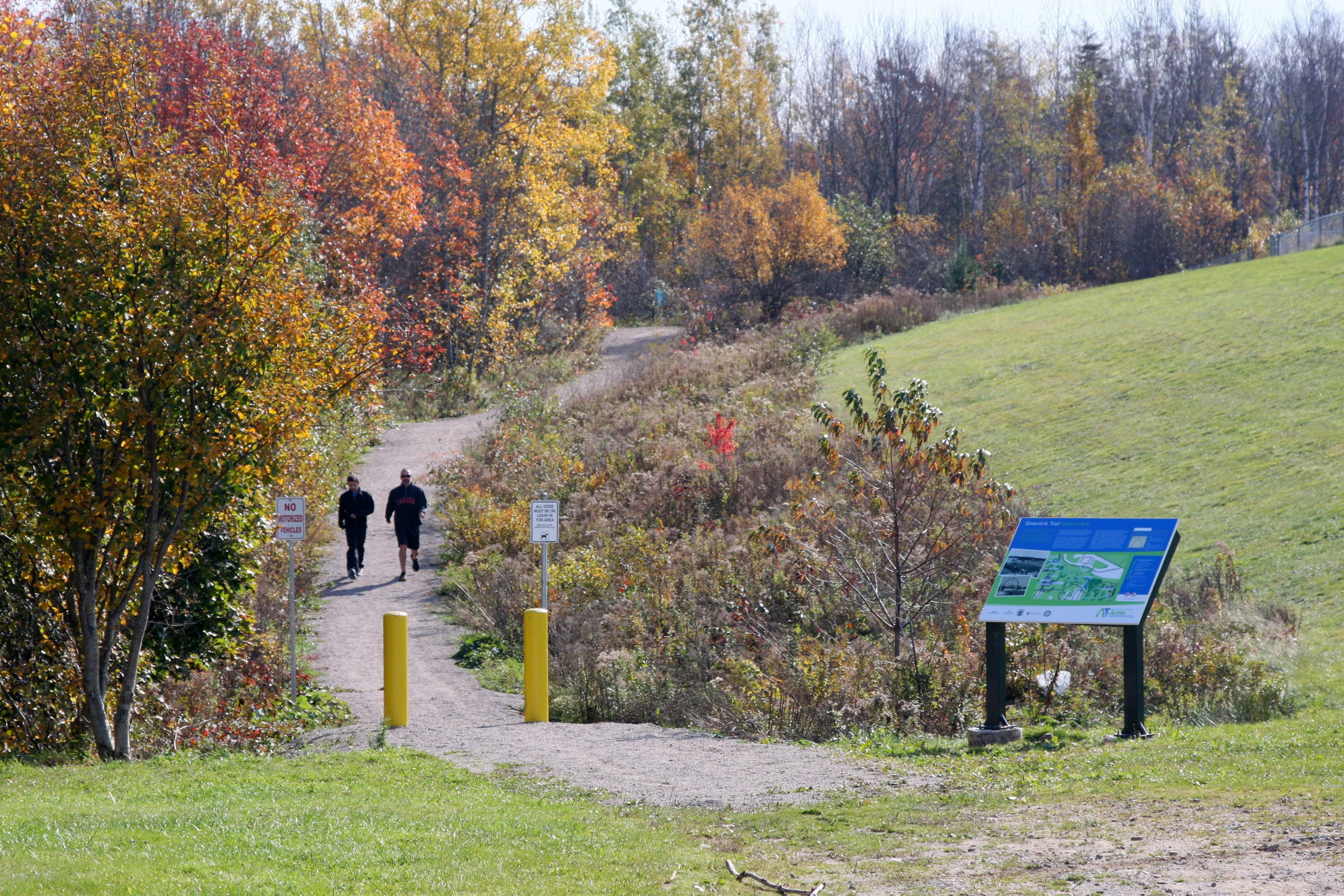
St. Anthony Daniel Ball Field Entrance

=== Greenlink Trail System ===
The GreenLink Park Society was formed in 1997 to plan a major natural recreation development for the heart of Sydney, focused on Rotary Park, including a trail system that would connect Sydney's Waterfront Boardwalk and Wentworth Park in Sydney's downtown to the Cape Breton Regional Hospital, a distance of 3.3 kilometres (2 mi). The proposed greenway project would include common spaces, mini-parks and playgrounds adjacent to neighbourhoods along the route. EDM consulting of Halifax completed a conceptual design for the project in December 1998 and the GreenLink Park Society introduced the proposal to the community.

By 2010, after lying dormant for a few years, planning for the Greenlink Park and trail system resumed. Cape Breton Regional Municipality (CBRM) conducted public consultations, and by spring of 2012 work on developing the trail system was underway. While there had been an informal series of trails in Rotary Park, with some foot bridges and other amenities, these had generally fallen into disrepair. Earlier work by the CBRM to install municipal infrastructure that passed through Rotary Park, such as a new sewer for the then new Cape Breton Regional Hospital, and a new water main for the city's water supply, had resulted in repairs and improvements to existing trails and creation of new access roads and a new stream crossing.

The $425,000 Greenlink project, part of the CBRM's Active Transportation Plan, took advantage of these existing routes to create an integrated trail system by upgrading and enhancing the existing walking trails, widening and resurfacing the trails with crushed limestone to a standard 2.5 to 3 metres (8 to 10 ft) width. Benches were installed along the routes, trees planted, interpretive panels and guide signs were installed. Green Gabion Baskets were placed along sections of the Shandwick Street trail to act as retaining walls where side slopes were steep. Drainage culverts were installed or improved along the trail where required. Two parking lots were created and decorative arches were installed to enhance the trail entrances.

The trails were officially opened on 22 July 2015 by Mayor Cecil Clarke, Membertou Chief Terry Paul, Membertou Band Councillor David Marshall, and CBRM Councillor Eldon MacDonald.

== Gallery ==
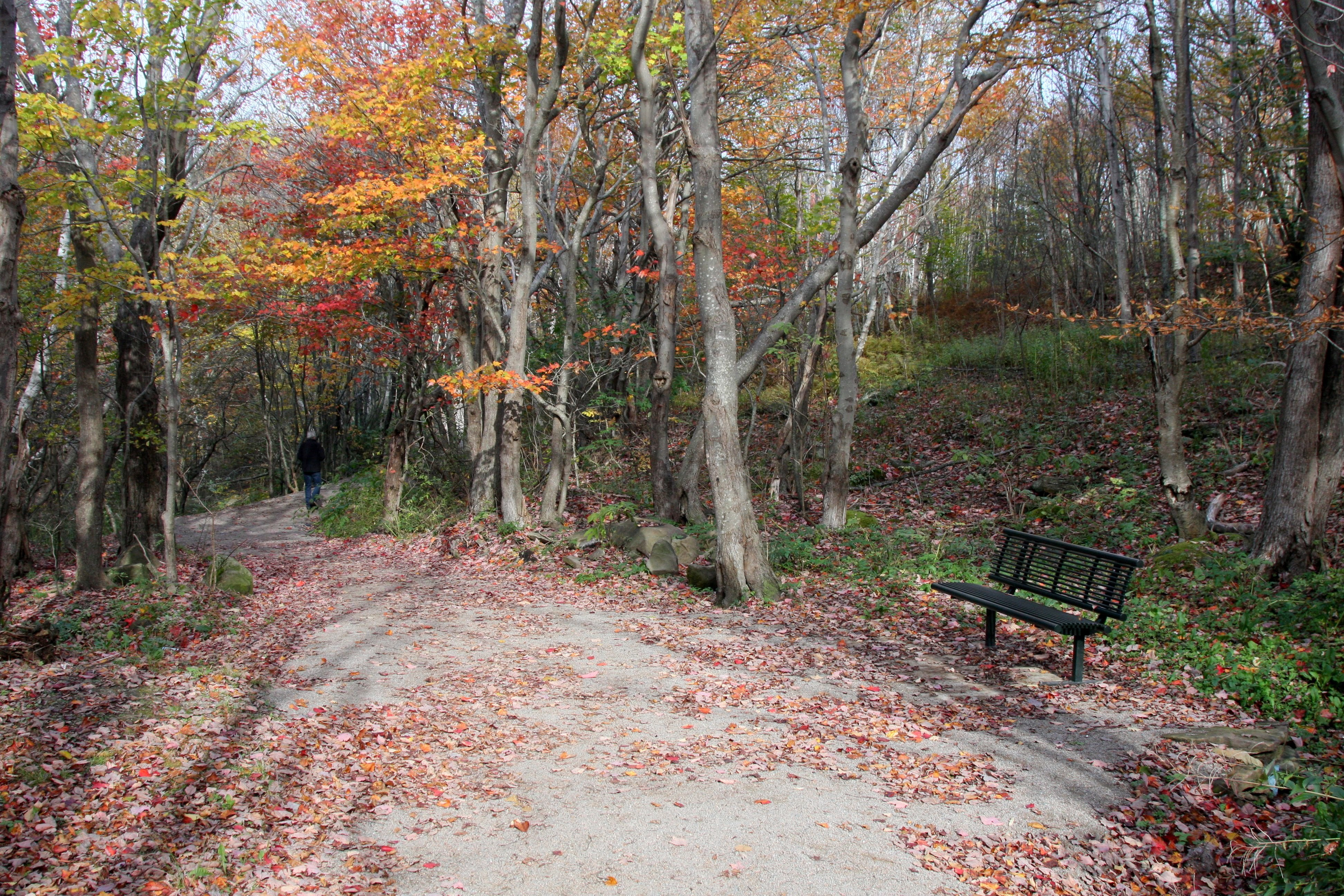
Shandwick Street Trail

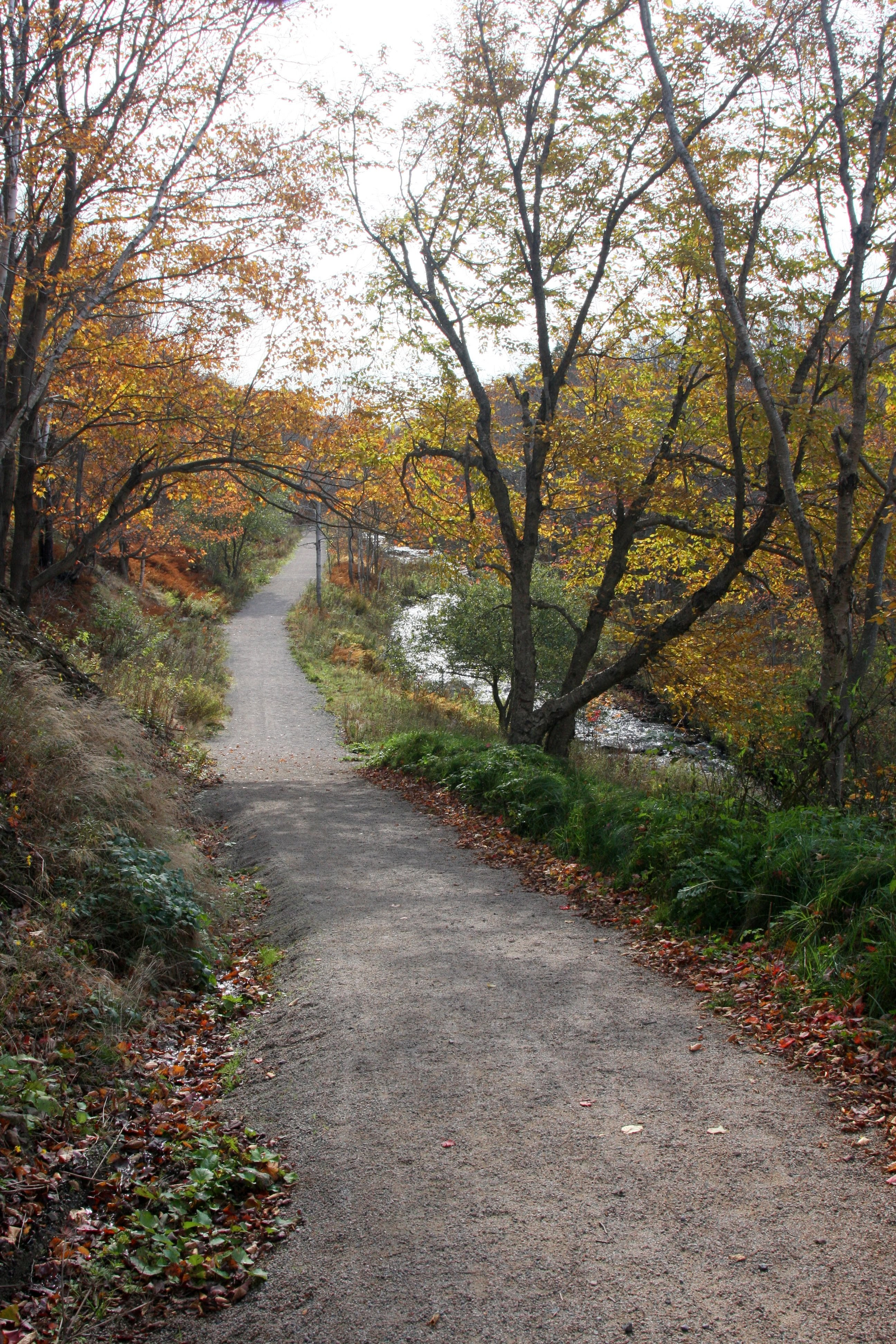
Shandwick Street Trail along Reservoir Brook

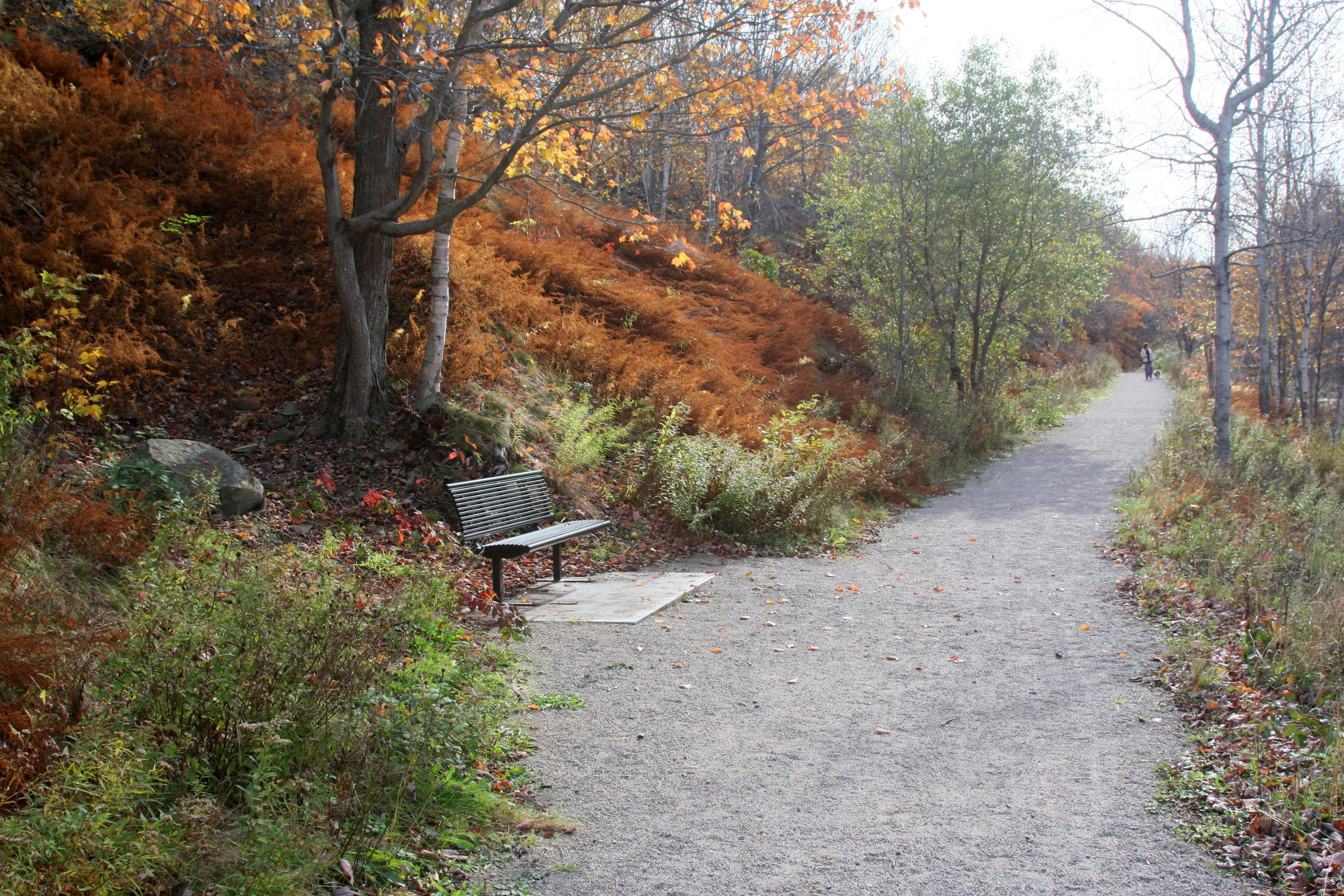
Shandwick Street Trail

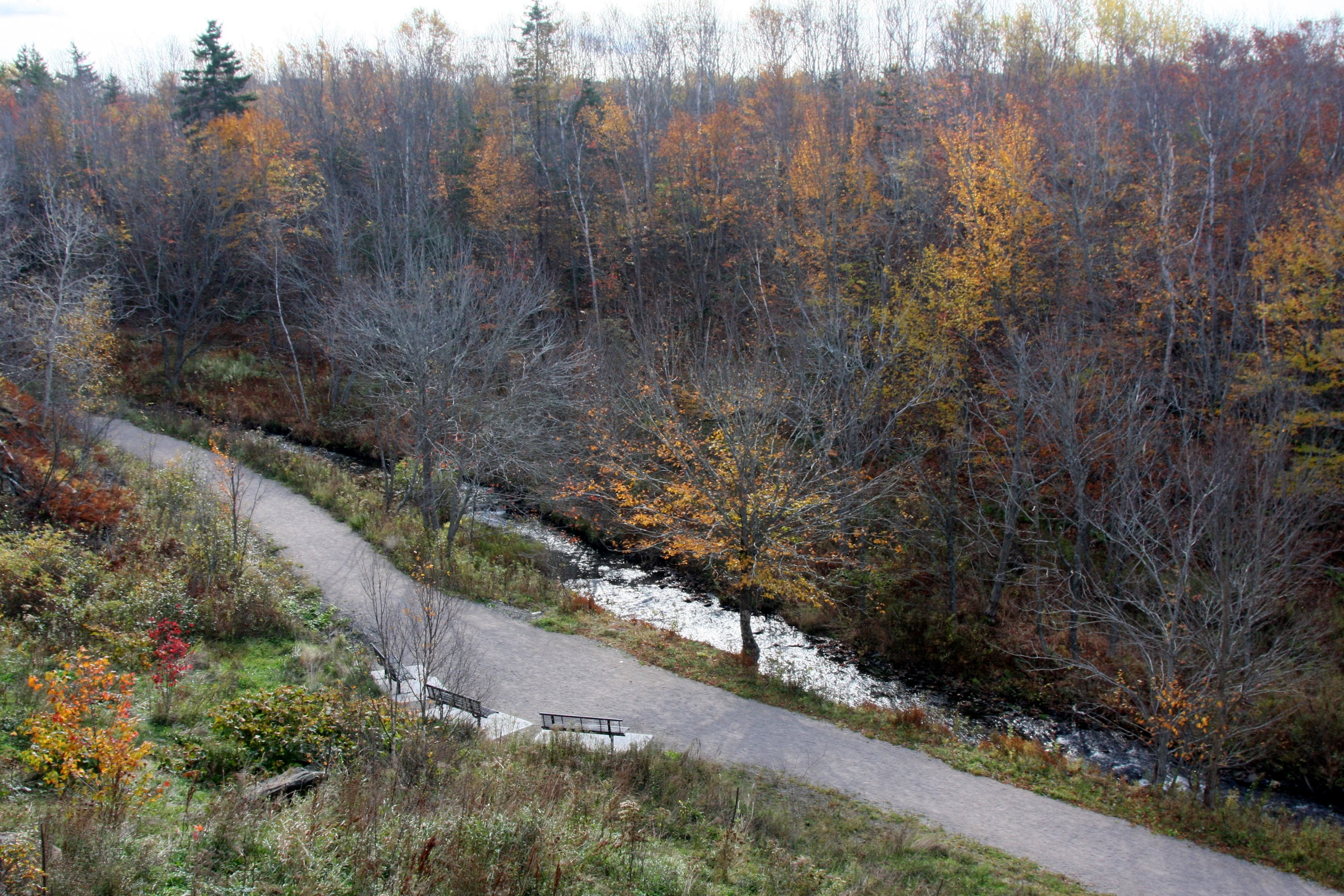
Shandwick Street Trail along Reservoir Brook

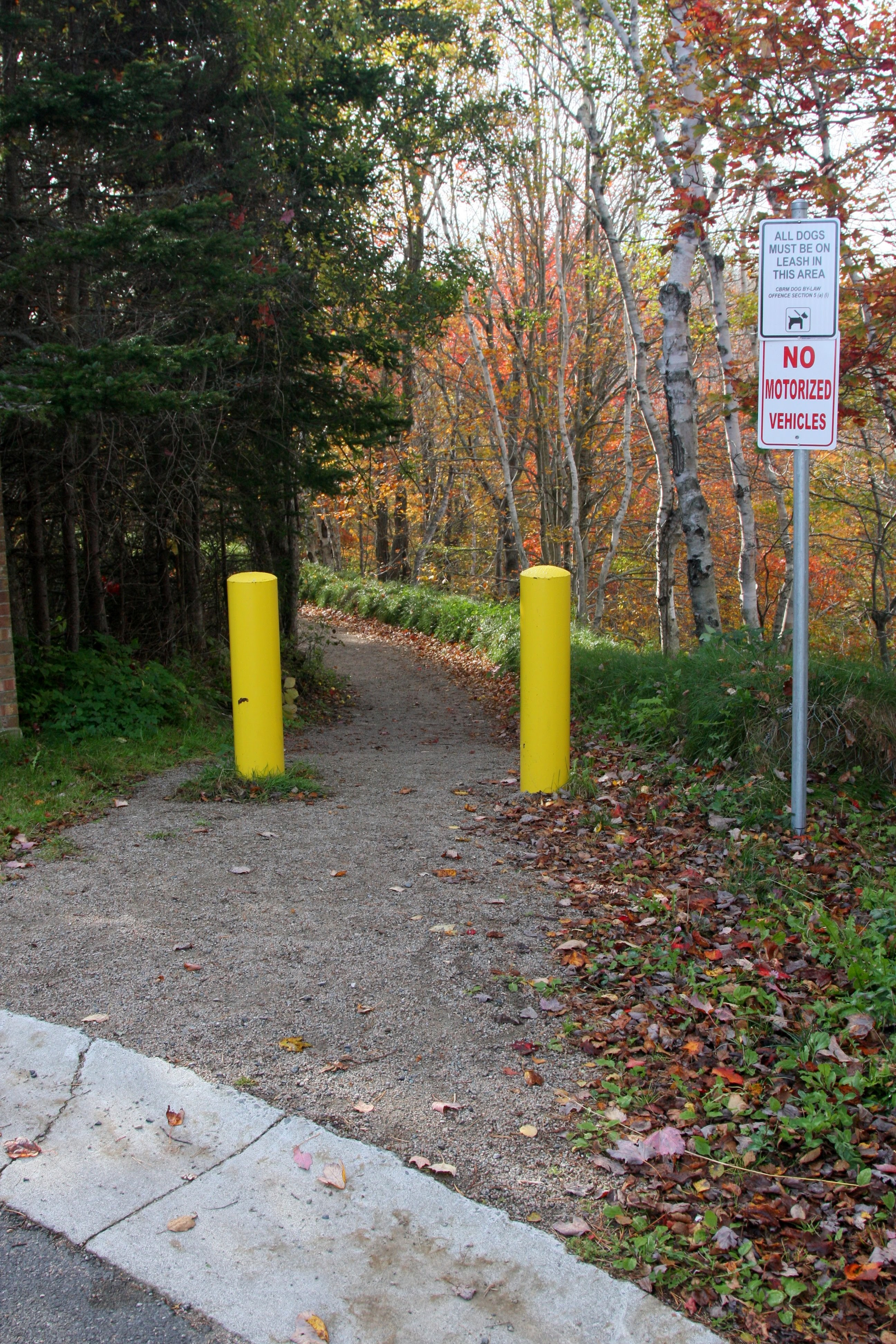
Shandwick Street Entrance

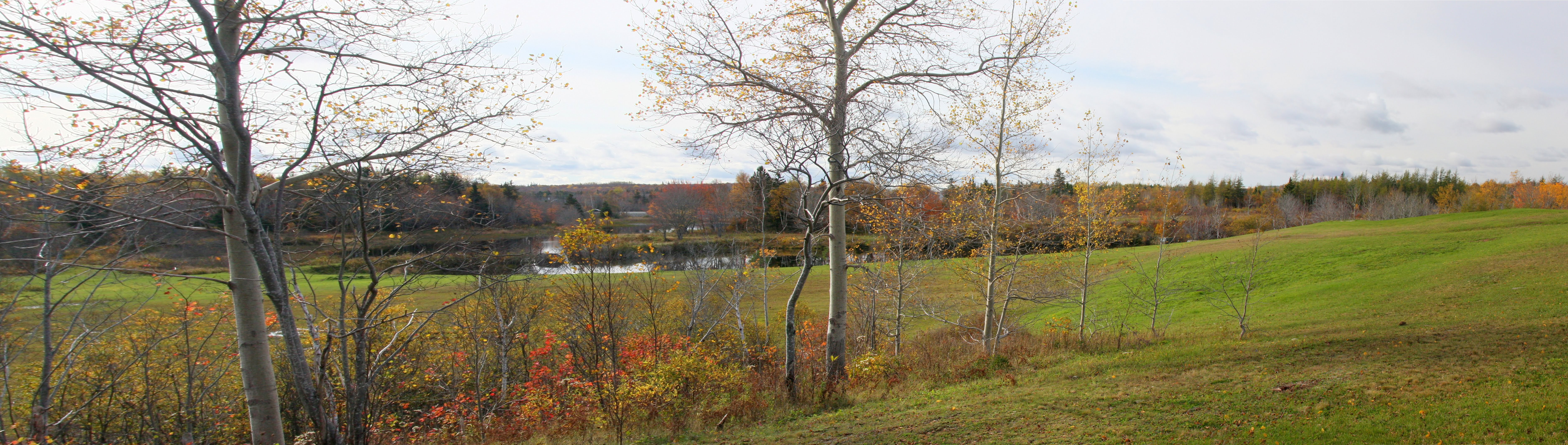
Rotary Park Off Leash Dog Park, Former Reservoir ponds
