= Wentworth Park, Nova Scotia =

Urban park in Sydney, Nova Scotia, Canada

Wentworth Park
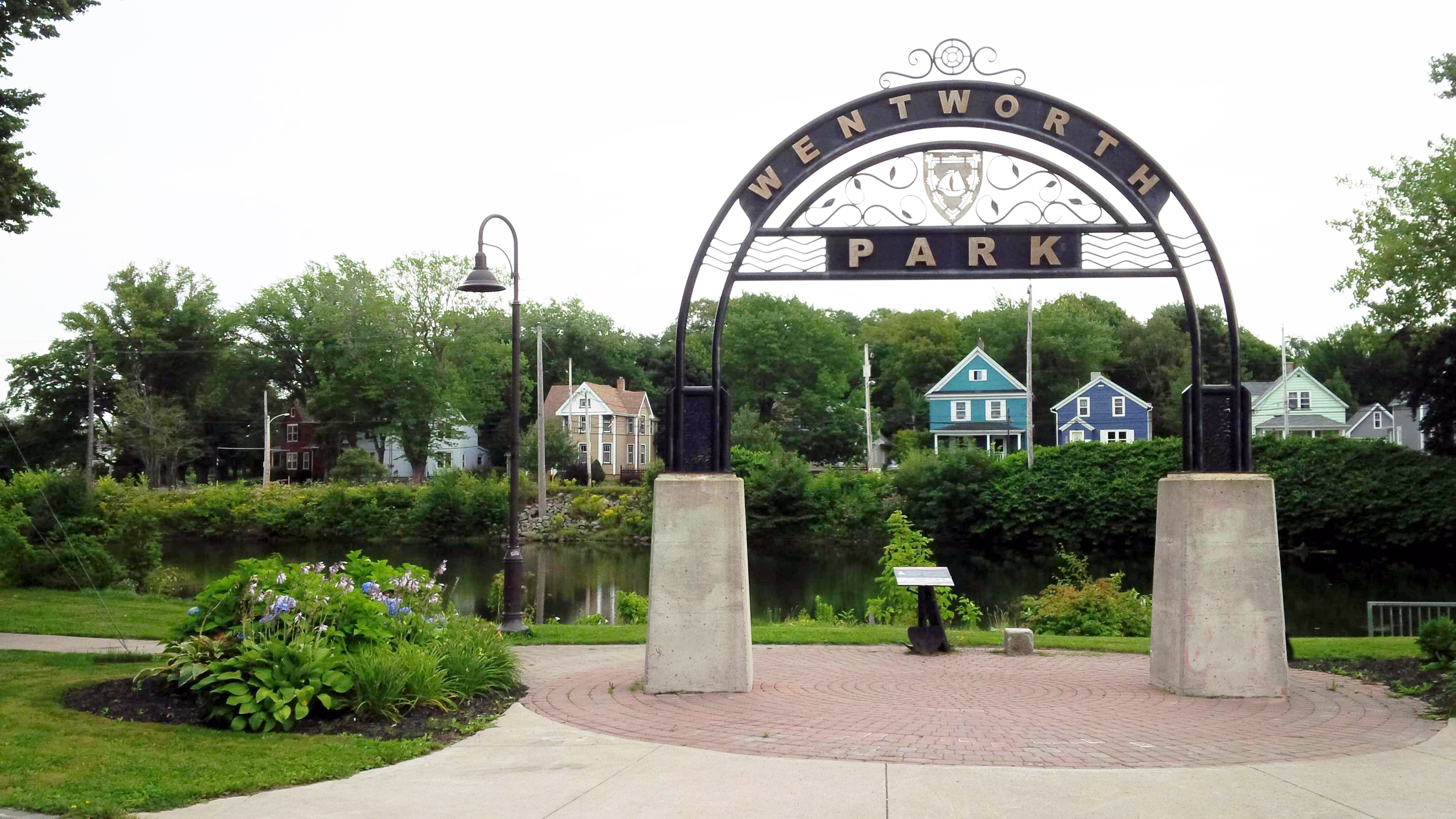
- Byng Avenue entrance arch
- Interactive map of Wentworth Park
- Type: Municipal Urban Park
- Location: Sydney, Cape Breton Island, Nova Scotia, Canada
- Coordinates: 46°07′56″N 60°11′35″W
- Area: 14.5 acres (5.9 ha)
- Created: 1786; 240 years ago
- Operator: Cape Breton Regional Municipality, Recreation, Parks & Grounds Department
- Open: Year round
- Status: Operational
- Paths: Paved, 3 metres (10 ft) wide
- Public transit: Transit Cape Breton Route 13
- Website: Wentworth Park

Wentworth Park is a Canadian urban park located in the community of Sydney, part of Nova Scotia's Cape Breton Regional Municipality. The park was created in 1786; 240 years ago, just a year after Sydney's founding, making it the oldest of Sydney's parks. Wentworth Park incorporates the Kiwanis Bandshell, a playground, fountains, and a splash pad, as well as a 1.2 kilometres (0.75 mi) network of paved paths surrounding the park's ponds and flower beds.

The park centres around Wentworth Creek, which forms a series of interconnected ponds. The park encompass 14.5 acres (5.9 ha) within the former city's boundaries. It is centrally located on the edge of the city's downtown core. Wentworth Park is divided into two distinct sections by Bentinck Street, which creates a connection from the Sydney Waterfront District to either end of Wentworth Park. A playground for young children is located in the east section of the park.

== Park features ==
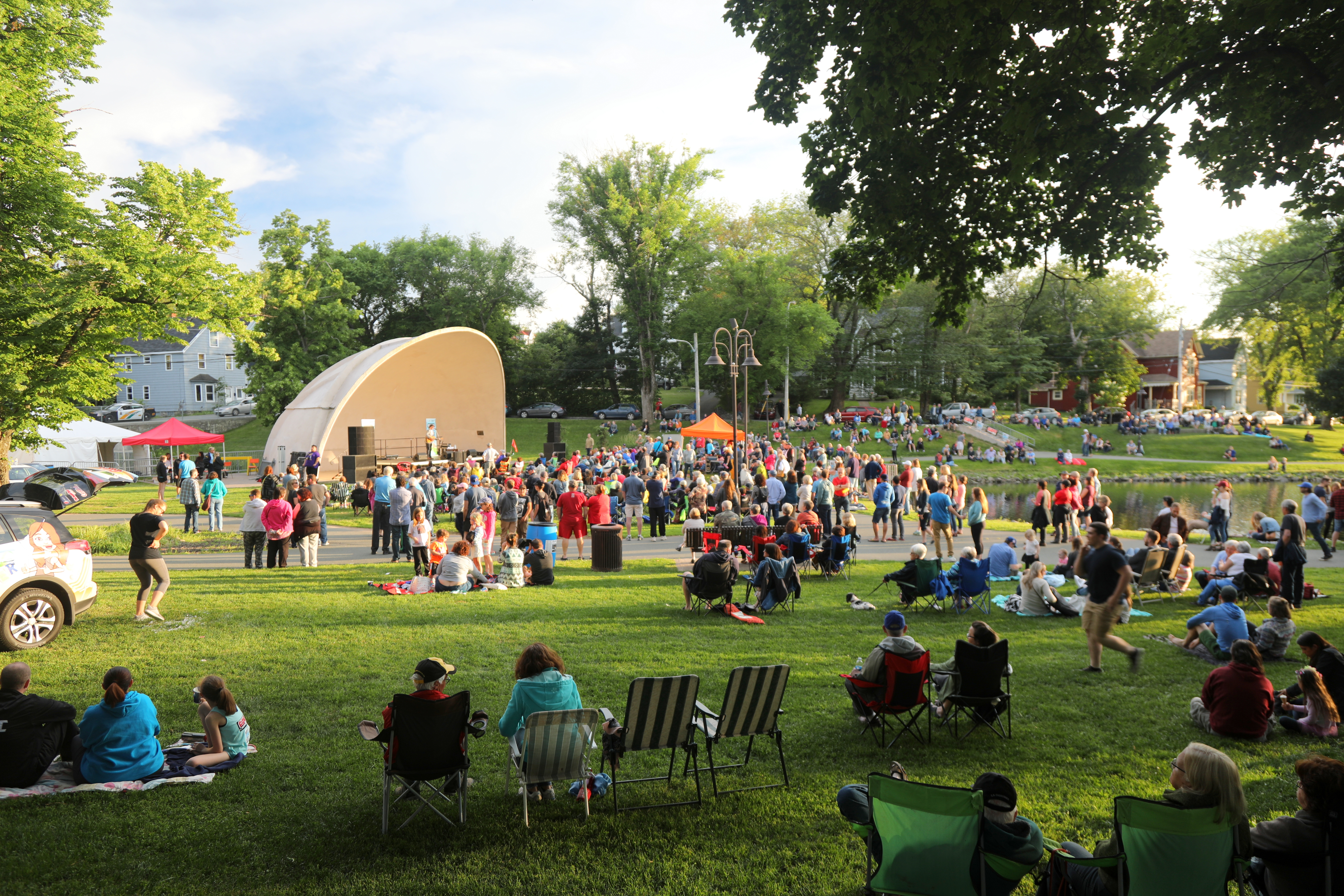
Wentworth Park Kiwanis Bandshell, July 2017

=== Bandshell ===
Since before the construction of the concrete bandshell, musical performances were drawing audiences to the park. In 1915, the Sydney Woman's council raised money for a circular bandshell and flower beds. By 1917, a Coronation Band was playing in the park, entertaining people paddling canoes in the Creek. This old bandshell was removed and a new wooden one located over the run of the former Morrison's Mill in 1960. The Kiwanis Club replaced this with the present brick and concrete bandshell in 1962.

In 1967, Sydney celebrated Canada's Centennial with the lighting of the Centennial flame at the bandshell, and a concert in the bandshell, attended by HRH Queen Mother Elizabeth, Lieutenant Governor and Mrs. H.P. McKeen, Member of the Canadian Parliament for Inverness—Richmond Allan MacEachen, Mayor of Sydney Mayor Carlin Neville, and other dignitaries and members of the public.

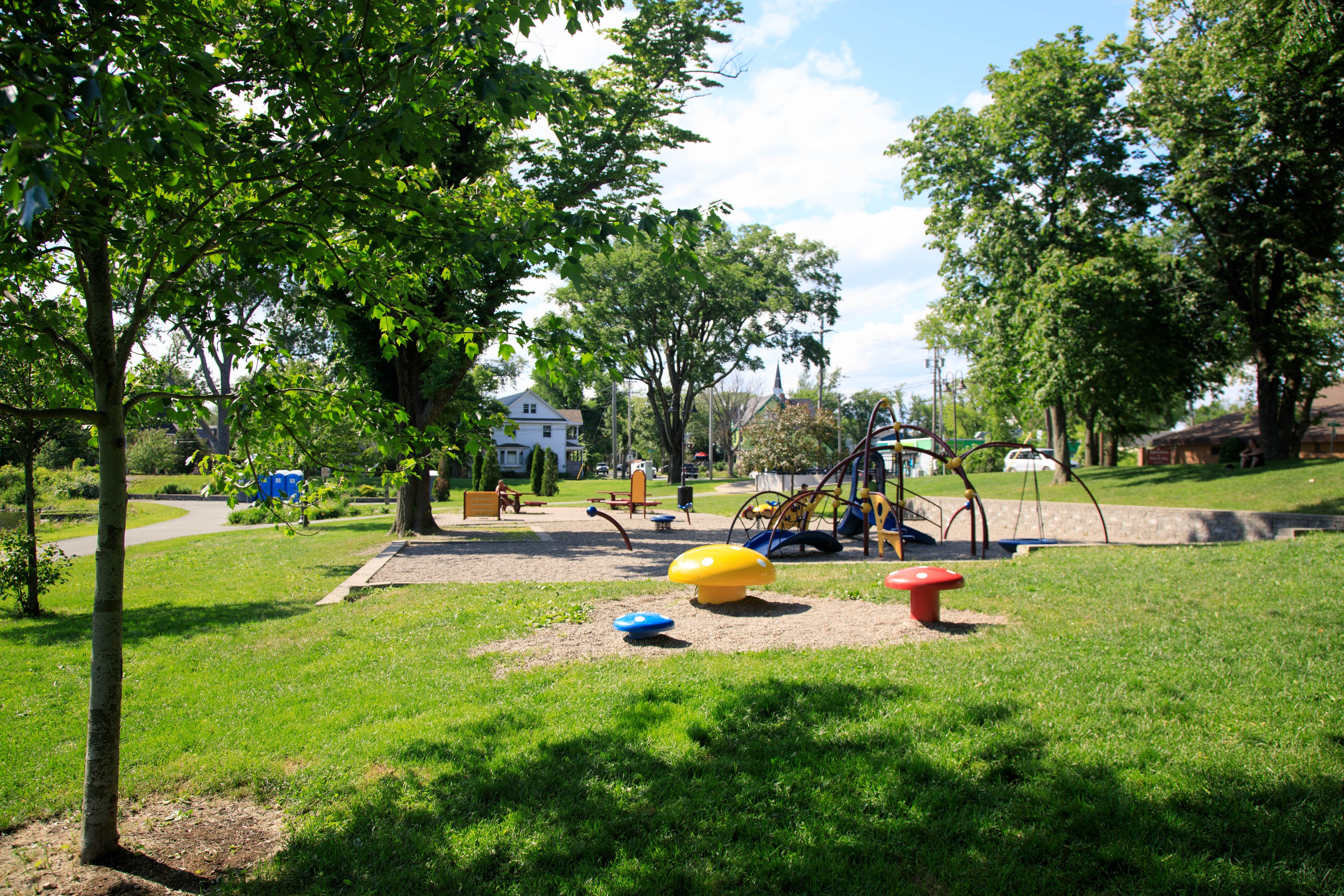
Wentworth Park playground

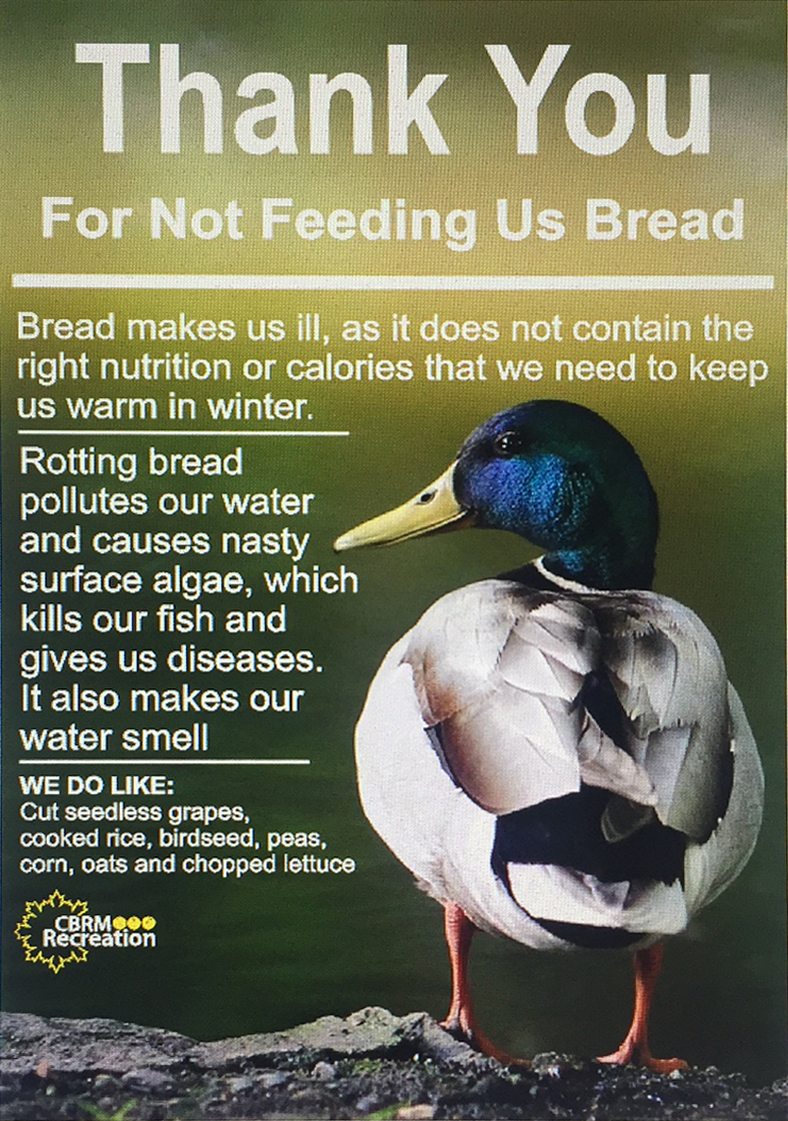

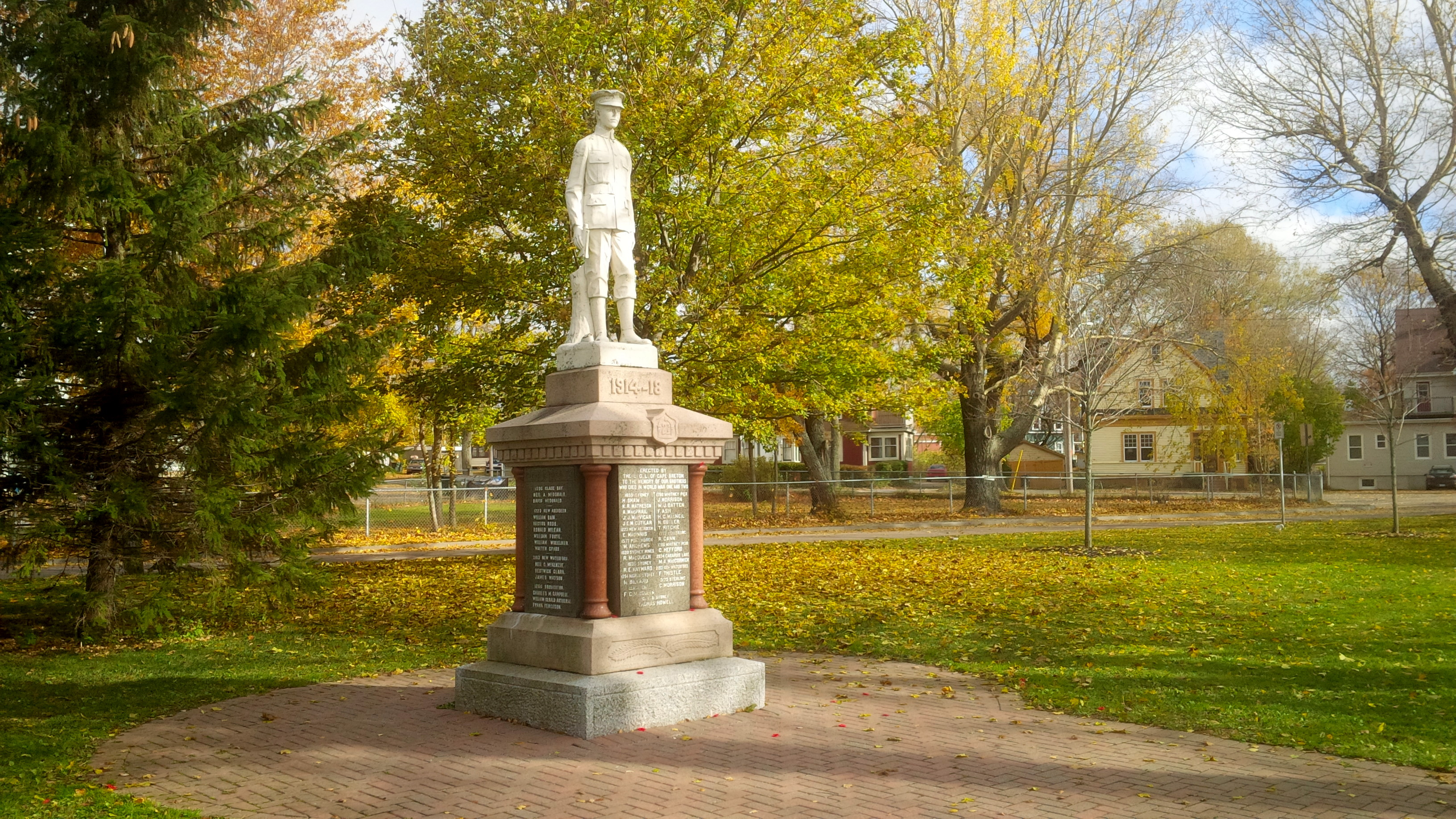
Orangemen War Memorial in Wentworth Park

=== The Orangemen War Memorial ===
The Grand Orange Lodge of British America, more commonly known as the Grand Orange Lodge of Canada or simply Orange Order in Canada, is the Canadian branch of the Orange Order, a Protestant fraternal organization that began in County Armagh, Ireland, in 1795. It has played a large part in the history of Canada, with many prominent members including four prime ministers.

The Orangemen War Memorial in Wentworth Park commemorates members of the Orange Order from Cape Breton County who died while serving in the armed forces in World War I. It was installed in the park first in 1921, at a site next to George Street, near the intersection of Argyle Street.

A new frontispiece was set on the monument to include Orangemen from Cape Breton County who died in the Second World War, with an unveiling on 7 July 1946.

In 1999, working with a local disabled community activist (who raised 50% of the cost), the Cape Breton Regional Municipality (CBRM) relocated the Orangemen War Memorial from its non-accessible location to a now full accessible location in the Park next to the Anne Terry Pavilion.

== Park access ==
- Transit Cape Breton Route 13 drops at Wentworth Park throughout the day.
- CBRM Handi-Trans can drop passengers off right at the entrance to the park, especially for special events.
- Asphalt paths are free of obstacles for those utilizing mobility aids.
- Accessible washrooms are available on site during the summer months.
- Service animals are permitted in the park, as are dogs on leash, except in the playground.
- Parking is available to the west of King's Road, connecting to the rest of the park by crosswalk and by a pedestrian tunnel.

== Makin' Waves Festival ==
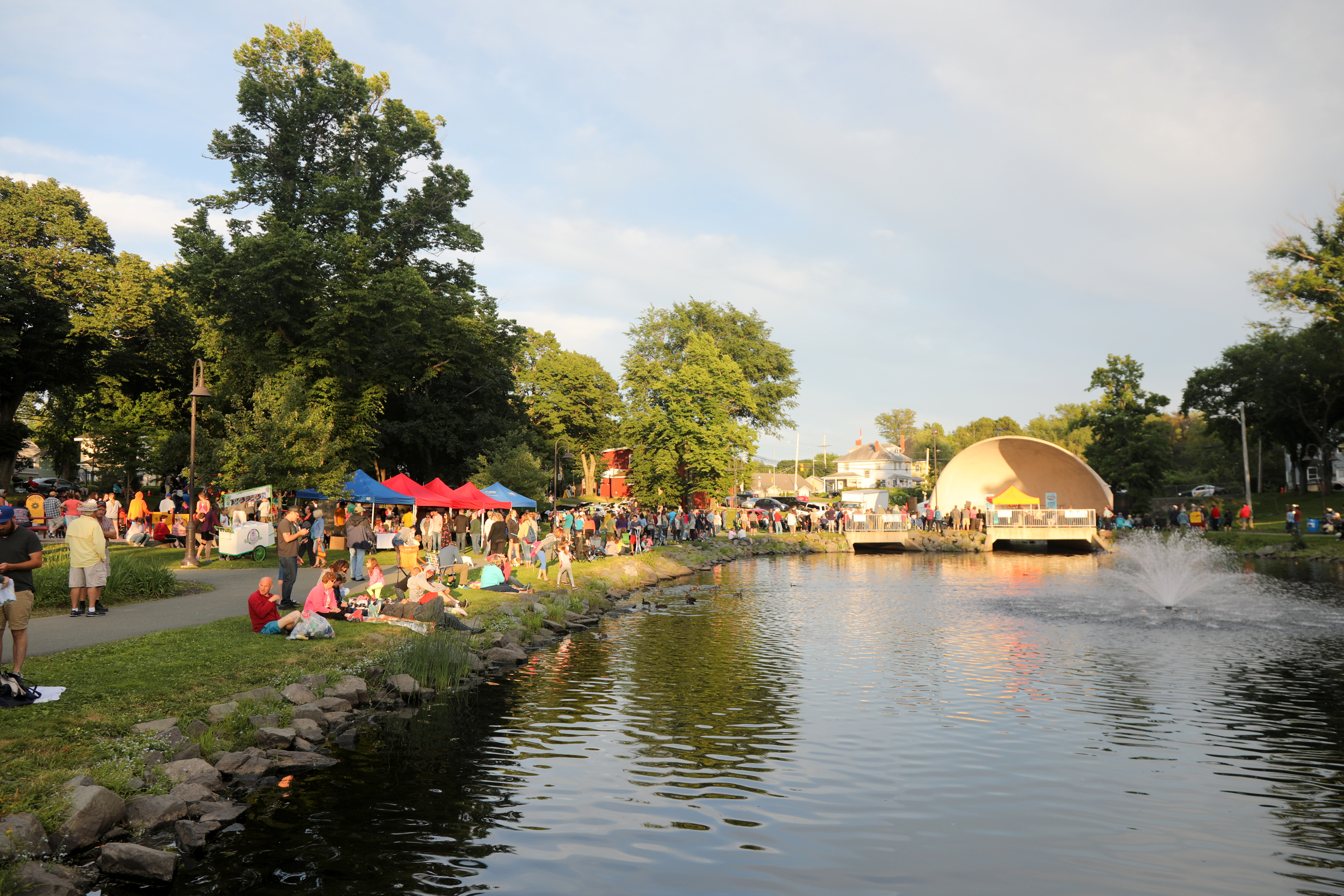
Wentworth Park, Makin' Waves Festival

Starting in July 2015, the Makin' Waves Festival takes place each summer with performers from across the country appearing at the Wentworth Park Kiwanis Bandshell in a family-friendly atmosphere each Thursday evening in July starting at 6pm. With free admission, an onsite playground, and close proximity to many local amenities, Makin’ Waves welcomes residents and guests of all ages.

Makin' Waves presents nationally and internationally recognized artists over the five weeks of the festival each summer, with a cross section of musical genres represented. The free event features food trucks, family activities and the popular festival market.

The concert series' attendance increases each year, over 10,000 people attending in 2019. The 2019 lineup included Wintersleep with Fire Valley Fire, Slowcoaster with Jah’Mila and Emma Stevens, Joel Plaskett Emergency with T. Thomason, Dave Sampson with Mimi O’Bonsawin, and Port Cities with PEI native Rachel Beck and the Atlantic String Machine.

== John Gracie Christmas Concert ==
Cape Breton Island native John Gracie started a tradition of free Christmas concerts in Wentworth Park in December 2007. Held each year on 23 December at the park's bandshell, the outdoor concerts feature a mix of classic Christmas songs. His duet with his daughter, Toronto based actress/singer, Samantha Gracie is a fan favourite. It is a father/daughter version of the 1949 release, "Baby, It's Cold Outside". Free hot chocolate is provided by Tim Hortons. Admission to the concert is free and a collection is held for The Salvation Army's red kettle campaign.

== History ==
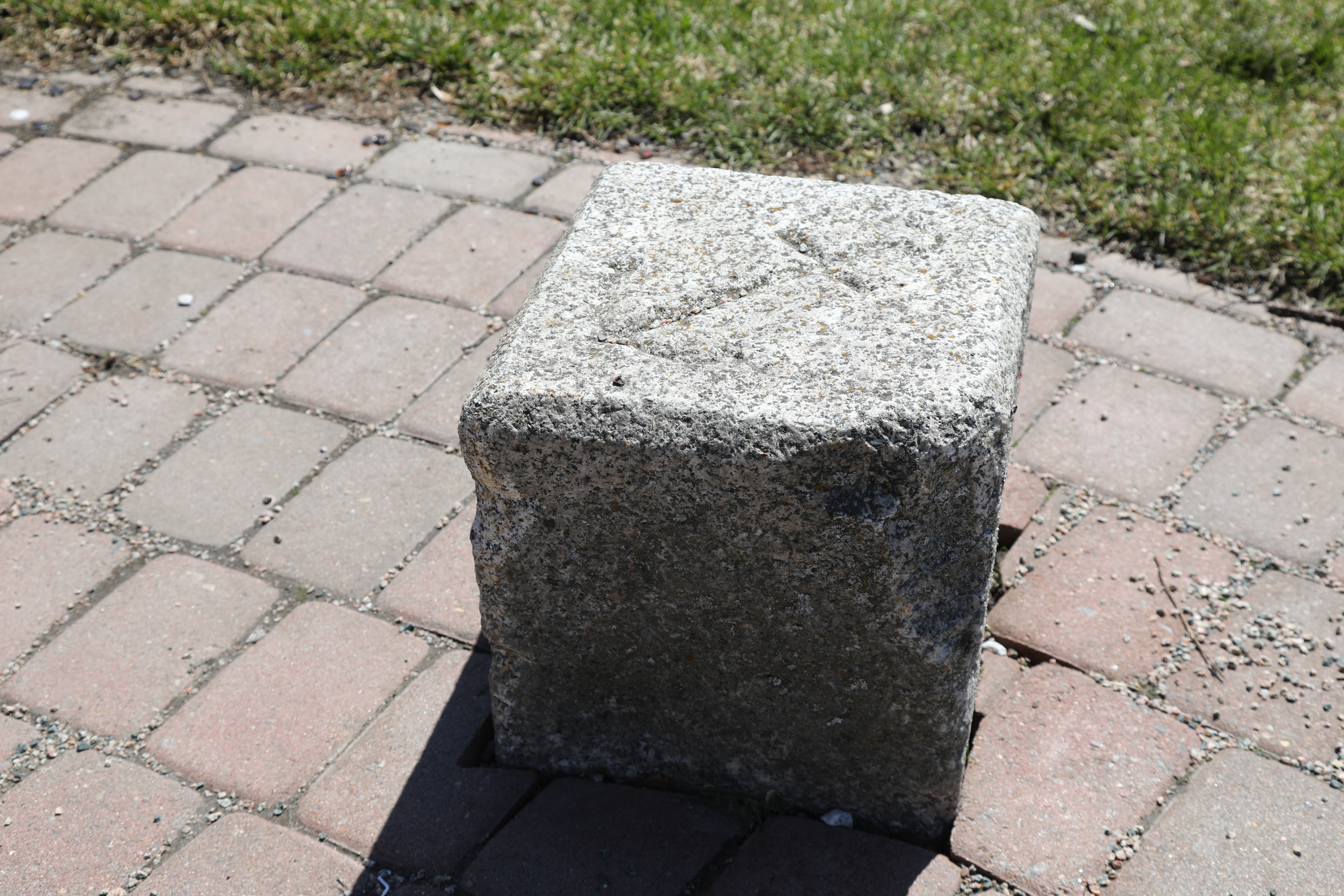
Granite Admiralty Marker - The British admiralty, in an effort to preserve the woods on its banks for possible used by the British Navy, had granite markers placed along its boundaries to mark the property. The markers, with anchors carved into the stone, indicating that the land belonged to the Admiralty, were placed at four locations. One was located on George Street, one off Argyle Street, not far from the present bandshell, another, now lost, at King's Road and Byng Avenue, and this one at the corner of present Crescent Street and King's Road.

=== Admiralty reserve ===
Wentworth Creek rises in the hills east of Sydney bringing fresh water to the harbour; it probably served Spanish and Basque fishermen in the 16th and 17th centuries as a place to replenish their water supplies and was a factor in Joseph F.W. DesBarres' decision in choosing the location of Sydney as his colonial capital. Hence its earlier name: Freshwater Creek.

In 1786, John Wentworth, the Surveyour-General visited Sydney to set aside valuable white pine stands on its shores for the use of the Royal Navy. Wentworth reserved a 100 feet (30 m) strip on both sides of the Creek between present King's Road, Great George Street and Argyle Street as Admiralty Lands, to be used as either a government shipyard or a timber reserve. DesBarres named the stream "Wentworth Creek" in his honour.

In 1790, the shipbuilding industry began in Sydney when Philip Ingouville, a native of the Channel Islands, built the first ship here, the NANCY, at the mouth of Wentworth Creek. His workers settled in the area below the creek which is still known as the Shipyard. A street in the area still bears his name.

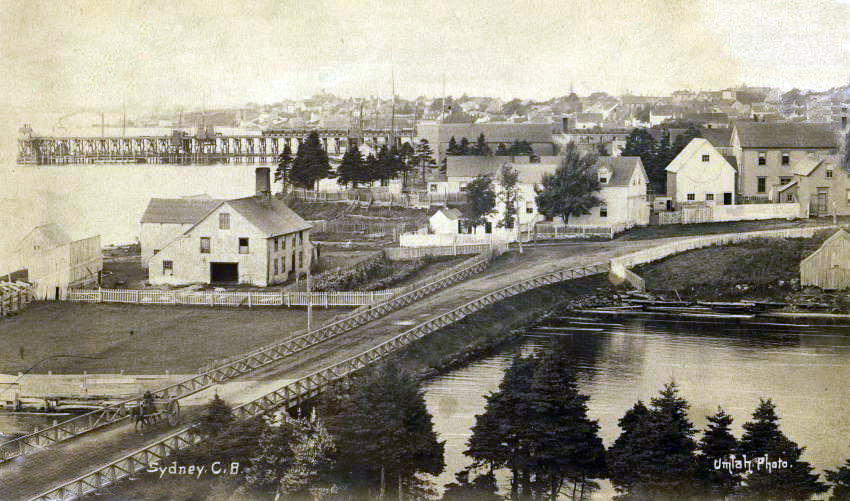
Wentworth Creek, Tannery Bridge, ca. 1882

A bridge was built over the mouth of the creek on King's Road by the 1870s but in 1900 there was still no bridge on Bentinck Street. The path along the north shore of the creek was still secluded enough to afford privacy to young courting couples; hence the name "Lovers Lane" which it kept until 1926 when it was changed to Byng Avenue to honour Governor General Byng, who visited Sydney at that time.

The British Government never made use of the reserve, but instead leased land along the north shore of the creek. Richard and Joseph Dobson of Westmount built a dam on the Creek and the present Argyle Street and erected a gristmill for the grinding of grain. Photos of the Park from around 1895 show the old mill building near the site of the existing Bandshell. The Dobsons sold the mill to Murdock Morrison, who with his son ran the mill both as a grist mill and wool carding mill until 1913. The road that led to the mill from the countryside, now Argyle Street, was known as the "Old Mill Road". In 1946, the city of Sydney bought the land.

In 1899, a railway bridge for the Intercolonial Railway was built at the site of the present crossing. There is anecdotal evidence that ships anchored as far up Wentworth Creek as the site of the existing rail bridge. Construction of the bridge would have limited passage up Wentworth Creek and reduced the use of the creek for transportation. This was probably the single most significant alteration to the Creek.

=== Wentworth Park ===
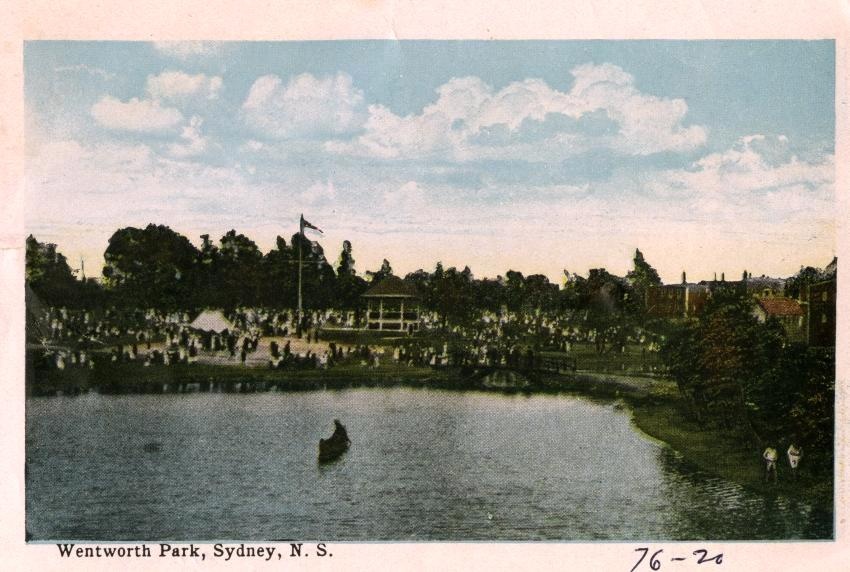
Wentworth Park Poastcard, cir. 1910-1920

Wentworth Park has been integral to life in Sydney and area for more than two hundred years. While the park existed, and was in use in 1786, the form and use were significantly different from the Park of the 1900s. While the area in the early 1800s was certainly different from today, photographs from the early 1900s show a Park that current residents of Sydney would recognize.

During the sudden boom in Sydney in the first decade of the 20th century, houses were built along the Creek. Despite this, people continued to use the Admiralty lands as a park, with many boats and canoes on the ponds, and families picnicking on the lawns. In 1903, town official decided to turn the area into a park and began moves to purchase the land. By 1913, the federal government recommended to the Admiralty the city annex all lots not held under lease for park purposes.

In 1923, landfill was brought in which narrowed the lower end of the creek by two-thirds. In 1928, two swans were given to the park from the royal Swannery and a swan house was constructed.

Finally, in 1934, the Canadian Department of the Interior took over the land form the Admiralty and turned it over to the city. The property leases were closed out one by one, the last house, owned by the Rudderham family, was removed in 1956. The city then extended the park from George Street to King's Road and by 1961, the park assumed its present boundaries.

The modern history of the park shows fewer changes than occurred during the first one hundred years of use. During the 1960s, the Kiwanis Club built the bandshell, the first major change to the park since the turn of the last century.

More recently, gabion baskets were installed to limit erosion of the banks along the water's edge.

=== Donald Marshall, Jr. ===
Donald Marshall, Jr., at the time 17, was convicted of murdering acquaintance Sandy Seale in 1971 and sentenced to life in prison. The two were confronted by a drunken Roy Ebsary, an older man, and his young companion Jimmy McNeil, in Wentworth Park. A short scuffle occurred and Seale was mortally wounded by a knife blow. Ebsary admitted that he had stabbed Seale but then lied about his role to the police who immediately focused on Marshall, who was 'known to them' from previous minor incidents.

After this first trial, which took place in the Cape Breton County Courthouse overlooking this park, Marshall spent 11 years in jail before being acquitted by the Nova Scotia Court of Appeal in 1983. A witness came forward to say he had seen another man stab Seale, and several prior witness statements pinpointing Marshall were recanted. Ebsary was subsequently tried and convicted of manslaughter.

The Crown Attorney's failure to provide full disclosure (contradictory and coerced statements by witnesses, because they believed the evidence not provided had no bearing in the case) brought about changes in the Canadian rules of evidence regarding disclosure. The prosecution must provide full disclosure without determination on what may be useful to the defence (that is the defence's duty to decide).

Donald Marshall Jr. rose to prominence again as the primary petitioner in the landmark Supreme Court of Canada case of R v Marshall [1999] 3 SCR 45 regarding native fishing rights. The Court held that Donald Marshall's catching and selling of eels was valid under 1760 and 1761 treaties between the Mi'kmaq and Britain, and that federal fishery regulations governing a closed fishing season and the regulating and the requirement of licenses to fish and sell the catch would infringe the treaty right.

=== 1985 Kiwanis Club bicentennial redevelopment ===
In 1985, the Kiwanis Club sponsored a bicentennial redevelopment of Wentworth Park to celebrate 200 years of use. The redevelopment included the addition of the Ann Terry Memorial Plaza, which included a large gazebo, fountain, and archway. This addition was constructed on the north side of the largest pond off Byng Avenue. It was replaced during the 2007 redevelopment by the Ann Terry Interactive Fountain and Plaza.

== Wentworth Park Revitalization 2003-2010 ==
=== Background ===
In the summer of 2003, Ekistics Planning & Design (Ekistics), in association with ADI Ltd., were selected by the Cape Breton Regional Municipality as the design consultants to prepare a revitalization plan for Wentworth Park in downtown Sydney. Several public interviews and workshops were conducted to gauge community interest and support and these findings formed the basis for revitalization recommendations for Wentworth Park.

In the spring of 2005, another series of public meetings were held to discuss the future of Wentworth Park and unveil the revitalization plan developed by Ekistics. The consensus at this public meeting was that there should be a local volunteer group formed to oversee the use and maintenance of the Park along with ensuring recommendations from the Ekistics Plan were considered. At that public meeting, where nearly sixty people were in attendance, a steering committee consisting of fifteen volunteers was formed under the name Friends of Wentworth Park.

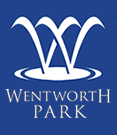

=== Friends of Wentworth Park Society ===
The Friends of Wentworth Park Society (FWPS) was a non-profit stewardship organization run by an eleven-member Board of Directors consisting of volunteer citizens of the Cape Breton Regional Municipality.

The steering committee met weekly for more than two months to come up with the parameters for the "Friends of Wentworth Park Society". The steering committee developed a mission statement, a set of objectives and committees to take back to the public for comment and approval.

The steering committee held a public meeting at the end of May to present its vision for the future of Wentworth Park. At that meeting there was an election of a board of directors and the Friends of Wentworth Park Society (FWPS) was formed. Seven members were elected at large and four seats were designated, one for the Kiwanis Club, one for CBRM Council, one for the business community and one for youth. This ensured a wide and diverse representation on the board.

The board held its first meeting in June 2005 and elected an executive.

They were as follows:

- Wayne Weatherbee – chair
- Alan Peddle – vice chair
- Doug Arsenault – treasurer
- Nicole MacLennan – secretary

=== Revitalization Phase I ===
A $2.3 million renovation to the western section of the park and its facilities began in 2005. At this time all of King's Road (Hwy 4) within the city's limits was undergoing a complete reconstruction, part of which included a realignment of the roadbed where it formed the western border of the park. This work would result in a newly elevated section King's Road across the end of the park, which would take 10 to 15 metres (33 to 49 ft) from the lower pond and change access to existing sidewalks and crosswalks. The planned 3 metres (10 ft) elevation of the reconstructed roadway allowed for the construction of a lighted pedestrian underpass under King's Road as part of a larger plan to connect the park to the Sydney Waterfront Boardwalk on one side and Rotary Park on the other. The renovations also included a new network of connected paved asphalt pathways and path lighting, more natural looking stone riprap borders on the pond's shores for erosion control and shoreline protection, a new elevated concrete temple within brick paver terraces overlooking the pond, and three new floating fountains that lit up at night to improve aeration and water quality. As part of the work, the existing Ann Terry Memorial Plaza and fountain were replaced with The Ann Terry Interactive Fountain, with surrounding paver areas, seating, new trees, and other landscaping.

=== Revitalization Phase II ===
The $750,000 Phase II project, which was underway by August 2008, involved modifications to Wentworth Creek where it flowed through the park. The largest alteration involved the construction of a box culvert to extend the run of the creek beyond the front of the bandshell to allow the area immediately before the performing space to be infilled, creating a lawn for audience seating. A second large concrete culvert was installed in parallel to the creek's run below the bandshell to allow for additional water flow to help prevent flooding of the bandshell area during heavy rain events. Other watercourse changes included improved and more natural looking stone riprap shorelines along the pond, a sloped access area to the pond for skaters in winter, an upgrade to the small dam at Bentinck Street which saw a fish ladder added.

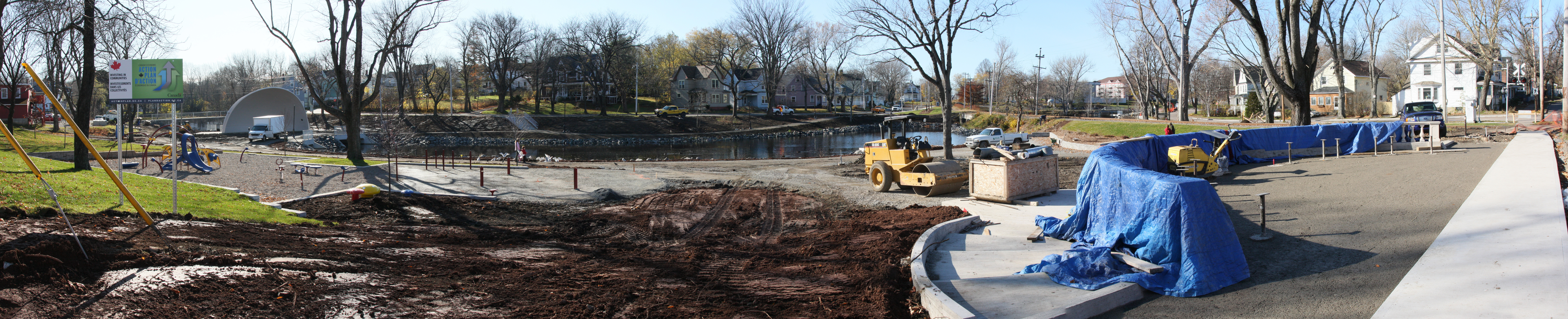
Wentworth Park construction - Revitalization Phase III - November 2009

=== Revitalization Phase III ===
Phase III ran almost concurrently with Phase II, starting in 2008 but carrying on into 2009, at a cost of $850,000. This part of the overall project included a new 'tot' playground, improved accessible pathways with lighting, landscaping, inducing tree planting, and restoration of the park's bandshell itself which has been an important landmark in the area for generations. A floating fountain, lit up at night, was placed in the bandshell pond. A new entry arch was created by Cape Breton artist Gordon Kennedy and installed at the intersection of Byng and Bentinck Streets. Kennedy also created artistic stands for interpretive story boards to explain the park's history.

=== Grand opening ===
A grand opening was held on Sunday 1 August 2010 to celebrate the completion of the park's revitalization project.

=== Park expansion ===
In 2005 CBRM developed an additional 1.5 acres (0.61 ha) section of land along King's Road, bordering on Sydney Harbour, adding it to Wentworth Park. The area was landscaped with trees and shrubs, a gravel path was laid out through the lawn area, and a paved parking area for the public was created.

== Gallery ==
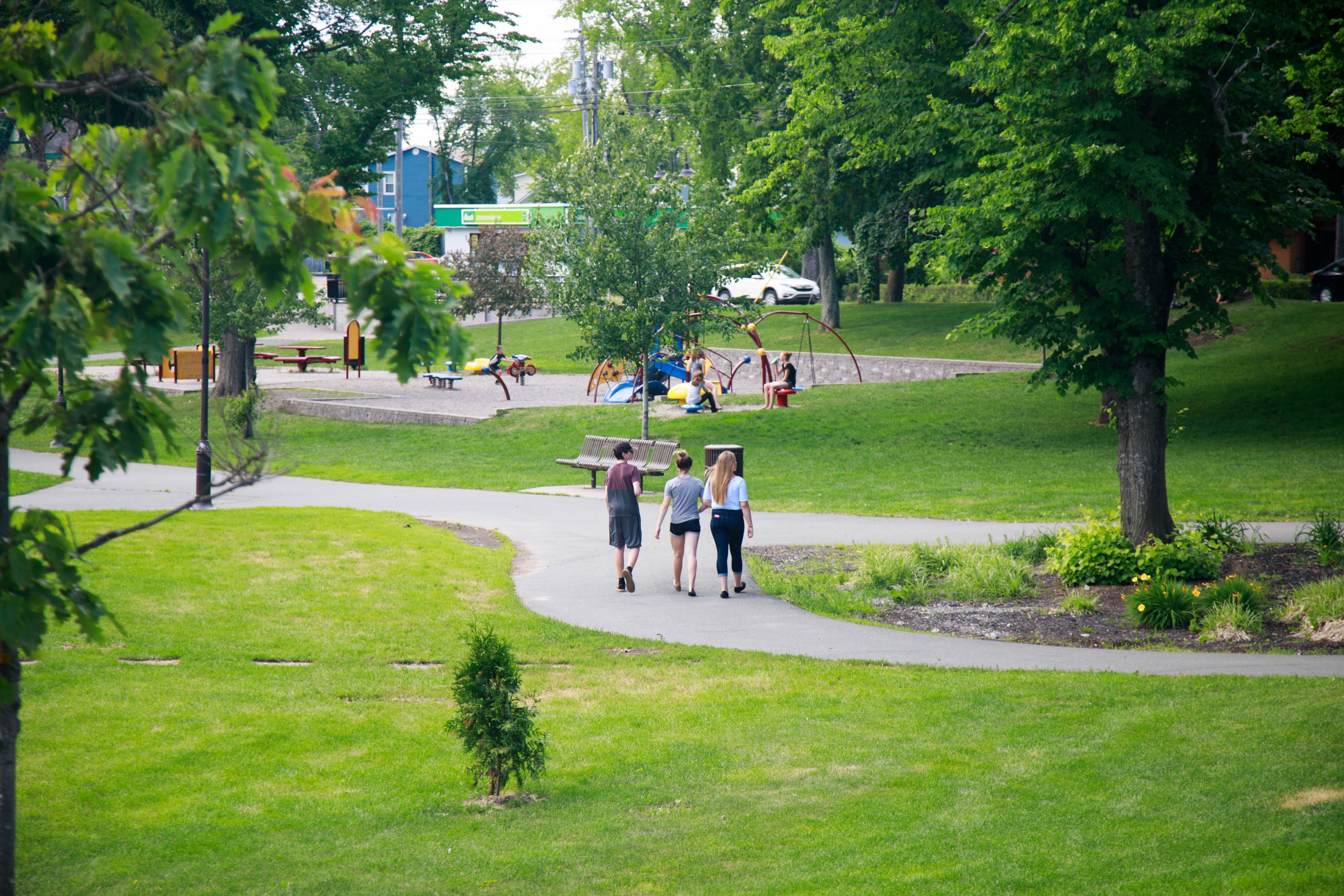
Wentworth Park Playground

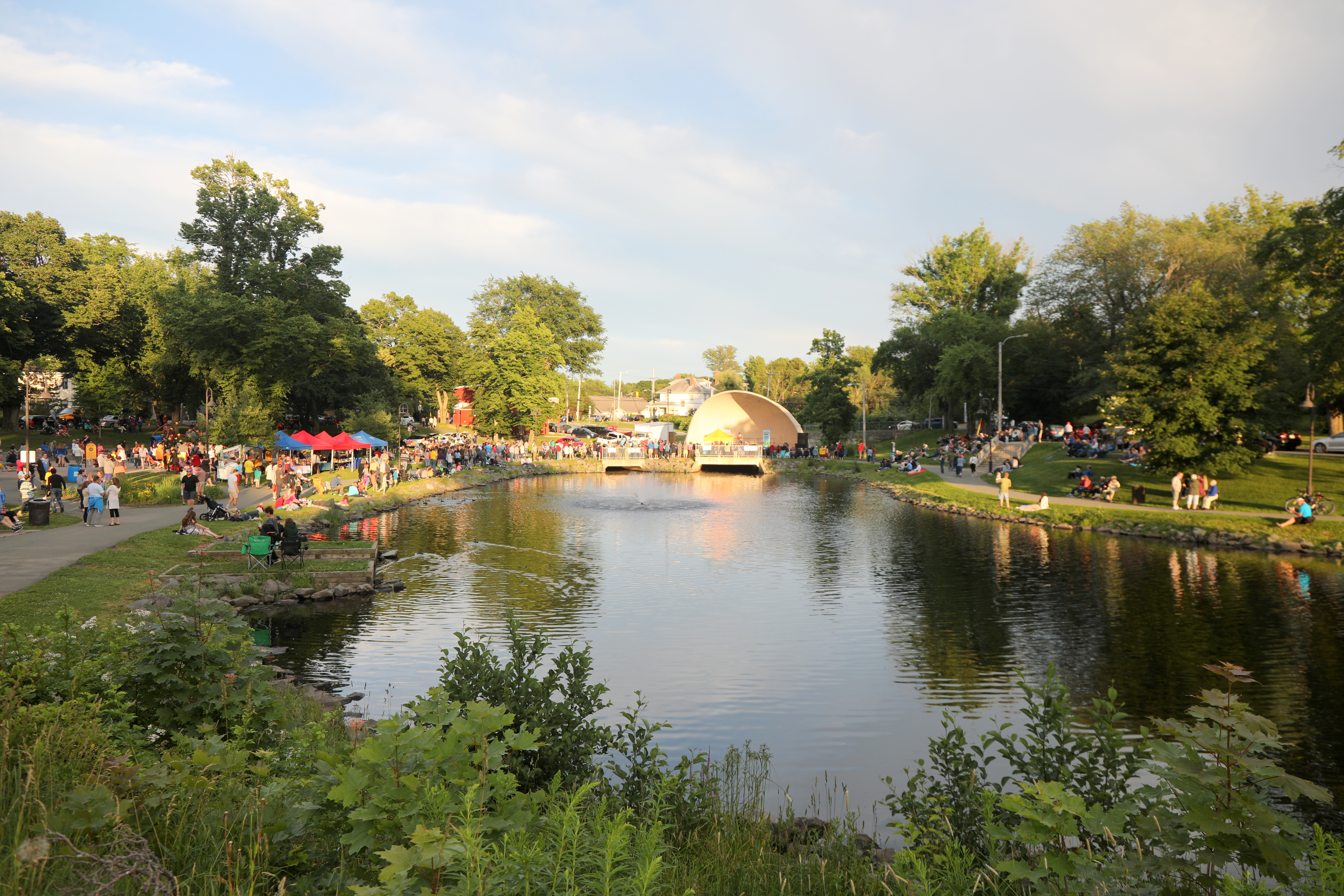
Wentworth bandshell & East Pond

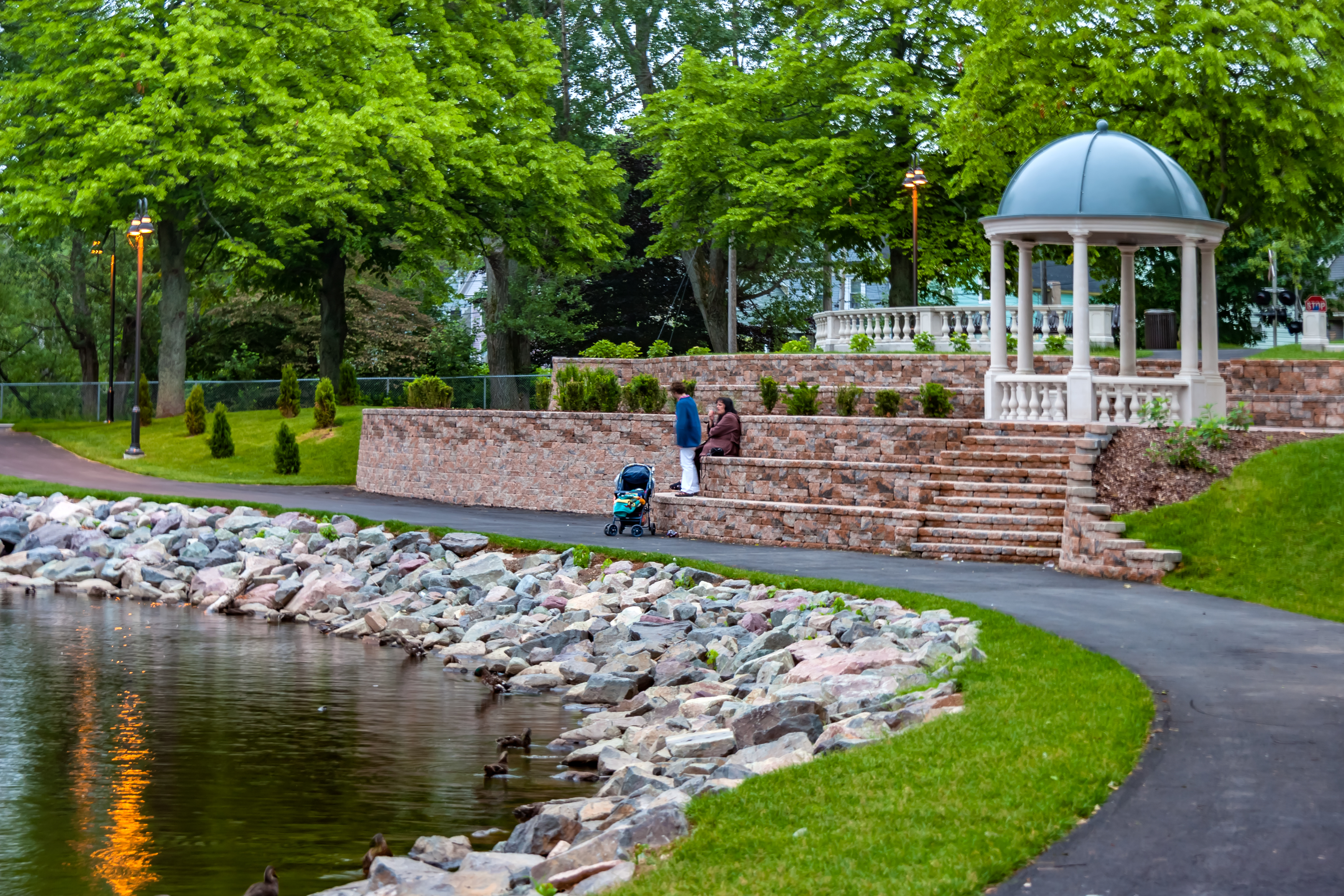
Wentworth Park gazebo

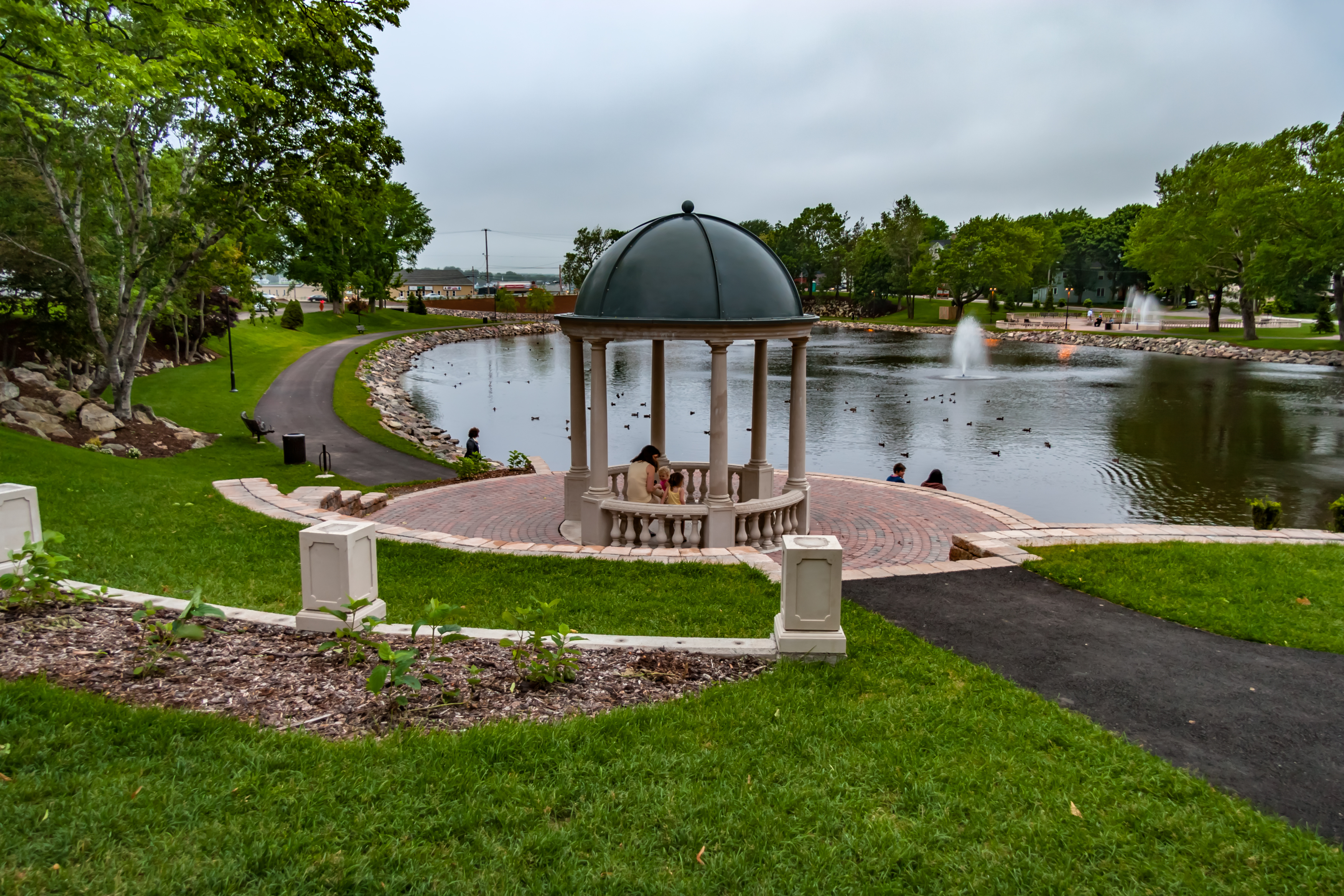
Wentworth Park, gazebo & West Pond

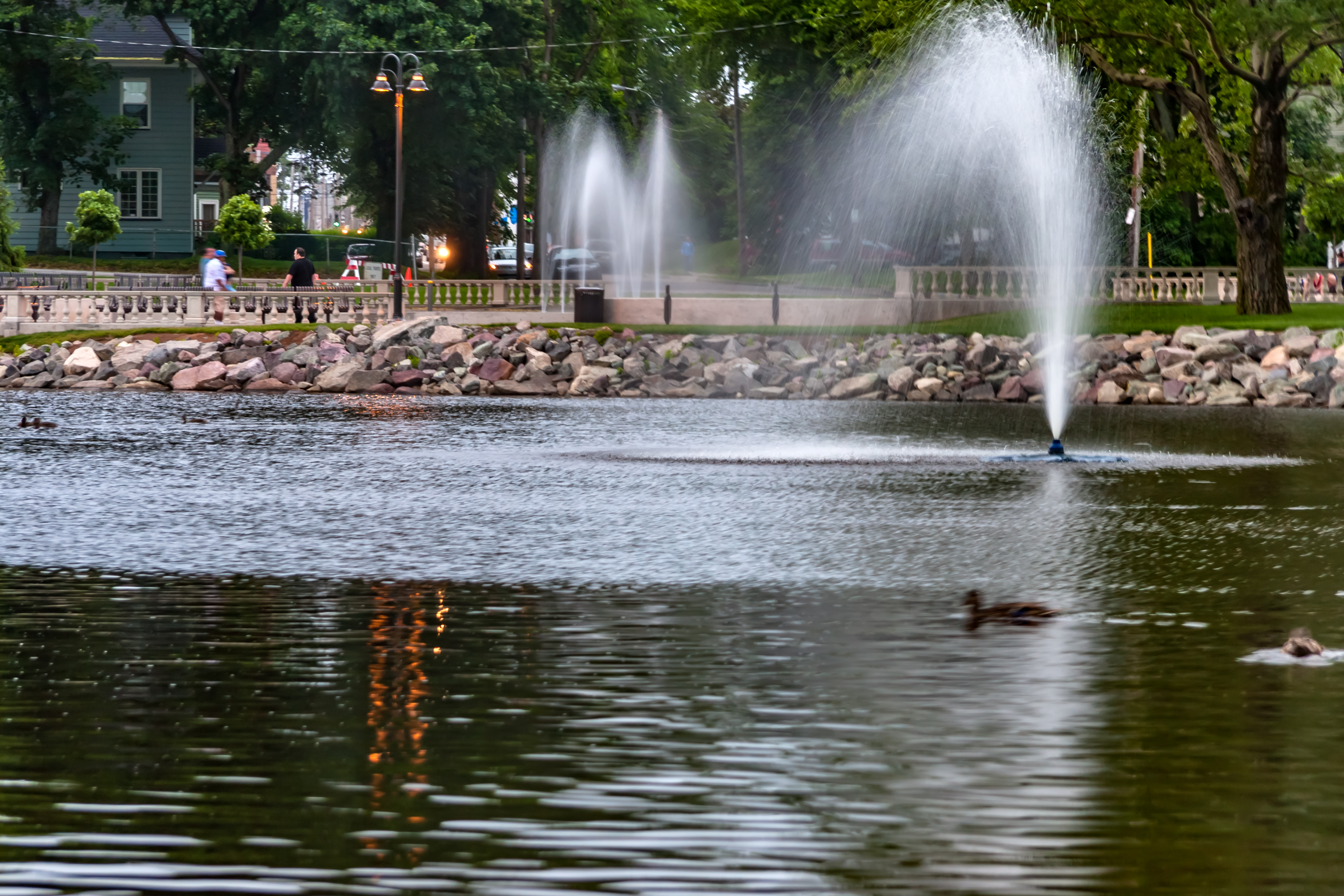
Wentworth Park fountains & West Pond

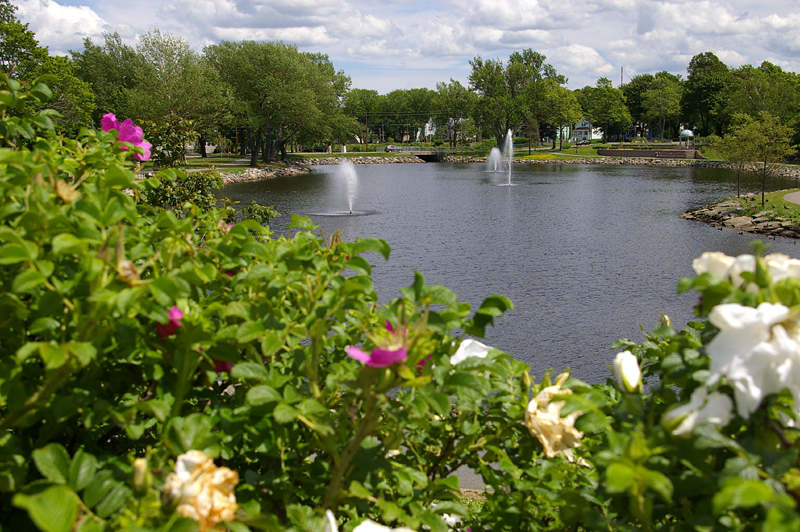
Wentworth Park fountains & West Pond

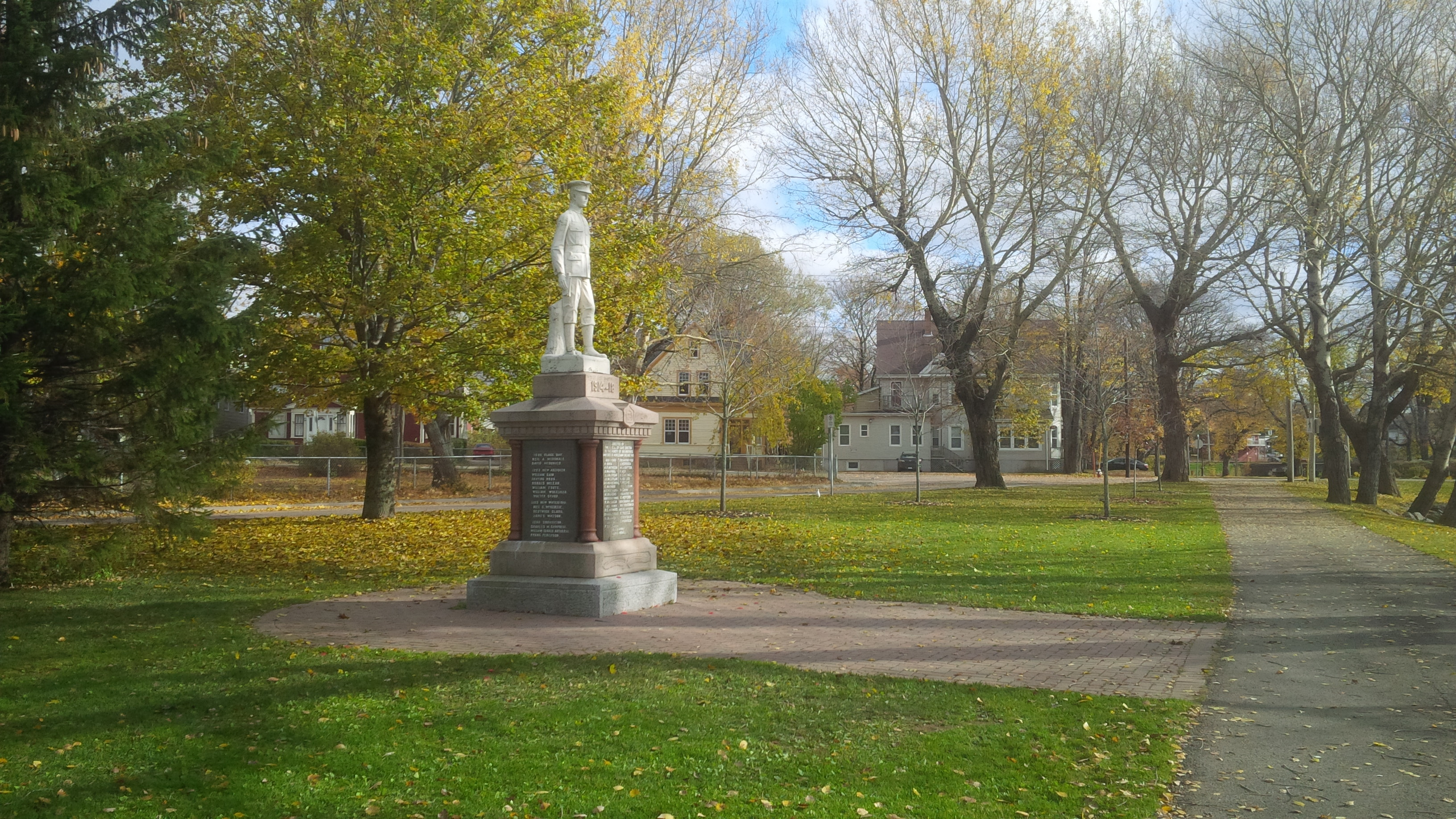
The Orangemen War Memorial
