= Transit Cape Breton =

Canadian public transport agency

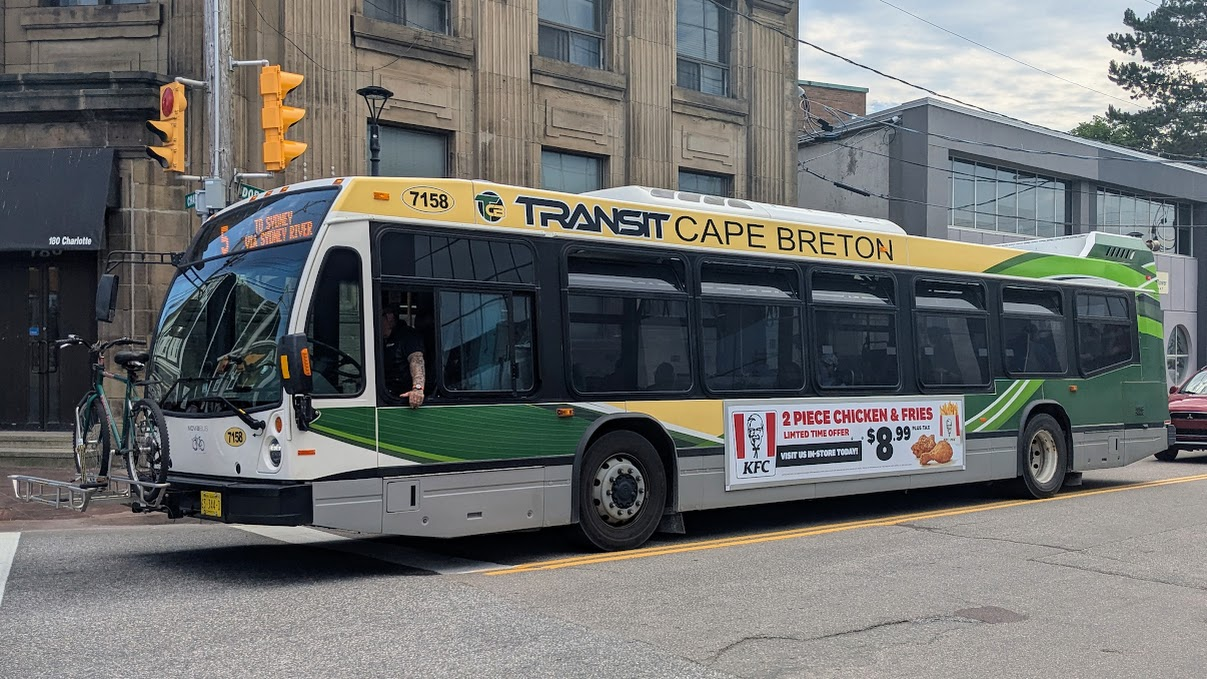
- Transit Cape Breton bus in downtown Sydney
- Parent: Cape Breton Regional Municipality
- Headquarters: 320 Esplanade, Sydney, Nova Scotia
- Service area: CBRM urban areas
- Service type: Bus service
- Routes: 12
- Fleet: 29 transit buses 4 Handi-Trans buses
- Annual ridership: 320,000 in 2013; estimated 580,000 in 2018.
- Fuel type: diesel
- Operator: Engineering and Public Works Department, CBRM
- Website: cbrm.ns.ca/transit.html

Transit Cape Breton is a public transport agency operating buses in the Cape Breton Regional Municipality (CBRM), in Nova Scotia, Canada.

Owned by the CBRM, Transit Cape Breton's operations area is the urban core in the eastern part of the municipality, namely Industrial Cape Breton, which includes the communities of Sydney, Glace Bay, North Sydney, Sydney Mines, Reserve Mines, and New Waterford.

Transit Cape Breton also operates "Handi-Trans" for passengers whose disabilities restrict them from using regular bus service. As of October 2019, all Transit Cape Breton buses are wheelchair-accessible.

Formerly, Transit Cape Breton did not operate on Sundays or public holidays, but limited Sunday service between Sydney and Glace Bay, serving Cape Breton University was instituted in September, 2018. This is part of a general service expansion due to rising enrolment at Cape Breton University, which has driven an 80% increase in ridership on Transit Cape Breton between 2016 and 2018. The Transit service acquired 12 more buses in 2018 to cope with the additional loading, bringing the fleet to 33. All 12 additional buses were pre-owned; the Province of Nova Scotia paid for three of them, and Cape Breton University purchased two. Additional bus stops and shelters have been added to cope with the additional student loads.

== See also ==
- Public transport in Canada
