= List of people from Cape Breton =

This is a list of notable people who have lived on Cape Breton Island.

== Arts ==
- Steve Arbuckle, actor from Donkin
- The Barra MacNeils, singing group
- John Beardman, abstract painter
- Kate Beaton, comics artist from Mabou, winner of the 2009 Doug Wright Award for "Best Emerging Talent"
- Nathan Bishop, singer-songwriter from Celtae
- Kay Boutilier, singer, perhaps better known as "My Name is Kay"
- John Allan Cameron, singer-songwriter, from Mabou, credited as the "godfather" of Cape Breton's modern Celtic music revival
- Ronald Caplan, historian, publisher, member of the Order of Canada
- Lynn Coady, author, winner of the 2013 Scotiabank Giller Prize
- Nathan Cohen, theatre critic, broadcaster, publisher
- J. P. Cormier, singer-songwriter; fiddle, mandolin, banjo, guitar player; Chéticamp
- Lee Cremo, fiddle player
- Mark Day, film and television actor, writer, and producer
- Aselin Debison, singer-songwriter
- Don Domanski, poet
- Carolyn Dunn, film and television actor from Whitney Pier
- Winston "Scotty" Fitzgerald, fiddle player from White Point
- Robert Frank, photographer
- Danny Gallivan, Hockey Night in Canada sportscaster
- John Gracie, singer-songwriter
- Bruce Guthro, singer-songwriter
- Drake Jensen, singer-songwriter
- Rita Joe, Mi'kmaw poet and songwriter
- Angus MacAskill, giant and circus performer
- Allie MacDonald, actress
- Frankie MacDonald, YouTube phenomenon and winner of the Vital Cape Breton Excellence Award
- Martin MacDonald, orchestral conductor
- Mitch MacDonald, singer-songwriter
- Linden MacIntyre, journalist, broadcaster, novelist, winner of 2009 Giller Prize
- Ashley MacIsaac, fiddle player
- Veronica MacIsaac, fashion designer who specialises in tartan
- Daniel MacIvor, actor, playwright, theatre director and film director
- Billy MacLellan, actor (Nobody, Defiance, Murdoch Mysteries)
- Hugh MacLennan, Governor General's Awards-winning author, professor of English at McGill University. He won five Governor General's Awards and a Royal Bank Award
- Alistair MacLeod, author
- Buddy MacMaster, fiddle player
- Natalie MacMaster, fiddle player
- Rita MacNeil, singer-songwriter
- Matt Minglewood, musician
- Farley Mowat, writer, had his summer residence in Cape Breton
- Scott Oake, sportscaster
- Daniel Petrie, Hollywood filmmaker
- The Rankin Family, singers-songwriters
- Molly Rankin, musician from Inverness
- Rick Ravanello, actor, Hart's War; various TV series, including 24, CSI and Desperate Housewives
- Harold Russell, Academy Award-winning actor for his portrayal of Homer Parrish in the 1946 film The Best Years of Our Lives
- Gordie Sampson, singer-songwriter
- Douglas September, singer-songwriter
- Richard Serra, sculptor
- Slowcoaster, rock band
- Amy Spurway, author
- Tom Fun Orchestra, rock band
- Morgan Toney, Mi'kmaw fiddle player
- Scott Turner, songwriter

== Athletics ==
- Paul Boutilier ice hockey
- Norm Ferguson ice hockey
- Trevor Fahey ice hockey
- Aaron Johnson ice hockey
- Andrew MacDonald ice hockey
- Al MacInnis ice hockey
- Mike McPhee ice hockey
- Johnny Miles marathon runner
- Ryan Rozicki cruiserweight boxer
- Bobby Smith ice hockey
- Doug Sulliman ice hockey
- Kevin Morrison ice hockey
- Logan Shaw ice hockey

== Politics, the law, and business ==
- John George Bourinot (younger), 3rd Clerk of the House of Commons (Canada)
- John Buchanan, Premier of Nova Scotia
- Gerald Butts, former Principal Secretary to Prime Minister Justin Trudeau
- William Davis, coal miner murdered by British Empire Steel Corporation police and namesake of Davis Day in New Waterford, Nova Scotia
- Mayann Francis, first Black Lieutenant Governor of Nova Scotia
- Clarence Gillis, Member of Parliament
- Ruth Goldbloom, philanthropist, member of the Order of Canada
- Alasdair Graham, Senator
- Gordon Sidney Harrington, Premier of Nova Scotia
- Alexander Graham Bell
- Angus L. MacDonald, Premier of Nova Scotia
- Donald MacDonald, President of the Canadian Labour Congress and MLA
- Finlay MacDonald, Senator
- Rodney MacDonald, Premier of Nova Scotia
- Allan MacEachen, Deputy Prime Minister, Finance Minister
- Russell MacLellan, Premier of Nova Scotia
- Kevin S. MacLeod, Canadian Secretary to the Queen
- Donald Marshall, Jr., wrongly convicted Mi’kmaq activist
- David Mathews, former Mayor of New York City under the British during the American Revolution
- Elizabeth May, leader of the Green Party of Canada
- J.B. McLachlan, trade-unionist, journalist, political activist, and revolutionary
- John W. Morgan, Mayor of Cape Breton Regional Municipality
- Robert Muir, Member of Parliament; Senator
- George Henry Murray, Premier of Nova Scotia
- Lisa Raitt, Conservative MP and former federal Minister of Transport, Labour and Natural Resources
- Irving Schwartz, businessman, philanthropist, member of the Order of Canada
- Alexander S. Williams, NYPD officer, candidate for US Senate

== Religion ==
- Moses Coady, Roman Catholic priest, helped found the Co-operative Antigonish Movement at St. Francis Xavier University
- Moses E. Kiley, Roman Catholic archbishop of the Roman Catholic Archdiocese of Milwaukee, Milwaukee, Wisconsin
- Reverend Norman McLeod, Presbyterian minister, St Ann's; migrated in the 1850s with 800 settlers from surrounding communities to Waipu, New Zealand
- James "Father Jimmy" Tompkins, Roman Catholic priest, helped found the Co-operative Antigonish Movement at St. Francis Xavier University

== Sciences ==
- Walter Mackenzie, Dr. - Dean of Medicine, University of Alberta, Edmonton
- Arthur B. McDonald, astrophysicist and joint winner of the 2015 Nobel Prize in Physics

== Other ==
- John Bernard Croak V.C.
- Neil McLean, a New Zealand public works contractor and sportsman
- Isaac Phills, Order of Canada recipient

== See also ==
- List of people from Nova Scotia
