= Carex tenax =

Conservation status
- Apparently Secure (NatureServe)

Scientific classification
- Kingdom: Plantae
- Clade: Tracheophytes
- Clade: Angiosperms
- Clade: Monocots
- Clade: Commelinids
- Order: Poales
- Family: Cyperaceae
- Genus: Carex
- Species: C. tenax

Binomial name
- Carex tenax Chapm. ex Dewey
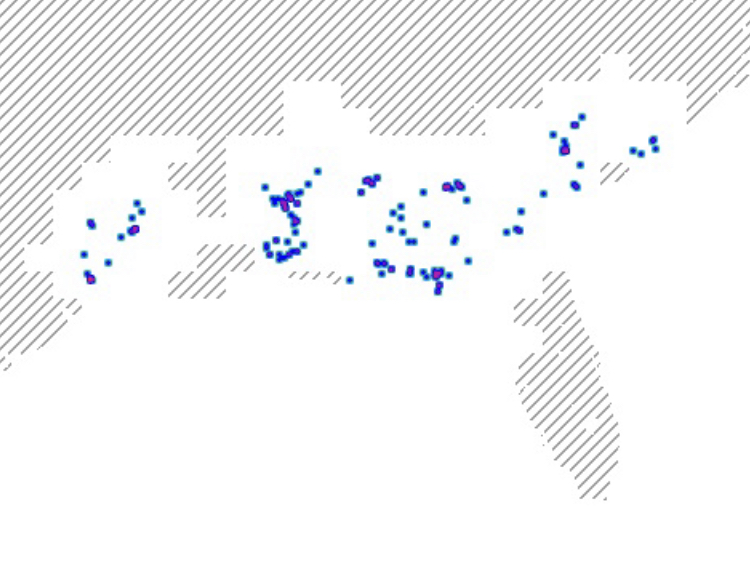

Synonyms
- Carex chapmanii Sartwell ex Dewey; Carex chapmanii Sartwell ex L.H.Bailey; Carex dasycarpa var. tenax (Chapm. ex Dewey) Kük.

Species of flowering plant

Carex tenax, the wire sedge, is a species of flowering plant in the family Cyperaceae, native to Texas and the southeastern United States.

== Description ==
It is a perennial plant that gets up to 20 inches. The roots are fibrous. The alternate leaves are linear and parallel. The leaves are covered with short hairs. The inflorescence is a spike. The fruit are achenes. The flowers are really small and hard to see. The perigynia is ovoid or obovoid and the hairs are not longer than 0.2 mm. It flowers between later spring and early summer.

== Distribution and habitat ==
It is found in most of the counties in Western Florida including, Bay, Calhoun, Escambia, Gadsden, Holmes, Jackson, Liberty, Okaloosa, Santa Rosa, Walton, and Washington counties.

It has a global rank of G4, meaning apparently secure. It also has local state ranks, including, S1 in Texas and North Carolina meaning critically endangered, S2 in Alabama meaning endangered, S3 in Florida and Louisiana meaning imperiled, and S4 in Mississippi meaning apparently secure. Its population is in a decline of between 10-30%.

Generally rare, it is found in the longleaf pine ecosystem. It is commonly found in the elevations of between 0-1,000 feet. It is most commonly found in the sand habitat and the forest habitat.
