= Neil McLean =

Neil McLean may refer to:

- Neil McLean (judge) (1759–1832), judge and political figure in Upper Canada
- Neil McLean (politician) (1918–1986), British Army officer and politician, former Conservative MP for Inverness
- Neil McLean (saxophonist), American saxophonist and arranger, former member of the SuperJazz Big Band and the Magic City Jazz Orchestra
- Neil McLean (sportsman) (1857–1939), New Zealand public works contractor and sportsman
- Neil MacLean (coroner) (1944–2022), New Zealand's first Chief Coroner

== See also ==
- Neil Maclean (1875–1953), Scottish socialist and MP for Glasgow Govan
