= Beardman =

Beardman is a surname. Notable people with the surname include:

- John Beardman (born 1937), American artist
- Mahli Beardman (born 2005), Australian cricketer
