= Province of Cape Breton Island =

Political movement in Nova Scotia, Canada

Unofficial flag of Cape Breton Island

Province of Cape Breton Island is a political movement which calls for the reseparation of Cape Breton Island from the province of Nova Scotia and for it to be governed as a province in its own right. Cape Breton was governed as a separate colony between 1784 and 1820, when it was merged with Nova Scotia. There have been other movements for the establishment of a province of Cape Breton Island before this one, but the most recent commenced in February 2000 when a meeting in Baddeck led by Scott MacLean of Sydney, Nova Scotia, was attended by about 200 Cape Bretoners seeking to form their own province or invoking some form of political change in response to an economy in crisis on the island. A subsequent meeting was held on Remembrance Day, November 11, 2000, in Sydney with about 300 attending including local officials and politicians e.g. Gerald Sampson, Kenzie MacNeil, Fraser Morrison, and Danny Hanson. The meetings also drew the attention of Senators Bernard Boudreau and Lowell Murray who raised the matter on the floor of the Canadian Senate with no decision or action being taken.

The movement continued throughout 2000 and 2001 with Cape Breton University hosting a series of meetings. CBU's initiative set forth that one of the initial steps in the process of greater independence and self-reliance for Cape Breton Island is to look at the jurisdictional power held within CBI's Municipal Governments and find ways to augment and leverage it for economic growth. To that end the Cape Breton Island Branch of the North Atlantic Island Program [NAIP(CBI)], hosted by the Community Economic Development (CED) Institute, held meetings at Cape Breton University over the year focusing on the relationship between jurisdictional authority and self-reliant economic development. The meetings were attended by local leaders and politicians including; Wendy MacDonald, Vince MacLean, Dr. Gertrude MacIntyre, Director, CED Institute, Mayor Billy Joe MacLean, Donnie Rowe, John R MacDonald, Craig Pollett, Bill Stirling, Scott Dawe, and John Whalley. During 2001–2002 discussions and meetings on the topic of Cape Breton Island's governance continued and the Cape Breton Regional Municipality led by Mayor John Morgan commissioned Memorial University of Newfoundland to independently study the governance and economic crisis on Cape Breton Island for problem identification and a possible solution set. The study by Dr. Wade Locke and Dr. Stephen Tomblin was completed October 21, 2003. The study found that the depopulation and de-economization of Cape Breton Island would continue if the status quo was maintained. The study indicated that Cape Breton Island is paying the Province of Nova Scotia based on the 2002 fiscal year an excess of $12 million annually in taxation versus the expenditures it receives in return from Nova Scotia.

In May 2005 a further study supporting governance and economic issues on Cape Breton Island was completed by Dr. Paul Hobson (Department of Economics, Acadia University), Dr. David Cameron (Department of Political Science, Dalhousie University) and Dr. Wade Locke (formerly of Memorial University), entitled "A Question of Balance—An Assessment of the State of Local Government in Nova Scotia", Union of Nova Scotia Municipalities Report, May 24, 2005.

In response to the findings of these studies Mayor John Morgan and Cape Breton Regional Municipality (Cape Breton Island's largest municipal government) commenced discussions and negotiations with the Province of Nova Scotia which after failure by Nova Scotia to recognize CBRM's complaints resulted in the filing of a lawsuit by CBRM against the Province of Nova Scotia for what it claims are arbitrary and capricious fiscal improprieties—to the tune of $12 million per year.

In November 2006 the popular support for the movement was rekindled by Mark Macneill of Mabou, Nova Scotia, who responded to federal House of Commons' Québécois nation motion recognizing "that the Québécois form a nation within a united Canada" by advocating that Cape Breton Island is also irrefutably a distinct society and as such should be recognized as a province within a province with a devolutionary view to reestablishing the island as its own separate entity and as the 11th province within Canada. Prominent members of the community have come out in support of the movement including former Mayor John W. Morgan, Kenzie MacNeil, Anna Curtis-Steele, Brian Joseph, PhD. (Harvard) and many others.

In 2019, Nova Scotians for Equalization Fairness did a poll where out of 1000 Cape Bretoners surveyed, 500 were in favour of separating from the province and forming the 11th Canadian Province of Cape Breton out of dissatisfaction with the provincial government's treatment of the island.
