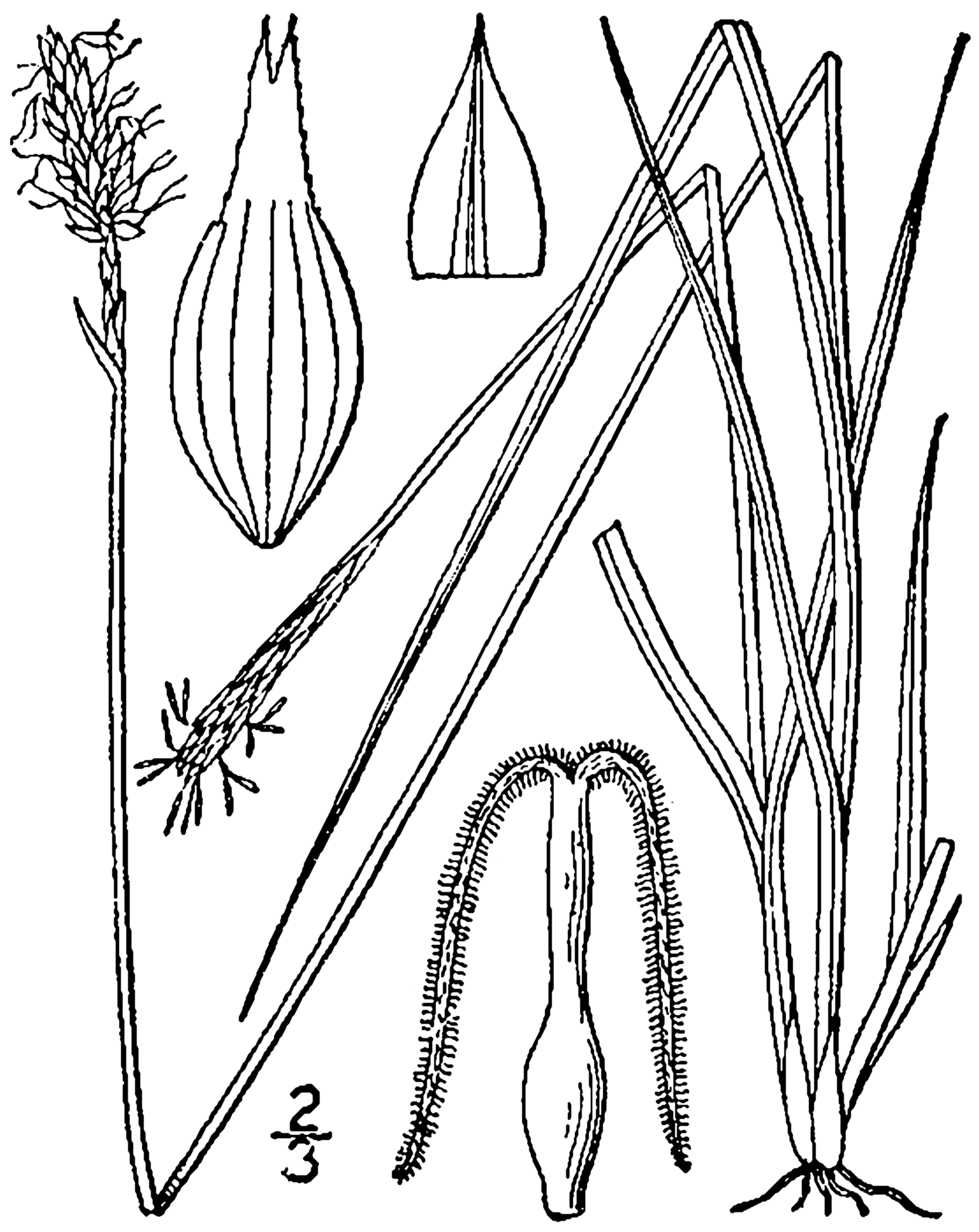

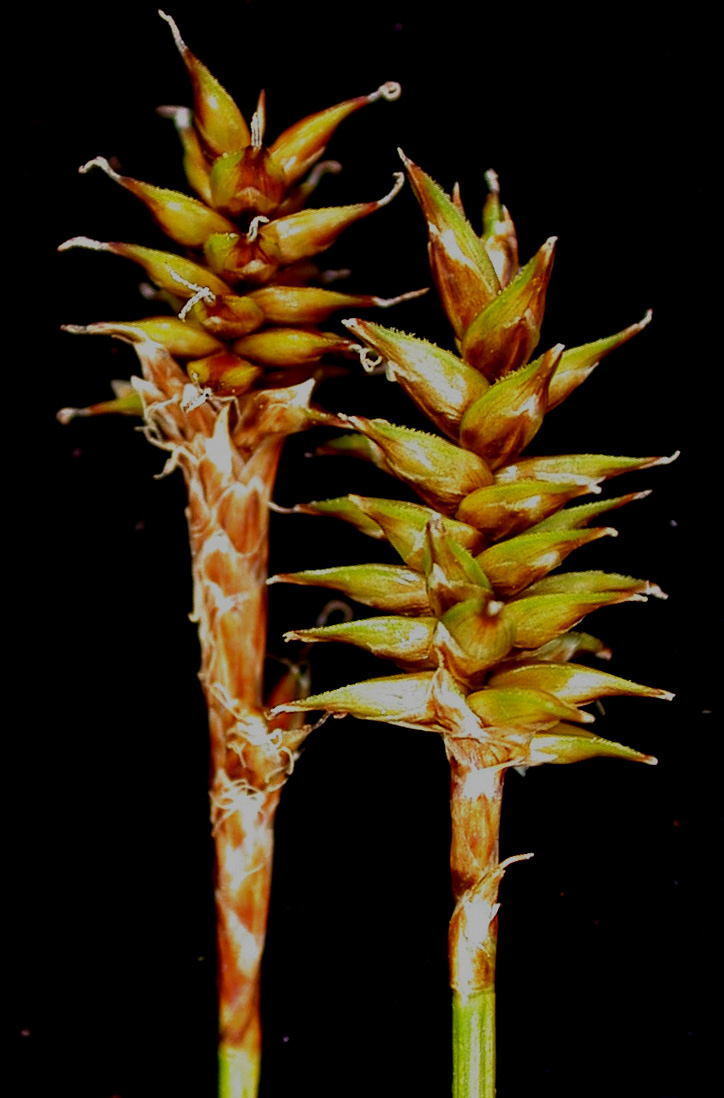

Conservation status
- Least Concern (IUCN 3.1)

Scientific classification
- Kingdom: Plantae
- Clade: Embryophytes
- Clade: Tracheophytes
- Clade: Spermatophytes
- Clade: Angiosperms
- Clade: Monocots
- Clade: Commelinids
- Order: Poales
- Family: Cyperaceae
- Genus: Carex
- Subgenus: Carex subg. Vignea
- Section: Carex sect. Stellulatae
- Species: C. exilis

Binomial name
- Carex exilis Dewey

Synonyms
- Vignea exilis Dewey Raf.; Carex exilis var. androgyna Dewey; Carex exilis var. squamacea Dewey

= Carex exilis =

Species of grass-like plant in the sedge family

Carex exilis, common name coastal sedge or meager sedge, is a species of grass-like plant in the Cyperaceae family. It is native to North America and Canada, with several disjunct populations from southern Canada to the Gulf Coast.

== Description ==
Carex exilis is a densely tufted, tussock-forming plant, with stiff, smooth stems reaching 12–80 cm (4.7–31.5 in). in height. Leaves number between 2–6 per stem. Inflorescences usually take the form of solitary spikes.

== Conservation status ==
Although not classed as a conservation risk by the IUCN across most of its distribution range, it is listed as an endangered species in Connecticut by state authorities.
