= Celtae (band) =

Canadian Celtic band

- Origin: Ottawa, Ontario, Canada
- Genres: Celtic
- Years active: 2001–2008
- Members: Nathan MacDonald; Tyree Lush; Matt Holland; Dana Arrowsmith

Celtae /ˈkɛlteɪ/ was a Canadian band, formed in 2001 in Ottawa, playing neo-Celtic music. The band was founded by Nathan MacDonald of Cape Breton Island, and included Matt Holland of Summerside, Prince Edward Island and Tyree Lush of Gambo, Newfoundland and Labrador. Original fiddler Jules Sisk left the band, and was replaced by Dana Arrowsmith of Sudbury, Ontario.

The album No Regrets was produced by Brian Talbot of the band Slainte Mhath. Critic Wes Smiderle of the Ottawa Citizen wrote, "The tone is cheerful, end-of-the-work-week acoustic venting, with lyrical nods to the rigours of East Coast history, much like Great Big Sea".

== Members ==
- Nathan MacDonald – vocals, guitar
- Tyree Lush – vocals, guitar, button accordion, mandolin
- Matt Holland – bass
- Dana Arrowsmith – fiddle, vocals

=== Nathan MacDonald ===
Nathan Bishop MacDonald better known as "Nathan Bishop" is a singer-songwriter based in Toronto, Ontario, Canada. He was a founding member of Celtae, which was based in Ottawa, and also performs original music under the name "Nathan Bishop".

MacDonald was born in Sydney, Nova Scotia, Canada and raised in Glace Bay on Cape Breton Island in Nova Scotia. His song "Merchant Marine" was used as the theme song for Paul Ciufo's CBC radio drama, On Convoy. The same song was included on Avondale Records' 2004 release, Singalongs & Shanties 2. MacDonald is a baritone singer who performs music on guitar, but is also known for his bodhran playing. He has an eclectic musical history. MacDonald has performed at major festivals throughout Canada including the Canadian Tulip Festival, The Lunenburg Folk Harbour Festival, The Regina Mosaic Multicultural Festival and more. He has also performed at prestigious venues such as the National Arts Centre, in Ottawa, The Savoy Theatre in Glace Bay, Cape Breton, and Centre Point Theatre in Ottawa.

The Nathan Bishop project has been a sharp departure from his previous Celtic roots. The Ottawa Citizen referred to these compositions as "funky folk". In September 2008, Nathan Bishop moved to Toronto and began construction of Uptown Underground recording studio. On June 1, 2011, he released his debut solo album Lovers, Leavers, and Believers under his Uptown Underground record label. Two songs from this album were chosen to be used in the 2011 Manuel H. Da Silva film The Unleashed.

A demo version of Bishop's song "Without You" was a finalist in the 2008 International Songwriting Competition.

Bishop's refers to his music as 'Chop Music', a post-hip hop form of roots rock.

==== Education ====
While attending the University of Guelph and the University of Western Ontario, MacDonald was one of Canada's most successful inter-varsity debaters. He won consecutive North American Debating Championships in 1998 and 1999, and was the Vice-President of the Canadian University Society for Intercollegiate Debate. He was also the fifth-place public speaker in world at the 2000 World Universities Debating Championships in Sydney.
