= Ronald Caplan =

Ronald Caplan CM
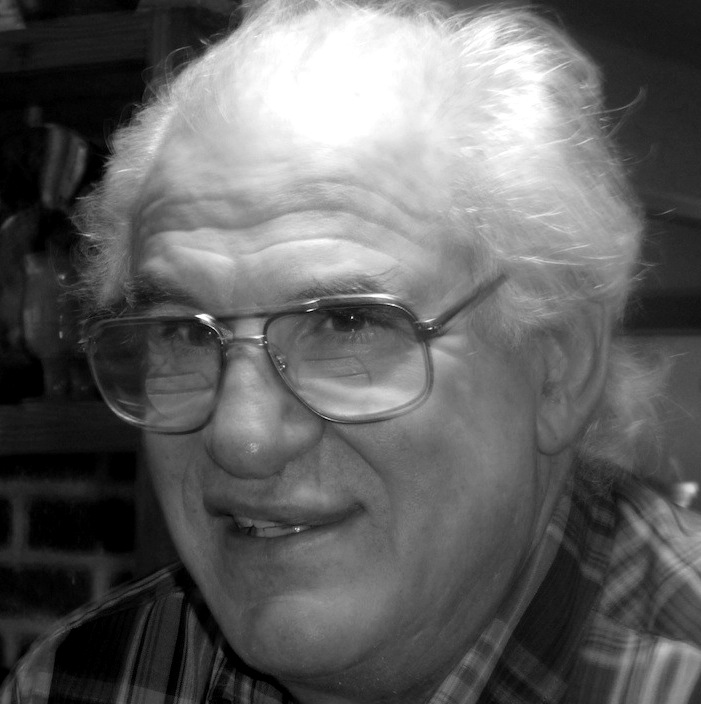
- Ron Caplan in the Cape Breton Island Highlands, January 2011, shortly after being appointed to the Order of Canada
- Born: 1945 (age 80–81); Pittsburgh, Pennsylvania
- Occupation: Publisher
- Years active: 1972–present
- Known for: Cape Breton's Magazine
- Awards: Order of Canada

Ronald (Ron) Caplan, CM (born 1945) is a publisher, writer, folk-historian, and Member of the Order of Canada.

Born in Pittsburgh, Pennsylvania, in 1945, Ronald Caplan emigrated to Canada in 1971. He moved to Canada's Maritimes and, in 1972, he and his young family settled down in Cape Breton Island's Highlands region, and began chronicling the local history. This was a region where Canadian Gaelic – a dialect of Scottish Gaelic – was still the predominant language spoken by people in the area, but was quickly being replaced by English. Sensing that he would have only a time-limited opportunity to record this culture before its native speakers died off, he founded Cape Breton's Magazine in 1972, to record the culture and living history of the island and its people. Foxfire Magazine provided the inspiration for the magazine's design and layout, while Robert Frank influenced his photographic style. His audio recordings and photographs are a lasting record of this way of life that has mostly disappeared. He was appointed to the Order of Canada on 30 December 2010 for his work on the magazine, and as the publisher of the Breton Books imprint.
