= Veronica MacIsaac =

Canadian fashion designer

Veronica MacIsaac is a Canadian fashion designer who specialises in contemporary womenswear made from traditional Scottish tartan fabrics and with Celtic motifs.

== Biography ==
MacIsaac was raised in Cape Breton, Nova Scotia, Canada, and is based in Halifax, Nova Scotia. Her parents are traditional kiltmakers and MacIsaac began sewing when she was aged 4. Her brother Matt MacIsaac is a bagpiper and Celtic musician.

MacIsaac founded Veronica MacIsaac Apparel and specialises in contemporary womenswear made from traditional Scottish tartan fabrics and with Celtic motifs. Her designs have featured in international fashion publications including British Vogue and Vogue Italia.

In 2008, MacIsaac showed in the "Emerging Designer Showcase" of Amsterdam Fashion Week in the Netherlands.

In 2016, MacIsaac held a show at the Maritime Museum of the Atlantic in Halifax. She designed a tartan for the 75th anniversary of the group Les Cercle des Fermières Varennes du Québec.

In 2019, MacIsaac designed a green, red, black, gold, white and tan tartan in honour of the Nova Scotia Legislature's 200th anniversary, which was unveiled by the Speaker of the House of Assembly, Kevin Murphy, and Gaelic Affairs Minister, Randy Delorey. This was the first time in Canada that a Legislative Assembly had its own tartan.

Also in 2019, MacIsaac held her first fashion show on Cape Breton Island at the Bras d'Or Lakes Inn in St. Peter's, and was part of "The Fabric of our DNA" fashion show alongside Donn Sabean, tREv Clothing, Michelle Rober Fashion, Fervente Canada and African Apparel.

During the COVID-19 pandemic, MacIsaac created Nova Scotia and Cape Breton tartan face masks and donated the proceeds to charity.

In 2021, MacIsaac was featured as a clue in a New Yorker crossword. She created a couture gown made out of toilet paper for a cancer society fundraiser. She has also participated in events for the Fredericton Society of St Andrew Pipe Band.

In 2022, MacIsaac designed a tartan for the Halifax Gay Men's Chorus (HGMC).
