= Neil McLean (sportsman) =

New Zealand public works contractor and sportsman

Neil McLean (4 August 1857–5 May 1939) was a New Zealand public works contractor and sportsman. He was born on Cape Breton Island, Nova Scotia, British North America on 4 August 1857.
