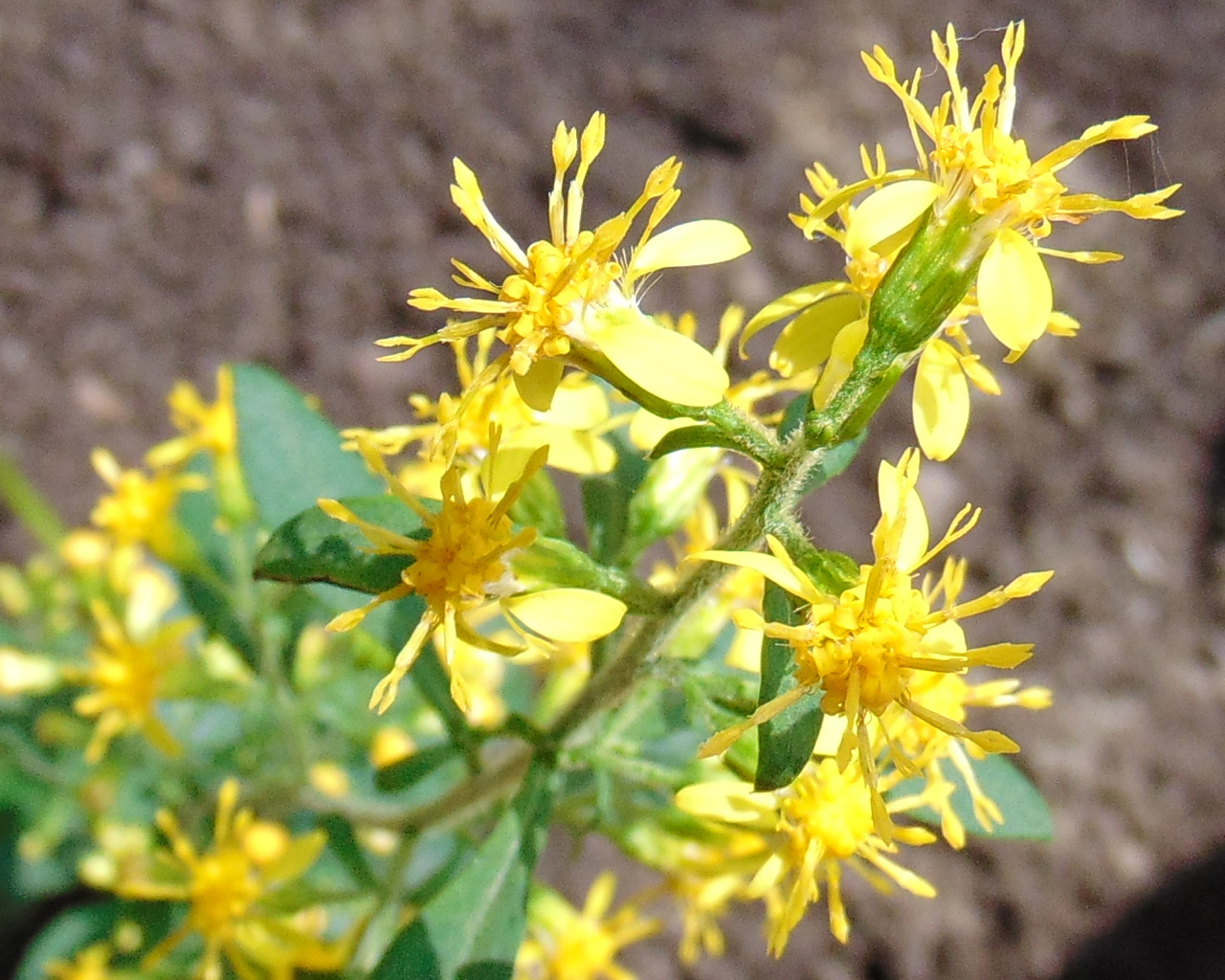

Scientific classification
- Kingdom: Plantae
- Clade: Tracheophytes
- Clade: Angiosperms
- Clade: Eudicots
- Clade: Asterids
- Order: Asterales
- Family: Asteraceae
- Genus: Solidago
- Species: S. macrophylla

Binomial name
- Solidago macrophylla Banks ex Pursh 1813 not Schloss. & Vuk. 1869 nor Bigel. 1824

Synonyms
- Aster thyrsoideus (E.Mey.) Kuntze; Solidago mensalis Fernald; Solidago thyrsoidea E.Mey.

= Solidago macrophylla =

Species of flowering plant

Solidago macrophylla, the largeleaf goldenrod or large-leaved goldenrod, is North American species of herbaceous perennial plants of the family Asteraceae. It is native to eastern and central Canada (from Ontario to Newfoundland & Labrador) and the north-eastern United States (New York and New England). Some of the populations in Québec and Labrador lie north of the Arctic Circle.

Solidago macrophylla is a perennial herb up to 105 cm (42 inches) tall, with a thick woody rhizome. Leaves can be up to 15 cm (6 inches) long. One plant can produce 110 or more small yellow flower heads, mostly on short side branches.

== Galls ==
This species is host to the following insect induced gall:

- Asteromyia modesta (Felt, 1907)

external link to gallformers
