= John Beardman =

American artist (born 1937)

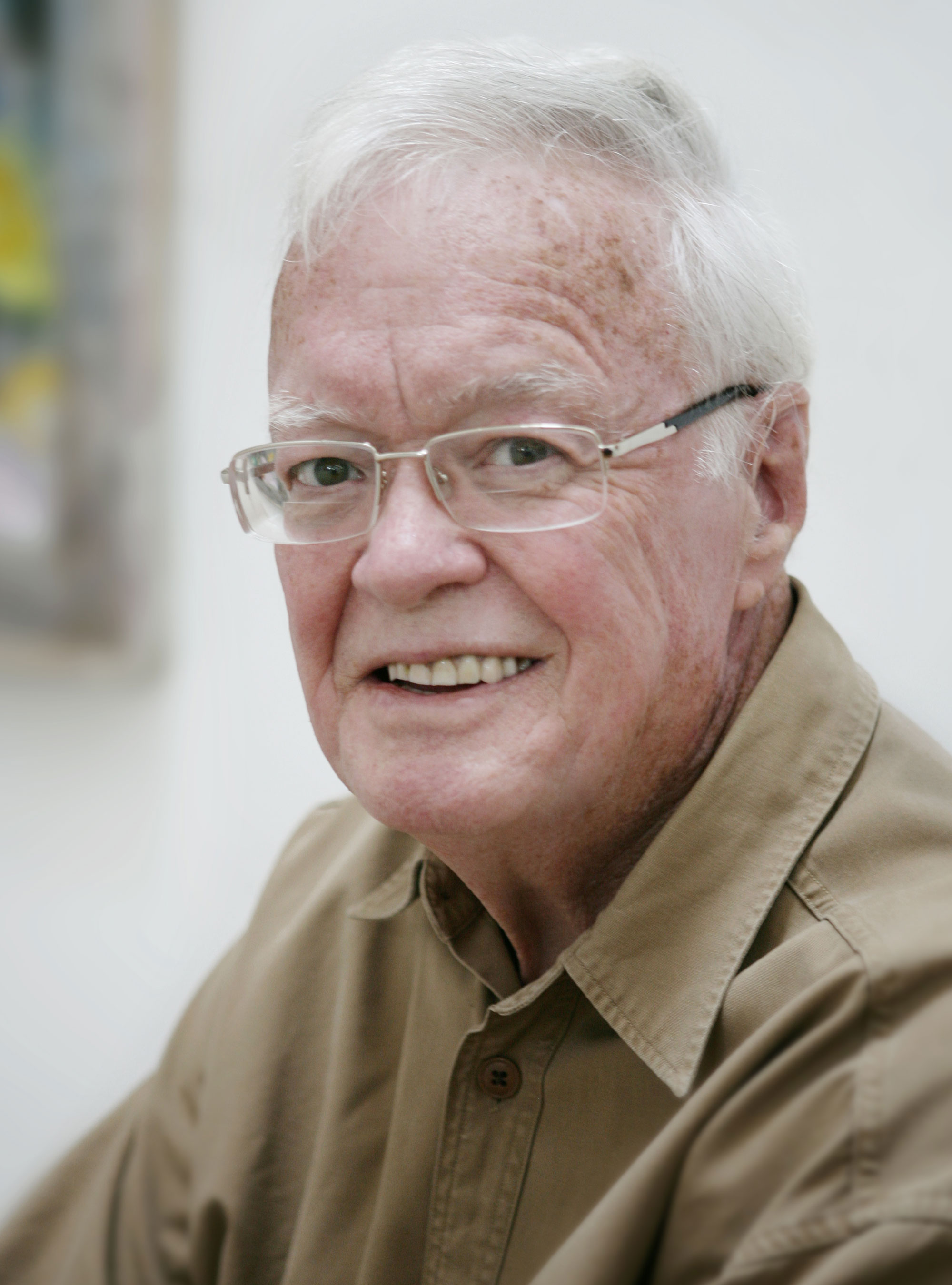
- John Beardman in 2015
- Born: December 5, 1937 (age 88); Youngstown, Ohio, U.S.
- Education: Case Western Reserve University, Oberlin College, Southern Illinois University, University of Paris, Artelier 17 with Stanley William Hayter
- Known for: Painting, Abstract expressionism

John Beardman (born December 5, 1937, in Youngstown, Ohio) is a contemporary American artist. He is an abstract expressionist and a major contributor to “art as process” and "action painting" influenced by Willem de Kooning. His work has been the subject of several exhibitions in New York City, Louisville, Kentucky, Birmingham, Michigan, and Nova Scotia, Canada. Beardman has received numerous creative artist's grants and fellowships. He currently lives and works in Pennsylvania and has a Studio in Manhattan, New York City.

== Life and work ==
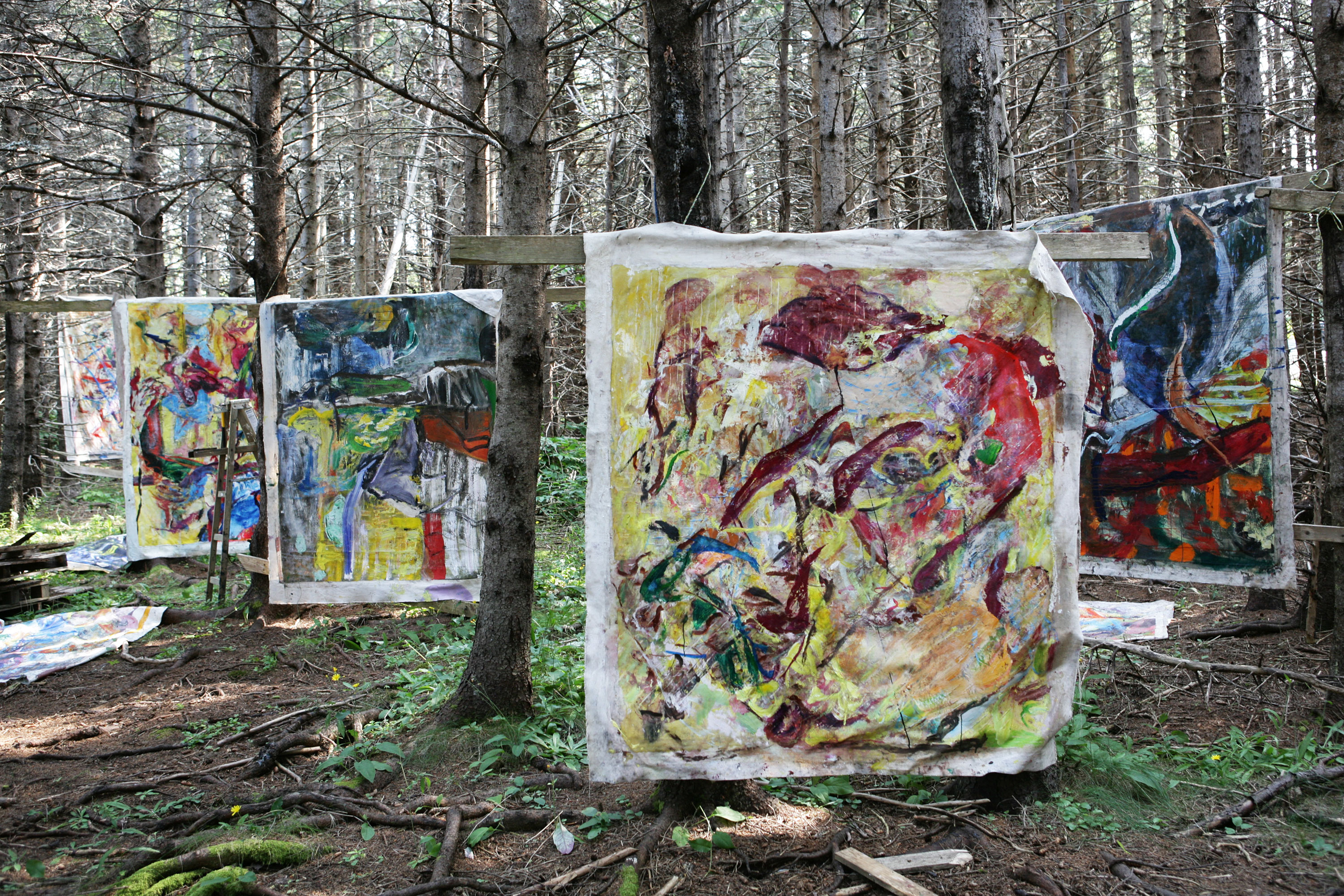
Studio in the Woods, 2015, Cape Breton

John Beardman was born in Youngstown, Ohio December 5, 1937.

At the age of twelve he moved with his family to a farm outside of Warren, Ohio, and started painting at the age of nineteen. He was first intrigued with gesture painting and was later influenced by Dutch-American abstract expressionist Willem de Kooning.

Beardman studied at Case Western Reserve University, Oberlin College and Southern Illinois University. In the 60s he also studied with Stanley William Hayter at his Atelier 17 in Paris and at the University of Paris and received a certificate.

He earned his living as art professor at the University of Connecticut, Cranbrook Educational Community, Academy of Art and Oakland University from 1961 to 1990.

From 1992 to 2016 Beardman did most of his art work in his “Studio in the Woods” in Cape Breton Island, Nova Scotia, Canada. He also made an open-air exhibition in 2008 "A Song of the Woods" at his Canadian studio.

Beardman has exhibited at various galleries, including one person exhibitions in New York City at Carter Burden Gallery, Noho M55 Gallery, Denise Bibro Fine Art, Inc., Allan Stone Gallery, OK Harris Works of Art, Jayne H. Baum and 55 Mercer Galleries. In Louisville, Kentucky, he has exhibited at the Brownstown Gallery and in Birmingham, Michigan, at Art Space.

He has works in both public and private collections including NBC, HDH Corp, Best Products, Harry Bober, Allan Stone, Leonard Goldenson, Cornel West, Cranbrook Educational Community, Academy of Art, Detroit Institute of Arts, Hudson River Museum and Carter Burden Center.

Testimonials have come from critics Donald Kuspit, April Kingsley and Karen Chambers and from art historians Meyer Schapiro, and Albert Elsen.
