= Chester Dewey =

American botanist, antislavery activist, clergyman and educator

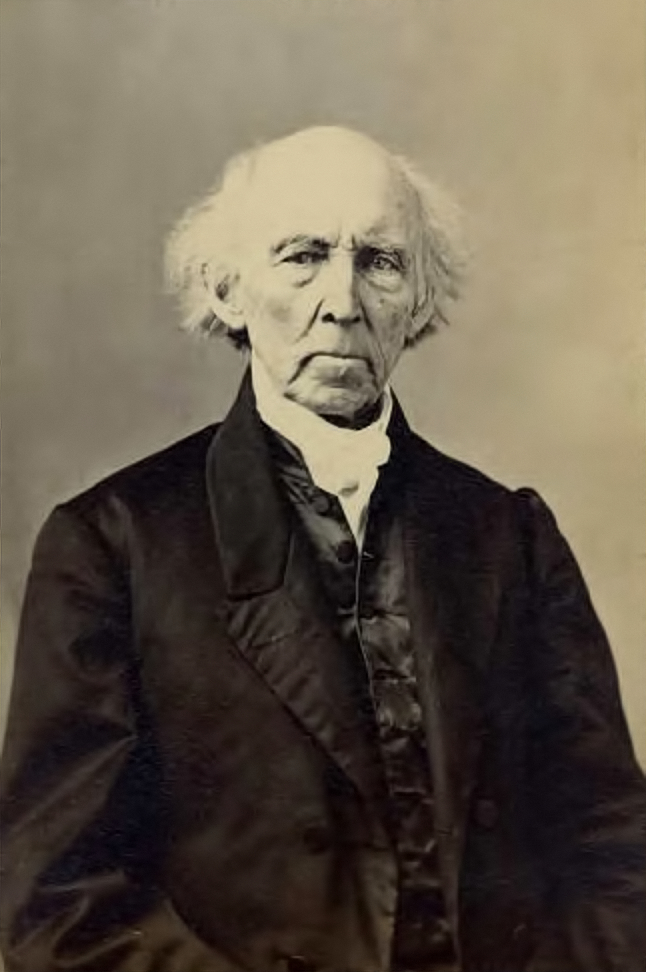
Chester Dewey in 1865

Chester Dewey (October 25, 1784 – December 15, 1867) was an American botanist, antislavery activist, clergyman and educator.

== Early life ==
Chester Dewey was born in Sheffield, Massachusetts, on October 25, 1784, to Elizabeth Owen and Stephen Dewey. He studied for the ministry at Williams College, graduated in 1806, and officiated at Tryingham, Massachusetts. Even though he gave up preaching as his primary profession after only a few months, he never really retired from the pulpit. He also assisted his brother, Loring D. Dewey in his efforts to create a school of U.S. Blacks. For the remainder of his life he accepted frequent invitations to preach, in scores of churches in a number of places and did nearly as much work of this kind as if preaching were his only occupation. Dewey was professor of mathematics and natural philosophy at Williams College from 1810 to 1827. He was elected an Associate Fellow of the American Academy of Arts and Sciences in 1818. From 1850 until 1860 he was professor of chemistry and natural philosophy in the University of Rochester.

== Personal life ==
Dr. Dewey married Sarah Dewey of Stockbridge, Mass., in 1810 and had five children. She died in 1823. In 1825 he married Olivia Hart, eldest child of Lemuel Pomeroy, Jr., of Pittsfield, Mass.

== Career ==
Dewey's entire life was given to scientific pursuits, and he held a high position among American naturalists. He made the study of grasses a specialty, and discovered and described several new species. The degree of M.D. was conferred upon him by Yale in 1825, D.D. by Union in 1838 and LL.D. by Williams in 1850. He was a careful and accurate observer of the weather, and his notes were published in regular monthly reports. His papers on some of the "Families and Natural Orders of Plants", published in the American Journal of Science, attracted the attention of some of the leading European botanists, and led to a correspondence with them. In the class of "carices" he was a recognized authority, and his writings on that subject make an elaborate monograph, upon which he labored for more than forty years. His "History of the Herbaceous Plants of Massachusetts" was published by that state. His latest writings were review articles on "The True Place of Man in Zoology" and "An Examination of Some Reasonings Against the Unity of Mankind."

In botany, Dewey is known chiefly as a student of the genus Carex. For 43 years (1824–1867) he contributed to the pages of the American Journal of Science a series of papers entitled "Caricography". Recognized by his contemporaries as one of the few outstanding authorities on a perplexing and not at all showy group, he seems at the same time to have been looked at askance by the more cautious of them. Dewey's important collections contained 97 types of species and varieties proposed by him.

In 1863, Dewey was elected as a member of the American Philosophical Society.

== Death ==
He died in Rochester, New York, on December 15, 1867. Dewey bequeathed his herbarium, one of the most complete in the country, as well as his carices library, to Williams College.
