= Cape Breton Island =

Island in Nova Scotia, Canada

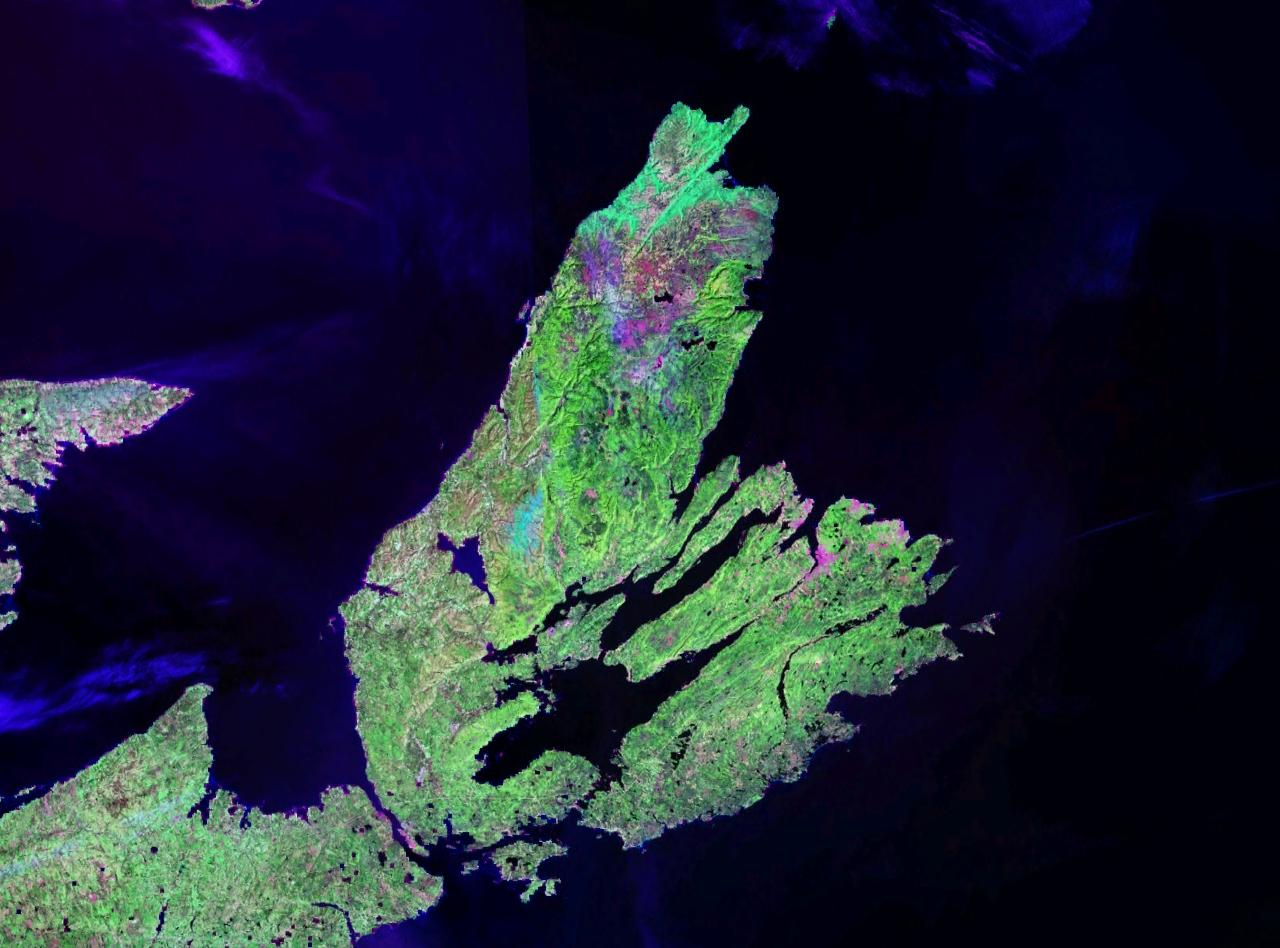

- Location within Nova Scotia Location within Canada

Geography
- Location: Nova Scotia, Canada
- Coordinates: 46°17′42″N 60°40′12″W
- Area: 10,513.17 km^{2} (4,059.16 sq mi)(2026)
- Area rank: 18th in Canada & 74th worldwide
- Highest elevation: 535 m (1755 ft)
- Highest point: White Hill

Administration
- Canada
- Province: Nova Scotia
- Largest settlement: Cape Breton Regional Municipality (pop. 93,694)

Demographics
- Demonym: Cape Bretoner
- Population: 132,019 (2021)
- Pop. density: 12.8/km^{2} (33.2/sq mi)

Cape Breton Island (Note: French: île du Cap-Breton, formerly île Royale; Scottish Gaelic: Ceap Breatainn or Eilean Cheap Bhreatainn; Mi'kmaq: Unama'ki) is a rugged and irregularly shaped island on the Atlantic coast of North America, forming part of the Canadian province of Nova Scotia.

The 10,513.1 km^{2} (4,059.1 sq mi) island accounts for 18.7% of Nova Scotia's total area. Although the island is physically separated from the Nova Scotia peninsula by the Strait of Canso, the 1,385-metre (4,544 ft) long Canso Causeway connects it to mainland Nova Scotia. The island is east-northeast of the mainland with its northern and western coasts fronting on the Gulf of Saint Lawrence with its western coast forming the eastern limits of the Northumberland Strait. The eastern and southern coasts front the Atlantic Ocean with its eastern coast also forming the western limits of the Cabot Strait. Its landmass slopes upward from south to north, culminating in the highlands of its northern cape. A large body of saltwater, the Bras d'Or ("Golden Arm" in French), dominates the island's centre. The 2021 census counted 134,850 Cape Bretoners, which is approximately 15% of the provincial population. Cape Breton Island has experienced a decline in population of approximately 2.9% since the 2011 census. Approximately 75% of the island's population is in the Cape Breton Regional Municipality, which includes all of Cape Breton County and is often referred to as Industrial Cape Breton.

== Toponymy ==
Cape Breton Island takes its name from its easternmost point, Cape Breton. This may have been named after the Gascon fishing port of Capbreton, but more probably takes its name from the Bretons of northwestern France. A Portuguese mappa mundi of 1516–20 includes the label "terra q(ue) foy descuberta por Bertomes" in the vicinity of the Gulf of St. Lawrence, which means "land discovered by Bretons". The name "Cape Breton" first appears on a map of 1516, as C(abo) dos Bretoes, and became the general name for both the island and the cape toward the end of the 16th century. The Breton origin of the name is not universally accepted, however: William Francis Ganong argued that the Portuguese term Bertomes referred to Englishmen or Britons, and that the name should be interpreted as "Cape of the English". The indigenous Mi'kmaq name for the island is Unama'ki, which loosely translates to "land of fog".

== History ==
Cape Breton Island's first residents were likely archaic maritime natives, ancestors of the Mi'kmaq people. These peoples and their progeny inhabited the island (known as Unama'ki) for several thousand years and continue to live there to this day. Their traditional lifestyle centred around hunting and fishing because of the unfavourable agricultural conditions of their maritime home. This ocean-centric lifestyle did, however, make them among the first Indigenous peoples to discover European explorers and sailors fishing in the St. Lawrence Estuary. Italian explorer (sailing for the British crown) John Cabot reportedly visited the island in 1497. However, European histories and maps of the period are of too poor quality to be sure whether Cabot first visited Newfoundland or Cape Breton Island. This discovery is commemorated by Cape Breton's Cabot Trail, and by the Cabot's Landing Historic Site & Provincial Park, near the village of Dingwall. The local Mi'kmaq peoples began trading with European fishermen when the fishermen began landing in their territories as early as the 1520s. In about 1521–22, the Portuguese under João Álvares Fagundes established a fishing colony on the island. As many as two hundred settlers lived in a village, the name of which is not known, located according to some historians at what is now Ingonish on the island's northeastern peninsula. These fishermen traded with the local population but did not maintain a permanent settlement. This Portuguese colony's fate is unknown, but it is mentioned as late as 1570. During the Anglo-French War of 1627 to 1629, under King Charles I, the Kirkes took Quebec City, James Stewart, 4th Lord Ochiltree, planted a colony on Unama'ki at Baleine, Nova Scotia, and Alexander's son, William Alexander, 1st Earl of Stirling, established the first incarnation of "New Scotland" at Port Royal (Annapolis Royal). These claims, and larger ideals of European colonization were the first time the island was incorporated as European territory, though it would be several decades later that treaties would actually be signed. However, no copies of these treaties exist. These Scottish triumphs, which left Cape Sable as the only major French holding in North America, did not last. Charles I's haste to make peace with France on the terms most beneficial to him meant the new North American gains would be bargained away in the Treaty of Saint-Germain-en-Laye, which established which European power had laid claim over the territories. The French quickly defeated the Scots at Baleine, and established the first European settlements on Île Royale, which is present-day Englishtown (1629) and St. Peter's (1630). These settlements lasted only one generation, until Nicolas Denys left in 1659. The island did not have any European settlers for another fifty years before those communities along with Louisbourg were re-established in 1713, after which point European settlement was permanently established on the island.

=== Île Royale ===
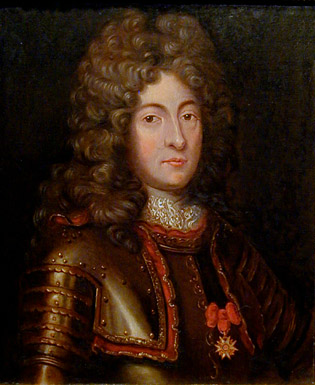
Philippe de Pastour de Costebelle, 1st Governor of Île Royale, only known image of a French Governor

Known as Île Royale ('royal island') to the French, the island also saw active settlement by France. After the French ceded their claims to Newfoundland and the Acadian mainland to the British by the Treaty of Utrecht in 1713, the French relocated the population of Plaisance, Newfoundland, to Île Royale and the French garrison was established in the central eastern part at Sainte Anne. As the harbour at Sainte Anne experienced icing problems, it was decided to build a much larger fortification at Louisbourg to improve defences at the entrance to the Gulf of Saint Lawrence and to defend France's fishing fleet on the Grand Banks. The French also built the Louisbourg Lighthouse in 1734, the first lighthouse in Canada and one of the first in North America. In addition to Cape Breton Island, the French colony of Île Royale also included Île Saint-Jean, today called Prince Edward Island, and Les Îles-de-la-Madeleine.

==== Seven Years' War ====
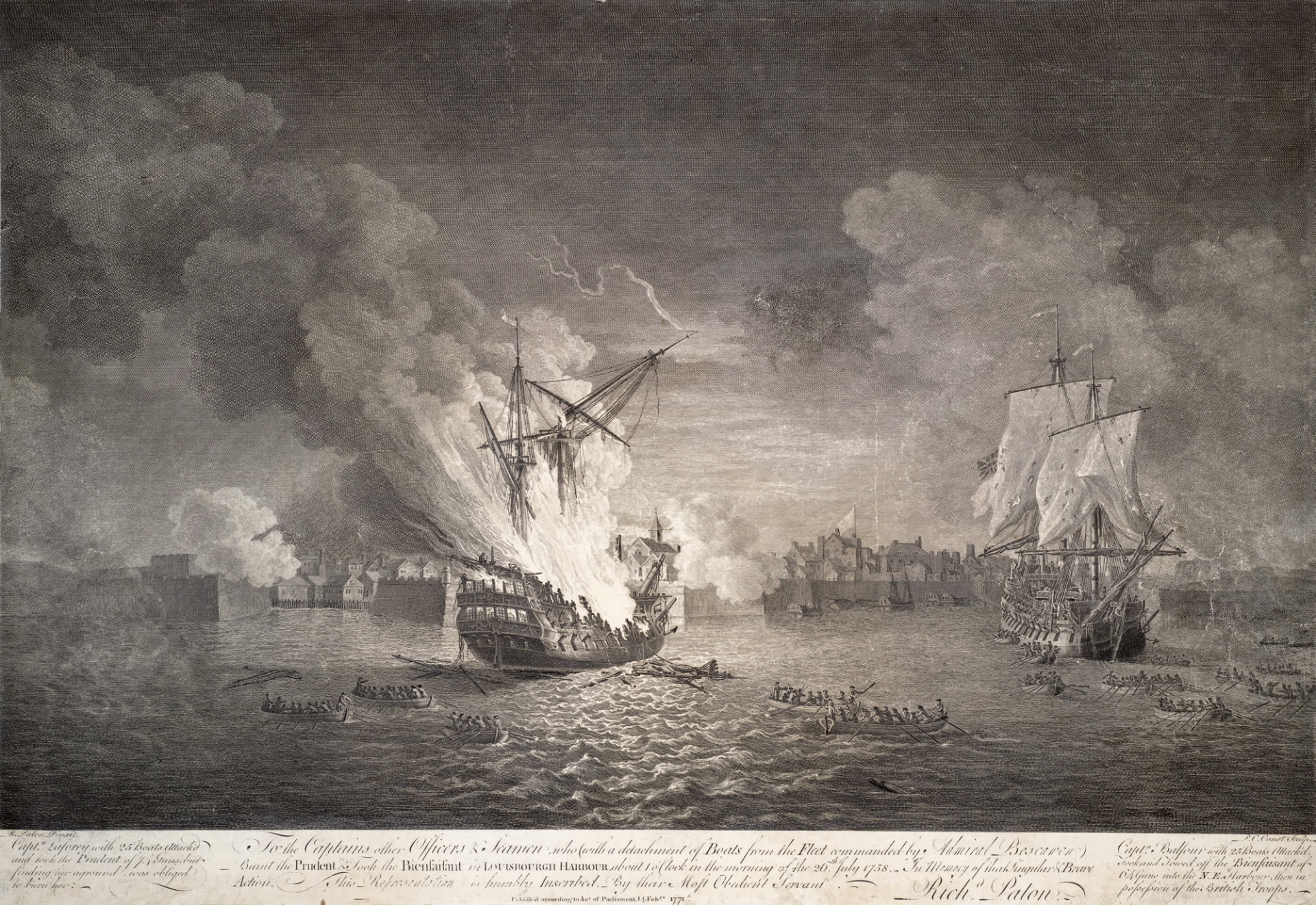
Siege of Louisbourg (1758)

Louisbourg itself was one of the most important commercial and military centres in New France. Louisbourg was captured by New Englanders with British naval assistance in the Siege of Louisbourg (1745) and by British forces in 1758. The French population of Île Royale was deported to France after each siege. While French settlers returned to their homes in Île Royale after the Treaty of Aix-la-Chapelle was signed in 1748, the fortress was demolished after the second siege in 1758. Île Royale remained formally part of New France until it was ceded to Great Britain by the Treaty of Paris in 1763. It was then merged with the adjacent British colony of Nova Scotia (present-day peninsular Nova Scotia and New Brunswick). Acadians who had been expelled from Nova Scotia and Île Royale were permitted to settle in Cape Breton beginning in 1764, and established communities in northwestern Cape Breton, near Chéticamp, and southern Cape Breton, on and near Isle Madame. Some of the first British-sanctioned settlers on the island following the Seven Years' War were Irish, although upon settlement they merged with local French communities to form a culture rich in music and tradition. From 1763 to 1784, the island was administratively part of the colony of Nova Scotia and was governed from Halifax. The first permanently settled Scottish community on Cape Breton Island was Judique, settled in 1775 by Michael Mor MacDonald. He spent his first winter using his upside-down boat for shelter, which is reflected in the architecture of the village's Community Centre. He composed a song about the area called "O 's àlainn an t-àite", or "O, Fair is the Place."

==== American Revolution ====
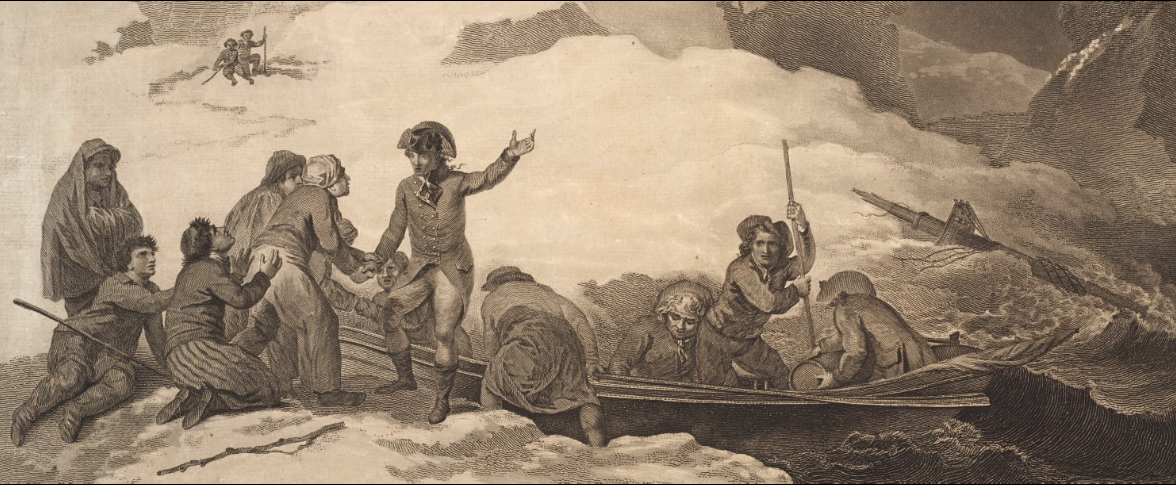
Samuel Waller Prentice, 84th Regiment, 4 January 1780, shipwrecked off Cape Breton, Nova Scotia by Robert Pollard (1784)

During the American Revolution, on 1 November 1776, John Paul Jones, the father of the American Navy, set sail in command of Alfred to free hundreds of American prisoners working in the area's coal mines. Although winter conditions prevented the freeing of the prisoners, the mission did result in the capture of Mellish, a vessel carrying a vital supply of winter clothing intended for John Burgoyne's troops in Canada. Major Timothy Hierlihy and his regiment on board HMS Hope worked in and protected the coal mines at Sydney, Cape Breton, from privateer attacks. Sydney, Cape Breton provided a vital supply of coal for Halifax throughout the war. The British began developing the mining site at Sydney Mines in 1777. On 14 May 1778, Major Hierlihy arrived at Cape Breton. While there, Hierlihy reported that he "beat off many piratical attacks, killed some and took other prisoners." A few years into the war, there was also a naval engagement between French ships and a British convoy off Sydney, Nova Scotia, near Spanish River (1781), Cape Breton. French ships, fighting with the Americans, were re-coaling and defeated a British convoy. Six French and 17 British sailors were killed, with many more wounded.

=== Colony of Cape Breton ===
In 1784, Britain split the colony of Nova Scotia into three separate colonies: New Brunswick, Cape Breton Island, and present-day peninsular Nova Scotia, in addition to the adjacent colonies of St. John's Island (renamed Prince Edward Island in 1798) and Newfoundland. The colony of Cape Breton Island had its capital at Sydney on its namesake harbour fronting on Spanish Bay and the Cabot Strait. Its first Lieutenant-Governor was Joseph Frederick Wallet DesBarres (1784–1787) and his successor was William Macarmick (1787). A number of United Empire Loyalists emigrated to the Canadian colonies, including Cape Breton. David Mathews, the former Mayor of New York City during the American Revolution, emigrated with his family to Cape Breton in 1783. He succeeded Macarmick as head of the colony and served from 1795 to 1798. From 1799 to 1807, the military commandant was John Despard, brother of Edward. An order forbidding the granting of land in Cape Breton, issued in 1763, was removed in 1784. The mineral rights to the island were given over to the Duke of York by an order-in-council. The British government had intended that the Crown take over the operation of the mines when Cape Breton was made a colony, but this was never done, probably because of the rehabilitation cost of the mines. The mines were in a neglected state, caused by careless operations dating back at least to the time of the final fall of Louisbourg in 1758. Large-scale shipbuilding began in the 1790s, beginning with schooners for local trade, moving in the 1820s to larger brigs and brigantines, mostly built for British ship owners. Shipbuilding peaked in the 1850s, marked in 1851 by the full-rigged ship Lord Clarendon, which was the largest wooden ship ever built in Cape Breton.

=== Annexation to Nova Scotia ===
In 1820, the colony of Cape Breton Island was merged for the second time with Nova Scotia. By the late 19th century, as a result of the faster shipping, expanding fishery and industrialization of the island, exchanges of people between the island of Newfoundland and Cape Breton increased, beginning a cultural exchange that continues to this day.

=== 20th century ===
The turn of the 20th century saw Cape Breton Island at the forefront of scientific achievement with the now-famous activities launched by inventors Alexander Graham Bell and Guglielmo Marconi. Following his successful invention of the telephone and being relatively wealthy, Bell acquired land near Baddeck in 1885. He chose the land, which he named Beinn Bhreagh, largely due to its resemblance to his early surroundings in Scotland. He established a summer estate complete with research laboratories, working with deaf people including Helen Keller, and continued to invent. Baddeck would be the site of his experiments with hydrofoil technologies as well as the Aerial Experiment Association, financed by his wife Mabel Gardiner Hubbard. These efforts resulted in the first powered flight in Canada when the AEA Silver Dart took off from the ice-covered waters of Bras d'Or Lake. Bell also built the forerunner to the iron lung and experimented with breeding sheep.

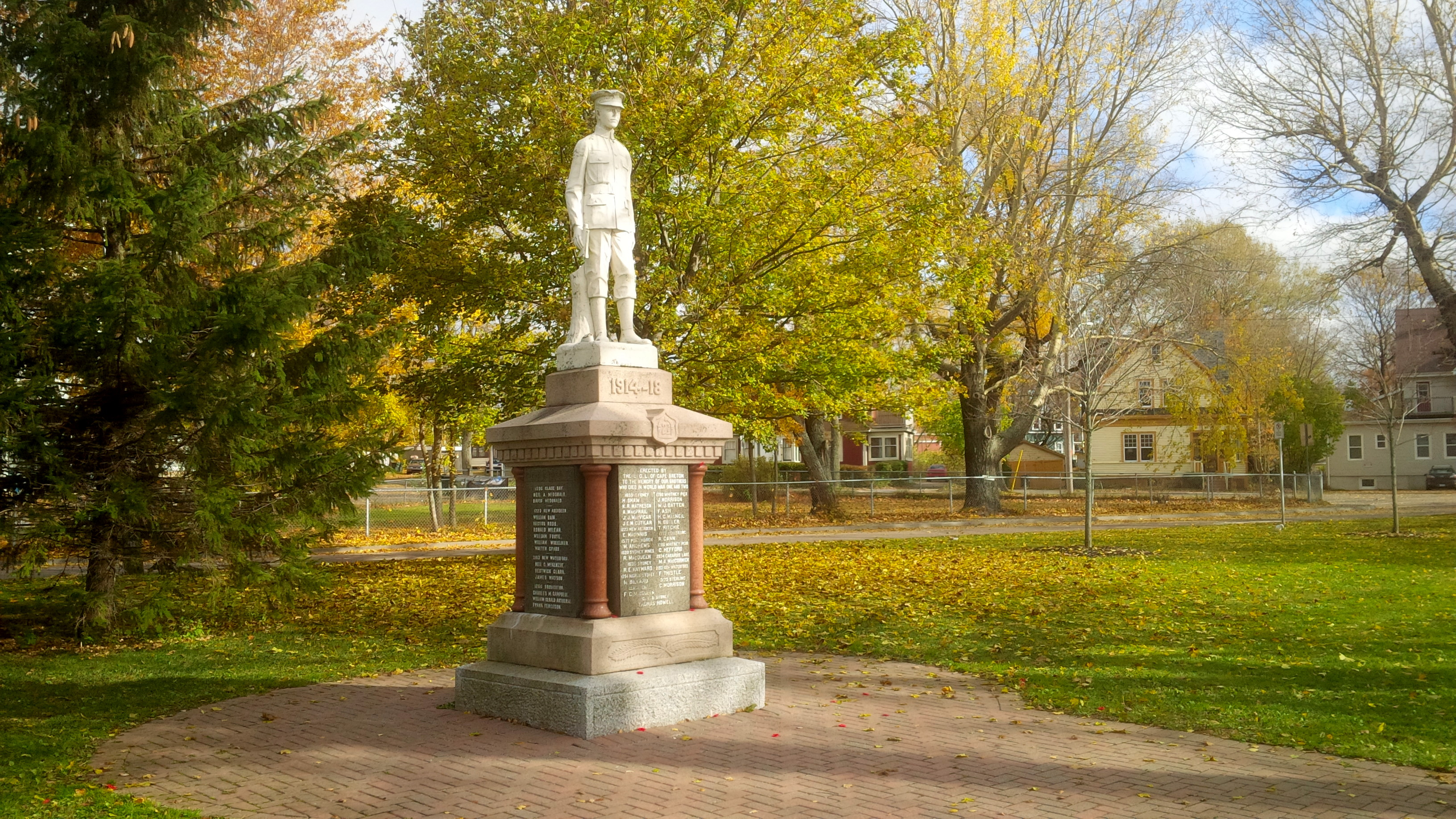
Orangemen War Memorial in Wentworth Park, Sydney

Marconi's contributions to Cape Breton Island were also quite significant, as he used the island's geography to his advantage in transmitting the first North American trans-Atlantic radio message from a station constructed at Table Head in Glace Bay to a receiving station at Poldhu in Cornwall, England. Marconi's pioneering work in Cape Breton marked the beginning of modern radio technology. Marconi's station at Marconi Towers, on the outskirts of Glace Bay, became the chief communication centre for the Royal Canadian Navy in World War I through to the early years of World War II. Promotions for tourism beginning in the 1950s recognized the importance of the Scottish culture to the province, as the provincial government started encouraging the use of Gaelic once again. The establishment of funding for the Gaelic College of Celtic Arts and Crafts and formal Gaelic language courses in public schools are intended to address the near-loss of this culture to assimilation into Anglophone Canadian culture. In the 1960s, the Fortress of Louisbourg was partially reconstructed by Parks Canada, using the labour of unemployed coal miners. Since 2009, this National Historic Site of Canada has attracted an average of 90,000 visitors per year.

== Geography ==
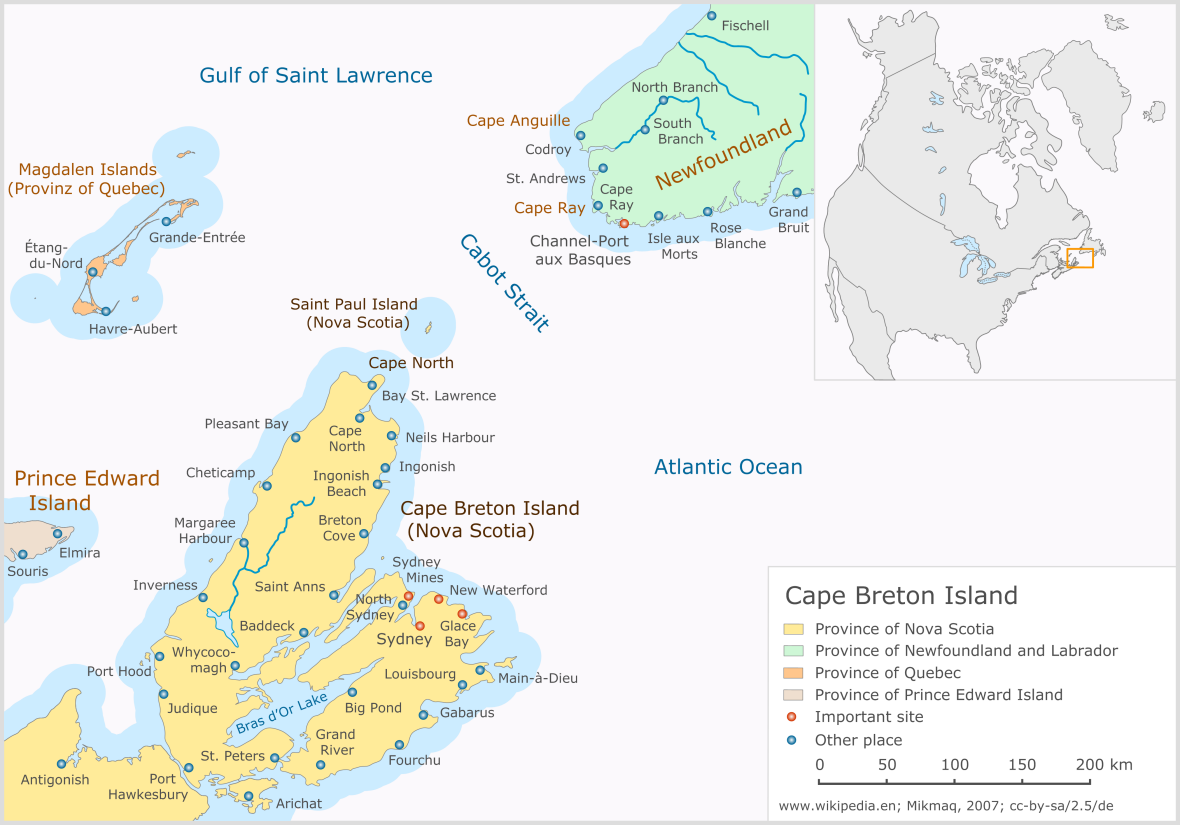
Map of select municipalities on Cape Breton Island

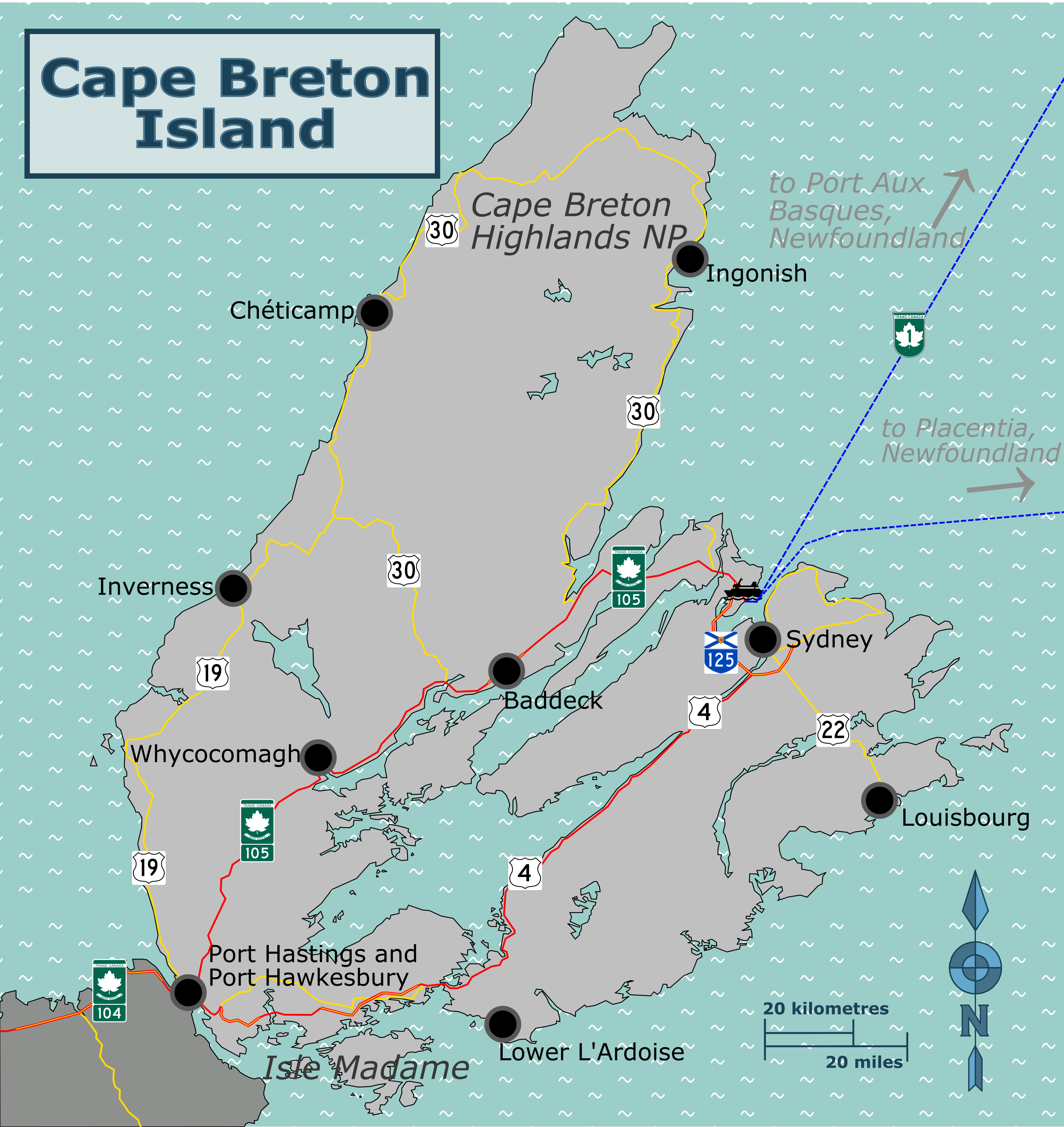
Travel map of Cape Breton Island, with major highways and freeways marked

The irregularly-shaped rectangular island is about 100 km wide and 150 long, for a total of 10,311 square kilometres (3,981 sq mi) in area. It lies in the southeastern extremity of the Gulf of St. Lawrence. Cape Breton is separated from the Nova Scotia peninsula by the very deep Strait of Canso. The island is joined to the mainland by the Canso Causeway. Cape Breton Island is composed of rocky shores, rolling farmland, glacial valleys, barren headlands, highlands, woods and plateaus.

=== Geology ===
The island is characterized by a number of elevations of ancient crystalline and metamorphic rock rising up from the south to the north, and contrasted with eroded lowlands. The bedrock of blocks that developed in different places around the globe, at different times, and then were fused together via tectonics. Cape Breton is formed from three terranes. These are fragments of the Earth's crust formed on a tectonic plate and attached by accretion or suture to crust lying on another plate. Each of these has its own distinctive geologic history, which is different from that of the surrounding areas. The southern half of the island formed from the Avalon terrane, which was once a microcontinent in the Paleozoic era. It is made up of volcanic rock that formed near what is now called Africa. Most of the northern half of the island is on the Bras d'Or terrane (part of the Ganderia terrane). It contains volcanic and sedimentary rock formed off the coast of what is now South America. The third terrane is the relatively small Blair River inlier on the far northwestern tip. It contains the oldest rock in the Maritimes, formed up to 1.6 billion years ago. These rocks, which can be seen in the Polletts Cove-Aspy Fault Wilderness Area north of Pleasant Bay, are likely part of the Canadian Shield, a large area of Precambrian igneous and metamorphic rock that forms the core of the North American continent. The Avalon and Bras d'Or terranes were pushed together about 500 million years ago when the supercontinent Gondwana was formed. The Blair River inlier was sandwiched in between the two when Laurussia was formed 450-360 million years ago, at which time the land was found in the tropics. This collision also formed the Appalachian Mountains. Associated rifting and faulting is now visible as the canyons of the Cape Breton Highlands. Then, during the Carboniferous period, the area was flooded, which created sedimentary rock layers such as sandstone, shale, gypsum, and conglomerate. Later, most of the island was tropical forest which later formed coal deposits. Much later, the land was shaped by repeated ice ages which left striations, till, U-shaped valleys, and carved the Bras d'Or Lake from the bedrock. Examples of U-shaped valleys are those of the Chéticamp, Grande Anse, and Clyburn River valleys. Other valleys have been eroded by water, forming V-shaped valleys and canyons. Cape Breton has many fault lines but few earthquakes. Since the North American continent is moving westward, earthquakes tend to occur on the western edge of the continent.

=== Climate ===
Sydney

Climate chart (precipitation, max. and min. temperature)
J	F	M	A	M	J	J	A	S	O	N	D
153 −1 −10	128 −2 −10	130 2 −7	133 7 −2	103 13 3	97 19 8	89 23 13	100 23 13	119 19 9	143 13 4	156 7 0	167 2 −5
- █ Average max. and min. temperatures in °C
- █ Precipitation totals in mm
- Source: Environment Canada
Imperial conversion
J	F	M	A	M	J	J	A	S	O	N	D
6 30 15	5 29 13	5.1 35 20	5.2 44 29	4.1 56 37	3.8 65 46	3.5 74 55	3.9 73 56	4.7 66 48	5.6 55 40	6.1 45 32	6.6 36 23
- █ Average max. and min. temperatures in °F
- █ Precipitation totals in inches

The warm summer humid continental climate is moderated by the proximity of the cold, oftentimes polar Labrador Current and its warmer counterpart the Gulf Stream, both being dominant currents in the North Atlantic Ocean.

=== Ecology ===
==== Lowlands ====
There are lowland areas in along the western shore, around Lake Ainslie, the Bras d'Or watershed, Boularderie Island, and the Sydney coalfield. They include salt marshes, coastal beaches, and freshwater wetlands. Starting in the 1800s, many areas were cleared for farming or timber. Many farms were abandoned from the 1920s to the 1950s with fields being reclaimed by white spruce, red maple, white birch, and balsam fir. Higher slopes are dominated by yellow birch and sugar maple. In sheltered areas with sun and drainage, Acadian forest is found. Wetter areas have tamarack, and black spruce. The weather station at Ingonish records more rain than anywhere else in Nova Scotia. Behind barrier beaches and dunes at Aspy Bay are salt marshes. The Aspy, Clyburn, and Ingonish rivers have all created floodplains which support populations of black ash, fiddle head fern, swamp loosestrife, swamp milkweed, southern twayblade, and bloodroot. Red sandstone and white gypsum cliffs can be observed throughout this area. Bedrock is Carboniferous sedimentary with limestone, shale, and sandstone. Many fluvial remains from are glaciation found here. Mining has been ongoing for centuries, and more than 500 mine openings can be found, mainly in the east. Karst topography is found in Dingwall, South Harbour, Plaster Provincial Park, along the Margaree and Middle Rivers, and along the north shore of Lake Ainslie. The presence of gypsum and limestone increases soil pH and produces some rich wetlands which support giant spear, tufted fen, and other mosses, as well as vascular plants like sedges.

==== Cape Breton Hills ====
This ecosystem is spread throughout Cape Breton and is defined as hills and slopes 150-300m above sea level, typically covered with Acadian forest. It includes North Mountain, Kellys Mountain, and East Bay Hills. Forests in this area were cleared for timber and agriculture and are now a mosaic of habitats depending on the local terrain, soils and microclimate. Typical species include ironwood, white ash, beech, sugar maple, red maple, and yellow birch. The understory can include striped maple, beaked hazelnut, fly honeysuckle, club mosses and ferns. Ephemerals are visible in the spring, such as Dutchman's breeches and spring beauty. In ravines, shade tolerant trees like hemlock, white pine, red spruce are found. Less well-drained areas are forested with balsam fir and black spruce.

==== Highlands and the Northern Plateau ====
The Highlands comprise a tableland in the northern portions of Inverness and Victoria counties. An extension of the Appalachian mountain chain, elevations average 350 m (1,150 ft) at the edges of the plateau and rise to more than 500 m (1,600 ft) at the centre. The area has broad, gently rolling hills bisected with deep valleys and steep-walled canyons. A majority of the land is a taiga of balsam fir, with some white birch, white spruce, mountain ash, and heart-leaf birch. The northern and western edges of the plateau, particularly at high elevations, resemble arctic tundra. Trees 30–90m high, overgrown with reindeer lichens, can be 150 years old. At very high elevations some areas are exposed bedrock without any vegetation apart from Cladonia lichens. There are many barrens, or heaths, dominated by bushy species of the Ericaceae family. Spruce, killed by spruce budworm in the late 1970s, has reestablished at lower elevations, but not at higher elevations due to moose browsing. Decomposition is slow, leaving thick layers of plant litter. Ground cover includes wood aster, twinflower, liverworts, wood sorrel, bluebead lily, goldthread, various ferns, and lily-of-the-valley, with bryophyte and large-leaved goldenrod at higher elevations. The understory can include striped maple, mountain ash, ferns, and mountain maple. Near water, bog birch, alder, and mountain-ash are found. There are many open wetlands populated with stunted tamarack and black spruce. Poor drainage has led to the formation of peatlands which can support tufted clubrush, Bartram's serviceberry, coastal sedge, and bakeapple.

==== Cape Breton coastal ====
The eastern shore is unique in that while not at a high elevation, it has a cool climate with much rain and fog, strong winds, and low summer temperatures. It is dominated by a boreal forest of black spruce and balsam fir. Sheltered areas support tolerant hardwoods such as white birch and red maple. Many salt marshes, fens, and bogs are found there. There are many beaches on the highly crenelated coastline. Unlike elsewhere on the island, these are rocky and support plants unlike those of sandy beaches. The coast provides habitat for common coast bird species like common eider, black legged kittiwake, black guillemot, whimbrel, and great cormorant.

=== Hydrology ===
Land is drained into the Gulf of Saint Lawrence via the rivers Aspy, Sydney, Mira, Framboise, Margaree, and Chéticamp. The largest freshwater lake is Lake Ainslie.

== Government ==
Local government on the island is provided by the Cape Breton Regional Municipality, the Municipality of the County of Inverness, the Municipality of the County of Richmond, and the Municipality of the County of Victoria, along with the Town of Port Hawkesbury. The island has five Miꞌkmaq Indian reserves: Eskasoni (the largest in population and land area), Membertou, Wagmatcook, Waycobah, and Potlotek.

== Demographics ==
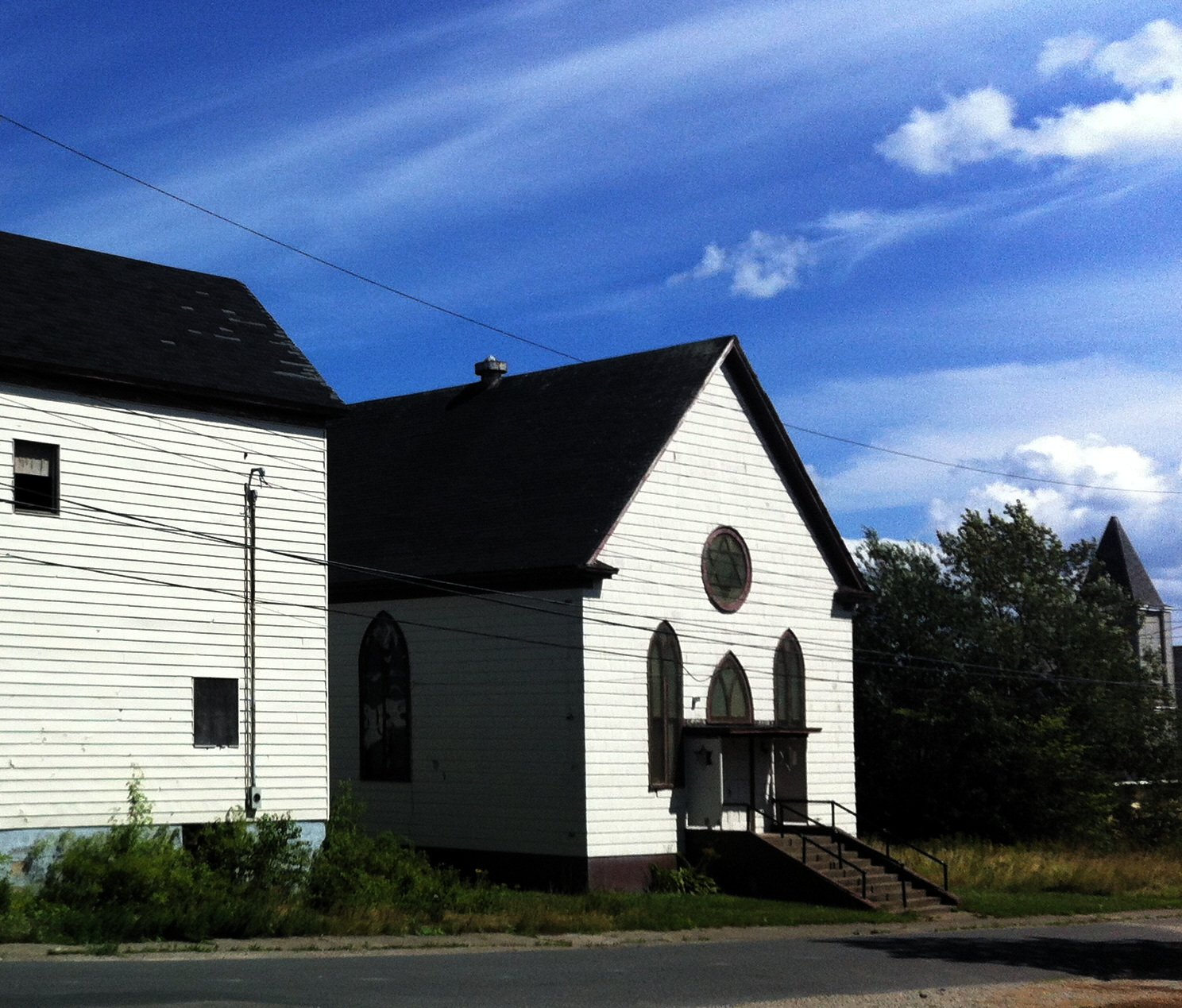
The former Congregation Sons of Israel synagogue, in Glace Bay. In 1902, the synagogue was Nova Scotia's first purpose-built synagogue. It permanently closed in July 2010. To the left is the also closed Talmud Torah community centre. This was the location of the Hebrew school and functions like Bar Mitzvah and wedding dinners.

The island's residents can be grouped into five main cultures: Scottish, Mi'kmaq, Acadian, Irish, and English, with respective languages Scottish Gaelic, Mi'kmaq, French, and English alongside several sign languages including Maritime Sign Language. English is now the primary language, including a locally distinctive Cape Breton accent, while Mi'kmaq, Scottish Gaelic and Acadian French are still spoken in some communities. Amongst sign languages, it is unknown to what extent LSQ is spoken amongst Acadians, but American Sign Language is certainly predominant across the island, as it has gained significant numbers of signers, especially with the steep declines in Maritime Sign Language use. Later migrations of Black Loyalists, Italians, and Eastern Europeans mostly settled in the island's eastern part around the industrial Cape Breton region. Cape Breton Island's population has been in decline two decades with an increasing exodus in recent years due to economic conditions. Population trend

Census	Population	Change (%)
1951	157,696	
1956	162,859	▲3.3%
1961	169,865	▲4.3%
1966	166,943	▼1.7%
1971	170,007	▲1.8%
1976	170,866	▲0.5%
1981	170,628	▼0.1%
1986	166,116	▼2.6%
1991	161,686	▼2.7%
1996	158,271	▼2.1%
2001	147,454	▼6.8%
2006	142,298	▼3.5%
2011	135,974	▼4.4%
2016	132,010	▼2.9%
2021	132,019	▲0.0%

=== Religious groups ===
Statistics Canada in 2001 reported a "religion" total of 145,525 for Cape Breton, including 5,245 with "no religious affiliation." Major categories included:

- Roman Catholic: 96,260 (includes Eastern Catholic, Polish National Catholic Church, Old Catholic)
- Protestant: 42,390
- Christian, not included elsewhere: 580
- Orthodox: 395
- Jewish: 250
- Muslim: 145

== Economy ==
Much of the recent economic history of Cape Breton Island can be tied to the coal industry. The island has two major coal deposits:

- the Sydney Coal Field in the southeastern part of the island along the Atlantic Ocean drove the Industrial Cape Breton economy throughout the 19th and 20th centuries—until after World War II, its industries were the largest private employers in Canada.
- the Inverness Coal Field in the western part of the island along the Gulf of St. Lawrence is significantly smaller but hosted several mines.

Sydney has traditionally been the main port, with facilities in a large, sheltered, natural harbour. It is the island's largest commercial centre and home to the Cape Breton Post daily newspaper, as well as one television station, CJCB-TV (CTV), (Note: CBIT-TV (CBC) existed from 1972 until 31 July 2012, when the CBC closed its over-the-air analog transmitters in small markets. It produced a local news broadcast until 1991, when local news shows were consolidated to Halifax. The CBC Nova Scotia television signal, which originates from Halifax, is now available only by cable or satellite providers.) and several radio stations. The Marine Atlantic terminal at North Sydney is the terminal for large ferries traveling to Channel-Port aux Basques and seasonally to Argentia, both on the island of Newfoundland. Point Edward on the west side of Sydney Harbour is the location of Sydport, a former navy base (HMCS Protector) now converted to commercial use. The Canadian Coast Guard College is nearby at Westmount. Petroleum, bulk coal, and cruise ship facilities are also in Sydney Harbour. Glace Bay, the second largest urban community in population, was the island's main coal mining centre until its last mine closed in the 1980s. Glace Bay was the hub of the Sydney & Louisburg Railway and a major fishing port. At one time, Glace Bay was known as the largest town in Nova Scotia, based on population. Port Hawkesbury has risen to prominence since the completion of the Canso Causeway and Canso Canal created an artificial deep-water port, allowing extensive petrochemical, pulp and paper, and gypsum handling facilities to be established. The Strait of Canso is completely navigable to Seawaymax vessels, and Port Hawkesbury is open to the deepest-draught vessels on the world's oceans. Large marine vessels may also enter Bras d'Or Lake through the Great Bras d'Or channel, and small craft can use the Little Bras d'Or channel or St. Peters Canal. While commercial shipping no longer uses the St. Peters Canal, it remains an important waterway for recreational vessels. The industrial Cape Breton area faced several challenges with the closure of the Cape Breton Development Corporation's (DEVCO) coal mines and the Sydney Steel Corporation's (SYSCO) steel mill. In recent years, the Island's residents have tried to diversify the area economy by investing in tourism developments, call centres, and small businesses, as well as manufacturing ventures in fields such as auto parts, pharmaceuticals, and window glazings.

== Culture ==
Cape Breton Island's most recognizable and commonly used flag

Cape Breton Island's "Eagle" flag (1994)

Cape Breton Island's second cultural flag, the "Tartan" flag (early 1990s)

Cape Breton Island's first cultural flag, the blue-and-yellow flag (1940s) incorporating Saint Alban's Cross.

=== Gaelic language ===
Gaelic speakers in Cape Breton, as elsewhere in Nova Scotia, constituted a large proportion of the local population from the 18th century on. They brought with them a common culture of poetry, traditional songs and tales, music and dance, and used this to develop distinctive local traditions. Most Gaelic settlement in Nova Scotia happened between 1770 and 1840, with probably over 50,000 Gaelic speakers emigrating from the Scottish Highlands and the Hebrides to Nova Scotia and Prince Edward Island. Such emigration was facilitated or forced by changes in Gaelic society and the economy, with sharp increases in rents, confiscation of land, disruption of local customs and rights and the eviction of large parts of the population from their rented land, a process that is called Highland Clearances. In Nova Scotia, poetry and song in Gaelic flourished. George Emmerson argues that an "ancient and rich" tradition of storytelling, song, and Gaelic poetry emerged during the 18th century and was transplanted from the Highlands of Scotland to Nova Scotia, where the language similarly took root there. The majority of those settling in Nova Scotia from the end of the 18th century through to middle of the next were from the Scottish Highlands, rather than the Lowlands, making the Highland tradition's impact more profound on the region. Gaelic settlement in Cape Breton began in earnest in the early nineteenth century.

The Gaelic language became dominant from Colchester County in the west of Nova Scotia into Cape Breton County in the east. It was reinforced in Cape Breton in the first half of the 19th century with an influx of Highland Scots numbering approximately 50,000 as a result of the Highland Clearances. From 1892 to 1904, Jonathon MacKinnon published the Scottish Gaelic-language biweekly newspaper Mac-Talla (lit. 'The Echo') in Sydney, Nova Scotia. During the 1920s, several Scottish Gaelic-language newspapers were printed in Sydney for distribution primarily on Cape Breton, including the Teachdaire nan Gàidheal (lit. 'The Messenger of the Gaels'), which included Gaelic-language lessons; the United Church-affiliated An Solus Iùil (lit. 'The Guiding Light'); and MacKinnon's later endeavor, Fear na Cèilidh (lit. 'The Entertainer'). Gaelic speakers, however, tended to be poor; they were largely illiterate and had little access to education. This situation persisted into the early days of the twentieth century. In 1921 Gaelic was approved as an optional subject in the curriculum of Nova Scotia, but few teachers could be found and children were discouraged from using the language in schools. By 1931 the number of Gaelic speakers in Nova Scotia had fallen to approximately 25,000, mostly in discrete pockets. In Cape Breton it was still a majority language, but the proportion was falling. Children were no longer being raised with Gaelic. From 1939 on, attempts were made to strengthen its position in the public school system in Nova Scotia, but funding, official commitment and the availability of teachers continued to be a problem. By the 1950s the number of speakers was less than 7,000. The advent of multiculturalism in Canada in the 1960s meant that new educational opportunities became available, with a gradual strengthening of the language at secondary and tertiary level. At present several schools in Cape Breton offer Gaelic Studies and Gaelic language programs, and the language is taught at Cape Breton University. The 2016 Canadian Census shows that there are only 40 reported speakers of Gaelic as a mother tongue in Cape Breton. On the other hand, there are families and individuals who have recommenced intergenerational transmission. They include fluent speakers from Gaelic-speaking areas of Scotland and speakers who became fluent in Nova Scotia and who in some cases studied in Scotland. Other revitalization activities include adult education, community cultural events and publishing.

=== Traditional music ===
Cape Breton is well known for its traditional fiddle music, which was brought to North America by Scottish immigrants during the Highland Clearances. The traditional style has been well preserved in Cape Breton, and cèilidhs have become a popular attraction for tourists. Inverness County in particular has a heavy concentration of musical activity, with regular performances in communities such as Mabou and Judique. Judique is recognized as "Baile nam Fonn" (lit. 'Village of Tunes') or the 'Home of Celtic Music', featuring the Celtic Music Interpretive Centre. The traditional fiddle music of Cape Breton is studied by musicians around the world, where its global recognition continues to rise. "The Island" by Kenzie MacNeil, and "Rise Again", written by Leon Dubinsky and recorded by The Rankin Family, are each considered unofficial anthems of Cape Breton.

== See also ==
- Canadian Gaelic
- Cape Breton accent
- Cape Breton Highlands National Park
- Cape Breton Labour Party
- Cape Breton Regional Municipality
- List of people from Cape Breton
- Province of Cape Breton Island
- Provinces and territories of Canada
- Sydney Tar Ponds
