= Gut =

Gut, GUT or guts may refer to:

== Anatomy ==
- Abdomen or belly, the region of a vertebrate between the chest and pelvis
- Abdominal obesity or "a gut", a large deposit of belly fat
- Gastrointestinal tract or gut, the system of digestive organs
- Insect digestive system
- Lower gastrointestinal tract or guts, the intestines
- To "gut" an animal is part of the butchery process

== Geography and places ==
- Gut (coastal geography), a narrow coastal body of water
- Gut (Crișul Alb), a river in Romania
- Gut River, Jamaica
- Spring Run (West Branch Susquehanna River), also known as The Gut
- River Team, United Kingdom, locally known as 'The Gut'
- The Gut (geological feature), a conservation area east of Apsley, Ontario, Canada
- RAF Gütersloh, a Royal Air Force Germany military airfield

== People ==
- Gut (surname), list of people named Gut or Guts

== Arts, entertainment, and media ==
=== Film and television ===
- Guts (2009 film), a Spanish crime drama
- Guts (1999 film), a Dutch comedy
- Guts (Finnish TV series), a psychological thriller television series
- "Guts" (The Walking Dead), a season 1 episode of the television series The Walking Dead
- Nickelodeon GUTS, a weekly half-hour sports game show which aired on Nickelodeon from 1992 to 1995

=== Games ===
- Guts (card game), a poker variant
- Guts (flying disc game), a team flying disc game
- The Guts!, a series of eroge video games

=== Literature ===
- Guts (Berserk), the protagonist of Kentaro Miura's manga series
- Gut (journal), of the British Society of Gastroenterology
- Guts (Robert A. Lutz book), a 2003 management guidebook by Robert A. Lutz, former CEO of Chrysler
- The Guts (novel), a 2013 novel by Roddy Doyle set in Ireland
- Guts (graphic novel), a 2019 graphic novel by Raina Telgemeier
- "Guts", a short story by Chuck Palahniuk from his 2005 book Haunted
- Guts, a 1985 suspense novel by Richard Laymon
- Gut, a 2014 non-fiction book about the importance of the human gastrointestinal tract by Giulia Enders

=== Music ===
- Guts (album), 2023 album by Olivia Rodrigo
- Gut (album), 2025 album by Baths
- Gut (band), a German goregrind band
- Gut Records, an independent UK record label
- Guts (John Cale album), 1977
- Guts (McPhee, Brötzmann, Kessler, and Zerang album), 2007
- "Guts", a song by All Time Low from Dirty Work
- "Guts!", a song by Arashi
- The Guts, American band in which Geoff Useless performed vocals
- Guts (musician), French hip-hop and funk producer, member of the group Alliance Ethnik as "Gutsy"

== Schools ==
- Gdańsk University of Technology, Poland
- Georgetown University Transportation Shuttle, US
- Graz University of Technology, Austria
- Groningen University Theatre Society
- Gujarat University of Transplantation Sciences, India
- Guilin University of Technology, China

== Other uses ==
- Gut (ritual), Korean shamanistic rites
- Catgut, a type of cord used for instrumental strings
- Grand Unified Theory, a particle physics model
- A "gut feeling" may refer to intuition or a visceral emotional reaction
- Gut spread, an options trading strategy in finance
- Maléku language (ISO 639-3 code: gut), spoken in Costa Rica

== See also ==
- The Guts (disambiguation)
