= The Guts =

The Guts may refer to:

- The Guts (novel), 2013 novel by Roddy Doyle
- The Guts, American band in which Geoff Useless performed vocals
- The Guts!, a series of eroge video games

== See also ==
- Gut (disambiguation)
- Gut (surname), people so named
- Lower gastrointestinal tract or "the guts"
