= Gutting =

Gutting may refer to:

- Disembowelment, the removal of the internal organs
- Ernst Gutting (1919–2013), German Roman Catholic bishop
- Gary Gutting (1942–2019), American philosopher
- Olav Gutting (born 1970), German lawyer and politician

== See also ==
- Guting (disambiguation)
- Gut (surname)
- Gut (disambiguation)
