= Mira River Provincial Park =

Provincial park in Nova Scotia, Canada

- Interactive map of Mira River Provincial Park
- Type: Provincial Park
- Location: Cape Breton Island, Nova Scotia, Canada
- Nearest town: Albert Bridge
- Coordinates: 46°1′46″N 60°2′39″W
- Area: 87.49 hectares (216.2 acres)
- Created: 1967
- Operator: Parks and Recreation Division, Nova Scotia Department of Natural Resources
- Open: May 27 to October 17, 2022
- Status: Designated; Operational
- Website: Mira River Provincial Park

Mira River Provincial Park is a provincial park situated on the Mira River in Cape Breton County, Nova Scotia, 22 kilometres (14 mi) from Sydney and 17 kilometres (11 mi) from the Fortress of Louisbourg National Historic Site of Canada. Opened in 1967, the 87.49 hectares (216.2 acres) property offers camping sites and a range of opportunities for outdoor recreation, including picnicking, swimming, canoeing, kayaking, biking, front-country hiking, boating, fishing, cross-country skiing, snowshoeing, and geocaching.

Lands were initially acquired for the park in 1962, with major acquisitions occurring in 1968 and 1973. The property was designated under the Provincial Parks Act by Order in Council (OIC 84-679) on 12 June 1984. In an area of almost exclusively private properties, the park provides one of the few public access points to the Mira River.

== Geology ==
The Mira River Valley is a dominant topographical feature of southeastern Cape Breton Island, extending from Framboise Cove northwards to about Marion Bridge and then sweeping eastwards to exit at Mira Bay. The river lies between 320 million year old Carboniferous formations to the north and 500 million year old Cambrian and Precambrian formations to the south. The highly eroded bedrock is covered by a thick layer of glacial till, sands and gravels deposited during the retreat of the last ice age some 15,000 years ago.

Lying in a long narrow valley, possibly along an old fault line, the lower reaches of the river have been dammed by glacial gravels to form a long lake. Along the lower two-thirds of the river, these glacial deposits also formed numerous peninsulas such as the one Mira River Provincial Park occupies. About three kilometres from the mouth of the Mira, the river narrows and cuts a valley through bedrock to reach the Atlantic Ocean. Here the valley is less than 50 metres (160 ft) wide, with banks 20 metres (65 feet) high.

The carboniferous bedrock to the north of the Mira includes numerous coal seams - evidence of the area's environment 300 million years ago. At that time shallow lakes, bays, swamps and coastal flood plains covered much of the region. Abundant fossils can be found in this coal. These coal seams supported the region's long history of coal mining. South of the Mira, fossils are also imbedded in the Cambrian sandstones and shales.

== Marine environment ==
The Mira River has a drainage area of approximately 648 square kilometres (250 mi^{2}), with the Gaspereau, Salmon and Trout rivers, along with Black Brook, as its main tributaries. Along the southern part of its course, glacial deposits have interrupted the flow to form a chain of small lakes which are all less than 15 metres above sea level. Tidal waters move back and forth in the eastern portion of the river, although the influx of salt water any distance beyond the river mouth is limited.

The waters of the Mira River support a variety of fish species including sea trout, shad, perch, American eels, striped bass, mackerel, herring, brook trout, speckled trout, minnows and smelts. Consequently, the river is popular for fishing.

== Flora ==
The forest cover of Mira River Provincial Park consists generally of tolerant hardwoods, predominantly sugar maple, on the westernmost portion near Joes Point, with a larger portion of mixed woods through the central portion and softwood stands along the western shoreline, around the maintenance yard and immediately south of the northernmost walk-in campsites. Large areas of non-forested areas are associated with the campground. A six hectare wetland is located along the northernmost shoreline. Portions of the park remain relatively undisturbed and in a region with a long history of human development provide an opportunity to explore and appreciate the area's natural heritage.

== Fauna ==
Due to its small size, long history of human development and use and island-like setting, Mira River Provincial Park is home to a limited number of mammals, including snowshoe hare, red squirrels, voles, moles, bats, field mice and porcupine. Common birds which inhabit the park and surrounding woods and waters include bald eagles, loon, blue heron, Canada goose and a variety of owls, ducks and other waterfowl. Although having limited wildlife values, the park does provide some relatively natural habitat in an area of increasing human development and use.

== Cultural heritage ==
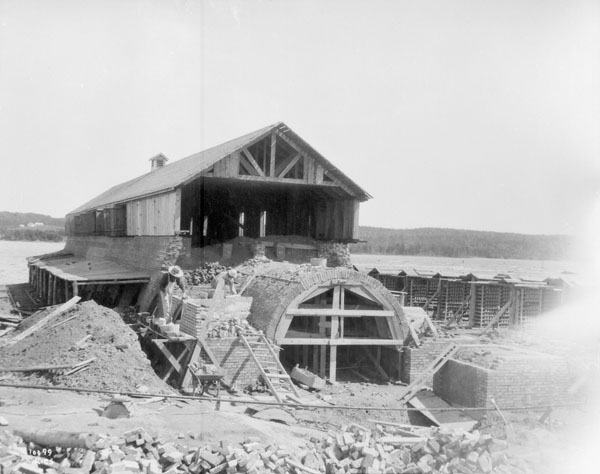
Mira River Brick Works - Kiln buildings, NS - 1910

The first inhabitants of the area were the Mi’kmaq who established seasonal camps along the river. In the early 1700s, French settlers arrived and soon began clearing the land and exporting timber, particularly white pine prized for ship masts, to France. The settlers also farmed as evidenced by the old orchards still found within the park.

In 1727 the French established a brick yard here at what is now known as Brickyard Point in Mira River Provincial Park, to access the high quality of clay found along the river banks. The bricks were used to build the nearby Fortress of Louisbourg which had begun in 1719. Even today, a walk along the shore of the river will reveal hundreds of bricks that fell off the ships transporting them from the kiln to the Louisbourg construction site.

By 1763 the English gained control of Cape Breton Island. While some French settlers returned to France, many others remained. Later, large numbers of United Empire Loyalists and Scottish immigrants settled in Cape Breton.

The park provides an authentic setting to present the story of aboriginal use of the Mira River. As well, there are visible remnants of early French, and later English, occupation of what is now Mira River Provincial Park.

A cemetery owned by a third party is located within the park.

== Outdoor recreation ==
Mira River Provincial Park offers a range of opportunities for outdoor recreation activities. Situated on the 55 kilometre-long Mira River, and within a short drive from the greater Sydney area, the provincial park is popular for pleasure boating and other recreational activities including fishing and swimming. The park offers one of only a limited number of freshwater swimming opportunities in proximity to the Sydney area.

The park offers public access to Mira River and provides facilities and services to better enjoy the area's recreational amenities. These facilities and services include a campground, picnic area, unsupervised swimming area, boat launch, picnic area, walking trails, a playground, parking and washrooms.

A clearly defined trail in wooded areas, open fields, and along the shore can also be used in the winter months for cross-country skiing.

== Tourism ==
Mira River Provincial Park plays an important role in regional tourism efforts. The park provides an accommodation base for campers that is close to the greater Sydney area and the nearby Fortress of Louisbourg National Historic Site of Canada. It also offers one of the best freshwater swimming opportunities in eastern Cape Breton County and access to the Mira River for boating.

== Facilities and services ==
The park has 156 campsites, 51 open (44 water and electric sites), 40 Partially Wooded (15 water and electric), 65 Wooded. The park has a picnic area, a boat launch, and a trailer dump station. The large unsupervised beach is ideal for families to play.

WiFi is available at the admin building and surrounding area. Password required, please see the park receptionist.

== Season and fees ==
The park is open for day use and for camping from May 27 to October 17, 2022. The park Administration building will be staffed from 9:00AM to 11:00PM every day during the park season up to Sept. 5 when the park changes to a Self-registration park to closing. Camping reservations can be made beginning 2 April 2018.

The fee per night is $26.70 (Two-way hook ups are available at some sites for $35.60) Seniors and Veterans discounts are offered.

Please note that there are no facilities in the winter and parking is at the gate only.

The park's civic address is 439 Brickyard Road, Albert Bridge, NS.
