= Albert Bridge, Nova Scotia =

Community in Nova Scotia, Canada

Coordinates: 46°1′10.8″N 60°3′30.3″W

Albert Bridge in Nova Scotia

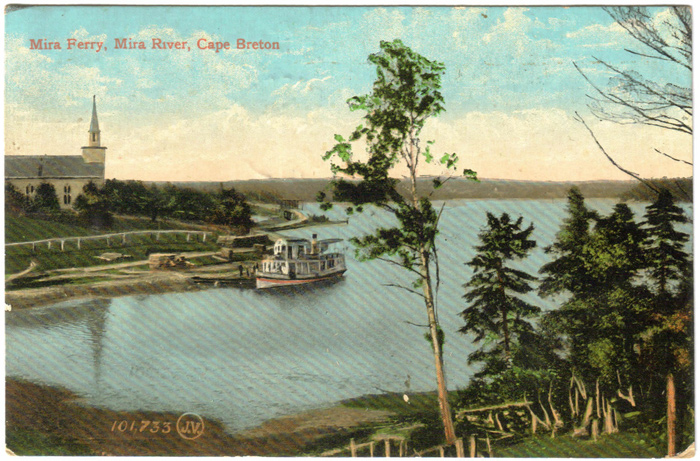
Mira Ferry and Union Church c.1905

Albert Bridge (2001 pop.: 159) is a rural community in the Canadian province of Nova Scotia, located in Cape Breton Regional Municipality. Situated on both sides of the Mira River, the community was previously named Mira Ferry for the location of a small ferry crossing the river. It received its present name either in honour of Prince Albert, Prince Consort, or after Albert Munro, the son of William Henry Munro, Nova Scotia's representative in the British Parliament who used his influence to have the ferry replaced with a bridge in 1849.

== Activities and nearby attractions ==
The community's economy is tied to seasonal residents of cottages in the area and recreational activities on the Mira River during the summer months, including swimming, boating, and canoeing. The northwestern portion of Albert Bridge—the eponymous bridge built in the 1970s to replace an older structure that crossed the Mira River—is a popular platform for bridge diving and jumping into the water below; though, this activity is officially discouraged.

Mira River Provincial Park is near Albert Bridge, off Trunk 22. Union Church, in Mira Ferry, was built in 1857, making it the oldest Presbyterian Church in Cape Breton.

== Notable residents ==
- Allister MacGillivray, songwriter
- Ciaran MacGillivray, musician, Allister's son

== See also ==
- Royal eponyms in Canada
