= Guting =

Guting may refer to:

- Guting District
- Guting metro station

== See also ==
- Gutting (disambiguation)
