= Gut (coastal geography) =

Type of coastal body of water

A gut is a narrow coastal body of water, a channel or strait, usually one that is subject to strong tidal currents flowing back and forth.

== Coastal channels ==
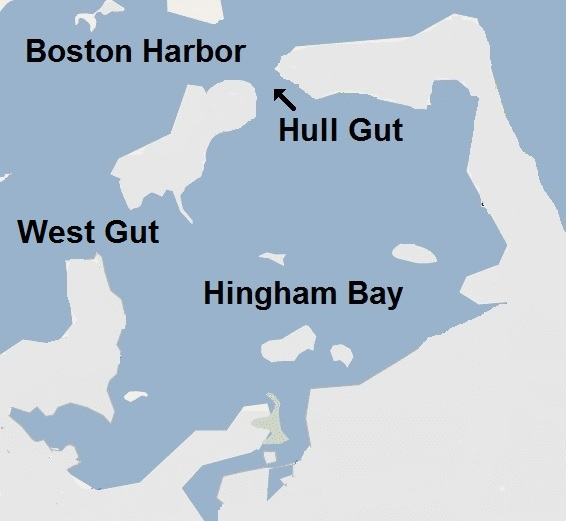
Hull Gut shows the classic conditions for a gut: a large body of water, subject to tides, drained through a small channel, resulting in heavy flow and strong currents

Many guts are straits but some are at river mouths where tidal currents are strong. The comparatively large quantities of water that flow quite quickly through a gut can cause heavy erosion that results in a channel deeper than the rest of the surrounding seabed, and the currents may present a hazard to ships and boats at times.

The term "gut" is primarily (though not exclusively) applied to channels of the coastal waters of the Atlantic coast of North America. A similar term of related but not identical meaning, "gat", is applied to some narrow waterways of the North Sea and Baltic Sea coasts of Europe.

The origin of the word may come from Scottish Gaelic, meaning a rocky, narrow sea inlet or channel.

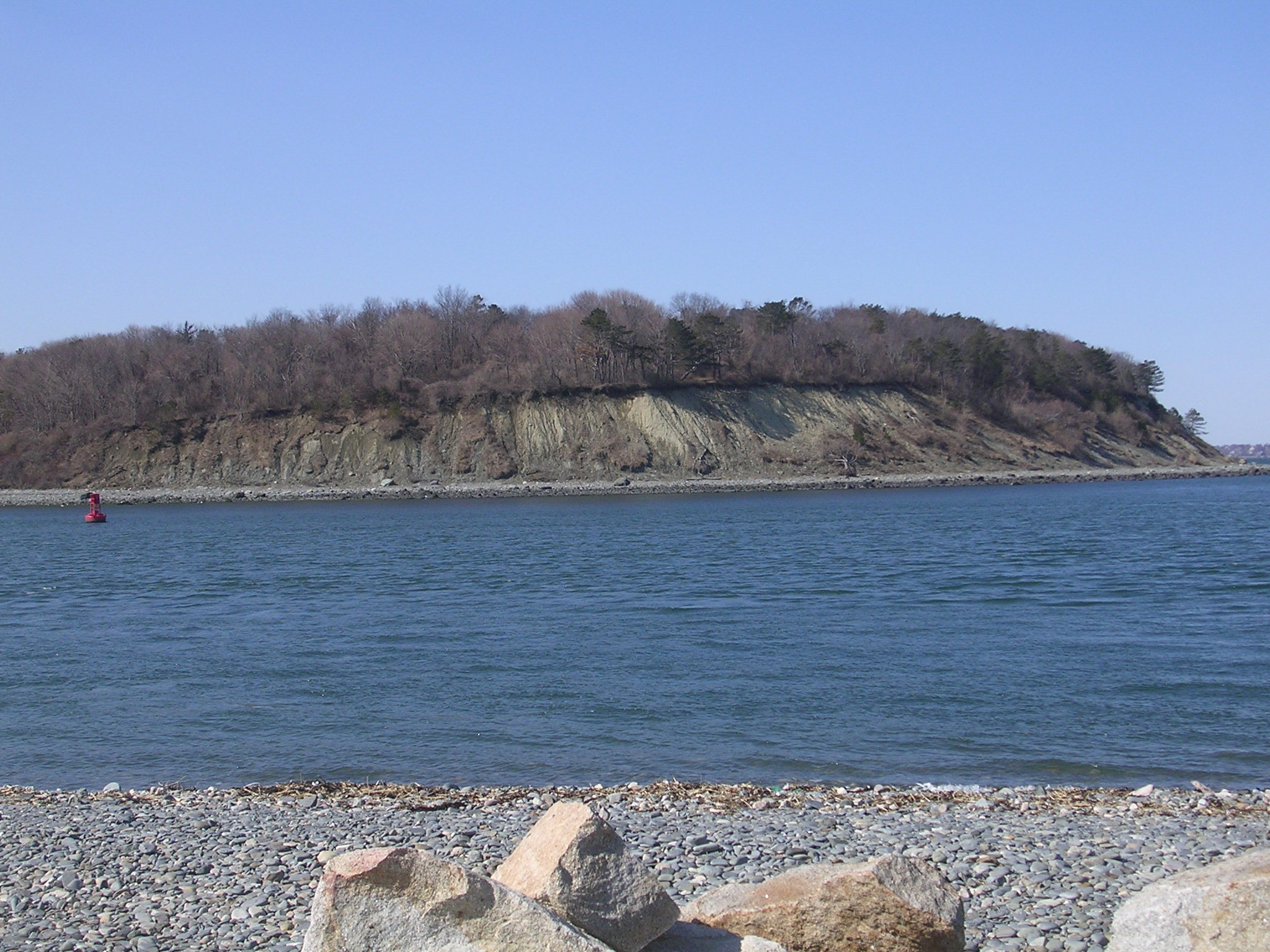
View across Hull Gut in Massachusetts of Peddocks Island from the mainland

Some bodies of water named "Gut" are:

- Digby Gut in Nova Scotia
- Mira Gut, at the confluence of the Mira River with the Atlantic Ocean at the settlement of Mira Gut, Nova Scotia
- Gut of Canso in Nova Scotia
- Big Gut at Pictou Landing, Nova Scotia
- Marie Joseph Gut, Nova Scotia
- Catalone Gut, Nova Scotia
- Framboise Gut, Nova Scotia
- St. Ann's Gut, Nova Scotia
- Shippagan Gut, separating Lamèque Island from the mainland in New Brunswick
- The Gut, separating Rutherford Island from the mainland at South Bristol, Maine
- Townsend Gut, separating Southport Island from the mainland at Southport, Maine
- The Gut at Biddeford Pool in Maine
- The Gut between Cape Neddick in York, Maine and Nubble Light
- Jaquish Gut between Bailey Island and Jaquish Island in Maine
- Spruce Island Gut between the Great Spruce Island and Little Spruce Island in Maine
- Malaga Gut between the Isle of Shoals in Maine
- Hull Gut in Massachusetts
- The Gut in the Little River in Newbury, Massachusetts
- Shirley Gut in Massachusetts (now filled)
- Sally's Gut, in Lake Winnipesaukee between Stonedam Island and the mainland
- Plum Gut (site of the Plum Gut Lighthouse), separating Plum Island from Long Island in New York
- Turtle Gut, site of the Battle of Turtle Gut Inlet in New Jersey (now filled)
- The Wooly Gut, separating West Point Island from West Falkland in the Falkland Islands
- The Gut of Gibraltar, an alternate and mostly archaic name for the Strait of Gibraltar

Many other channels in Canada are named "Gut". Applied to proper names, "gut" is sometimes used more broadly. For instance South Gut and North Gut at the settlement of South Gut St. Anns, Nova Scotia are just inlets, while Brewery Gut in England and The Gut in Ontario are fast-flowing stretches of river, Jigsaw Rock Gut in Antarctica is a gully, and Gardner's Gut in New Zealand is a cave system. Conversely, some guts are not so named, such as The Rip, a gut in Australia, where the term "gut" is not used.

== Creeks ==
"Gut" is sometimes used in an entirely different way, to denote a small creek. This use is found on the east coast of North America, from the Mid-Atlantic States down into the Caribbean islands.

== See also ==
- Tidal race
