= Mira River (Nova Scotia) =

Mira
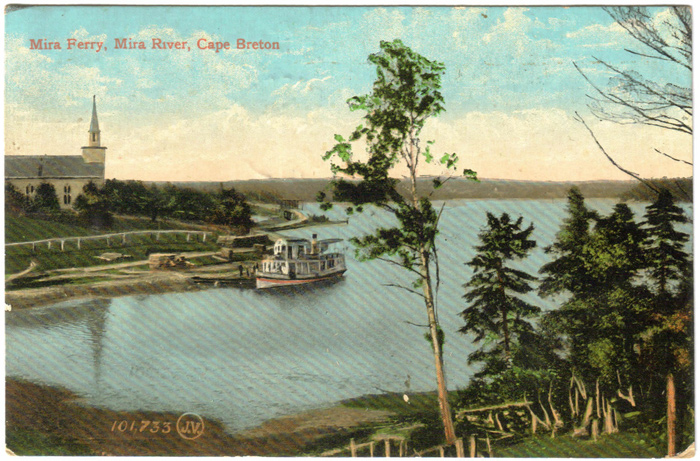
- The Mira Ferry once served on the Mira River.

- Mira River in Nova Scotia Mira River (Nova Scotia) (Canada)
- Etymology: named after French Officer, Lieutenant M. Mire in 1746
- Native name: Sookakade (Mi'kmaq)

Location
- Country: Canada
- Province: Nova Scotia

Physical characteristics
- Mouth
  - location: Mira Gut
  - coordinates: 46°2′10″N 59°58′8″W
  - elevation: sea level
- Length: 54 km (34 mi)
- Basin size: 2,914 km^{2} (1,125 sq mi) (together with Salmon River)

Basin features
- Progression: Mira Gut—Mira Bay
- Bridges: Victoria Bridge, Marion Bridge, Albert Bridge, Mira Gut Bridge (demolished)

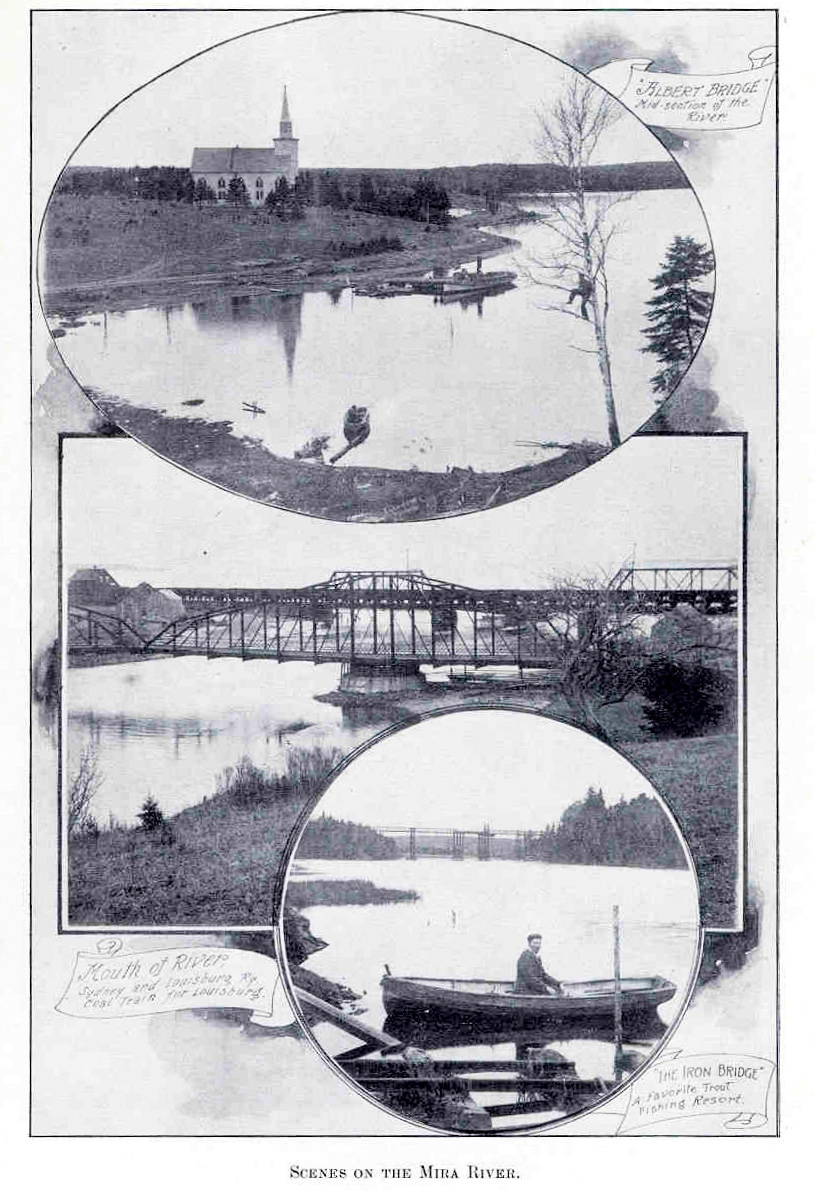
Scenes on the Mira River - 1903

The Mira River (/ˈmaɪˌrə/ MY-rə) is a Canadian river located in eastern Cape Breton Island, Nova Scotia.

With a meander length of approximately 55 km (34 mi), the Mira has a very slow flow rate. The river's source is traced to a series of lakes clustered around Victoria Bridge near the boundary with Richmond County. It is also fed by the Salmon River. Flowing past the communities of Marion Bridge and Albert Bridge, the river discharges through the "Mira Gut" at the community of the same name into the Mira Bay. The river occupies a trench arching from southwest to northeast across the southern part of Cape Breton County; much of the eastern part of the river is a tidal estuary, with noticeable tides extending beyond Albert Bridge approximately 10 km (6.2 mi) upstream of the Gut.

== Name ==
The Mi'kmaq name for the river was 'Sookakade,' meaning 'the silver-place.' One version of source of the river's name is that it was named after a French officer, Lieutenant M. de Mire, in the year 1746. Another source gives the name's origin as having been given by Portuguese fishermen and explorers who may have named it after a place south of Oporto in Portugal. By 1776 the name on maps was 'Miray' and 'Mire.'

== Geology ==
The Mira River Valley is a dominant topographical feature of southeastern Cape Breton, extending from Framboise Cove northwards to about Marion Bridge and then sweeping eastwards to exit at Mira Bay. The river lies between 320 million year old Carboniferous formations to the north and 500 million year old Cambrian and Precambrian formations to the south. The highly eroded bedrock is covered by a thick layer of glacial till, sands and gravels deposited during the retreat of the last ice age some 15,000 years ago.

Lying in a long narrow valley, possibly along an old fault line, the lower reaches of the river have been dammed by glacial gravels to form a long lake. Along the lower two-thirds of the river, these glacial deposits also formed numerous peninsulas such as the one Mira River Provincial Park occupies. About three kilometres from the mouth of the Mira, the river narrows and cuts a valley through bedrock to reach the Atlantic Ocean.

The carboniferous bedrock to the north of the Mira includes numerous coal seams - evidence of the area's environment 300 million years ago. At that time shallow lakes, bays, swamps and coastal flood plains covered much of the region. Abundant fossils can be found in this coal. These coal seams supported the region's long history of coal mining. South of the Mira, fossils are also imbedded in the Cambrian sandstones and shales.

== Marine environment ==
The Mira River has a drainage area of approximately 648 square kilometres (250 mi^{2}), with the Gaspereau, Salmon and Trout rivers, along with Black Brook, as its main tributaries. Along the southern part of its course, glacial deposits have interrupted the flow to form a chain of small lakes which are all less than 15 metres above sea level. Tidal waters move back and forth in the eastern portion of the river.

The waters of the Mira River support a variety of fish species including sea trout, shad, perch, American eel, striped bass, mackerel, herring, brook trout, speckled trout, minnows and smelt. Consequently, the river is popular for fishing.

== Cultural environment ==
The river's width (on some old maps and in old Sailing Directions it is referred to as a lake) and calm waters make it ideal for pleasure boating and other recreational activities; numerous cottages line its banks. Several campgrounds and parks, along with the Mira Boat Club at Albert Bridge make the Mira River a vacation destination in the Cape Breton Regional Municipality. Popular swimming spots include Marion Bridge, Mira Gut Beach, Sangaree Island, Mira Water Park, and Albert Bridge.

The Mira region is also home to the Two Rivers Wildlife Park. According to estimates by the Province of Nova Scotia, there are 102,428 people resident within the Mira/Salmon River watershed in 2011.

== In popular culture ==
The Mira River was the inspiration for local singer-songwriter Allister MacGillivray's "Song for the Mira". Over the years, it has become a renowned folk song, that has been recorded by many artists and translated into several different languages.

== Bridges ==
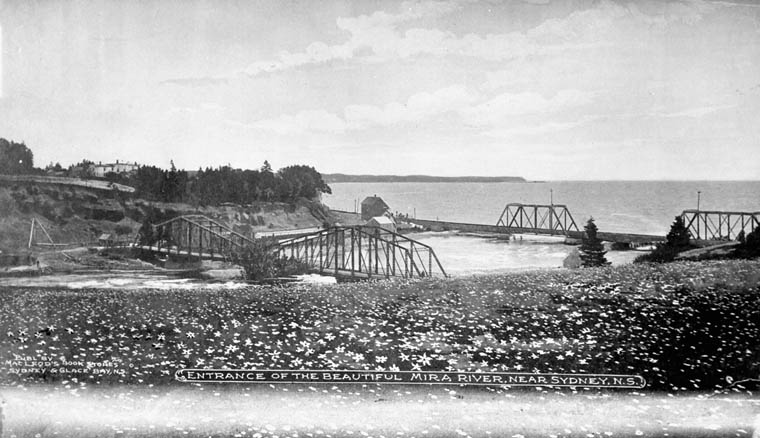
ca 1900-1925 A view of the Mira Gut Road Bridge (nearer) and Sydney and Louisburg Railway's Mira River Bridge (further) at the mouth of the Mira River where it empties into Mira Gut and Mira Bay. Both bridges had swing spans to allow vessels to travel up the Mira River. The nearer bridge was eventually demolished and the further bridge in the photo was converted to carry the road once the railway shut down. "Publ. By MacLeod's Book Stores Sydney & Glace Bay, N.S. Entrance Of The Beautiful Mira River, Near Sydney, N.S."

The Mira River is presently crossed by three road bridges, Victoria Bridge, carrying Grand Mira South Road, Marion Bridge carrying Nova Scotia Route 327, and Albert Bridge, carrying Nova Scotia Trunk 22, each bridge in their respective namesake communities. Over the years there have been several other bridges, conveying road or rail.

For over 140 years the mouth of the river was spanned by the Mira Gut Bridge, a swing bridge with two fixed truss spans, and a revolving middle span. First built as a railroad bridge for the Sydney and Louisburg Railway, and later converted to a road bridge carrying Mira Bay Drive, the bridge became structurally unsound, was deemed unrepairable by the Nova Scotia Department of Transportation and Infrastructure Renewal, and so was demolished and removed in November 2017. A new 80-metre (260 ft) truss bridge was under construction by the spring of 2021, and completed with an official opening on 5 August 2022. The new bridge does not have an opening span but has a 6.5-metre (21 ft) vertical clearance to accommodate boats. The new bridge cost $6.525 million.

The Mira Gut Bridge, along with Albert Bridge, have been known to be used as diving platforms by youths seeking adventure. The activity has not been as prevalent in recent years due to public fears of injury and liability, and to threats made by the Cape Breton Regional Police of fines or jail time for jumpers. The Gut bridge was used due to the high currents experienced at mid tide. Albert Bridge was used due to its height above water and the deep pool situated below the northwestern end of the bridge.

== See also ==
- List of rivers of Nova Scotia
