= Guting District =

District of Taipei, Taiwan

Coordinates: 25.0322107°N 121.5161579°E

Guting 古亭區 Kuting
- District
- Guting District
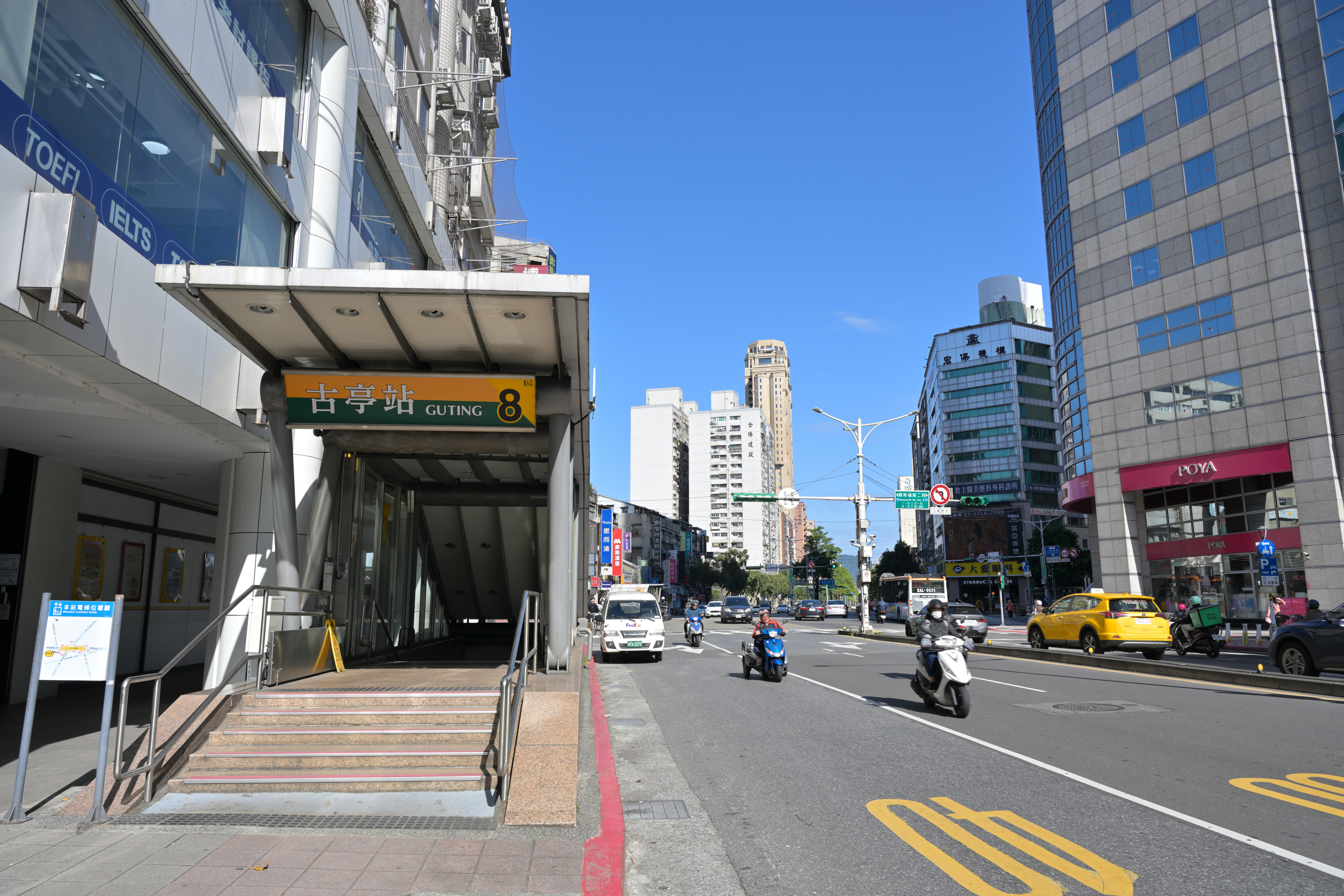
- Looking east down Heping Road in 2026
- Interactive map of Guting
- Country: Republic of China (Taiwan)
- Region: Southwestern Taipei
- Divisions: List: 54 villages; neighborhoods

Area
  - Total: 6.7 km^{2} (2.6 sq mi)

Population (1989)
  - Total: 186,257
  - Density: 28,000/km^{2} (72,000/sq mi)
- Postal code: 107

Guting District (Chinese: 古亭區; pinyin: Gǔtíng Qū) was a district in Taipei, Taiwan, located in the southwestern part of Taipei.

== History ==
The name “Guting” is derived from the ancient place name Ku-ting (Min Nan Chinese: Kóo-tîng).

After Taihoku City was established in 1920, in 1922, the Japanese Colonial Government carried out the Correction of Villages' Name (町名改正, chōmei kaisei). There were 11 villages (町, chō) in the area of later Guting District: Shineichō (新榮町), Chitosechō (千歳町), Kodamachō (兒玉町), Sakumachō (佐久間町), Nanmonchō (南門町), Ryūkōchō (龍口町), Babachō (馬場町), Kawabatachō (川端町), Koteichō (古亭町), Suidōchō (水道町) and Tomitachō (富田町).

In 1946, the Taiwan Province Administrative Official Public Ministry (臺灣省行政長官公署) made those villages incorporated as Guting District.

In 1990, 16 districts in Taipei City were consolidated into the current 12 districts. Most of Guting District were merged into Zhongzheng District along with Chengzhong District (城中區), moreover the rest were annexed into Daan District and Wanhua District.

== Geography ==
Guting District bordered Chengzhong District (城中區) to the north, Daan District (大安區) to the east, Shuangyuan District (雙園區) to the west and Longshan District (龍山區) to the northwest. The Xindian River run by its south.

== Education and medical institutions ==
=== Universities and Colleges ===
- National Taiwan University
- National Taiwan Normal University

=== High school ===
- Taipei Municipal Chien Kuo High School

=== Medical institutions ===
- Postal Hospital
- Women's and Children's Hospital (Fuyou Hospital)
- Heping Hospital
- Tri-Service General Hospital

== Government institutions ==
- Central Bank of the Republic of China
- Ministry of Finance of the Republic of China
- Ministry of Economic Affairs of the Republic of China
- Council of Agriculture of the Republic of China
- Taiwan Tobacco and Wine Monopoly Bureau
- Bureau of Labor Insurance

== Places of interest ==
- Youth Park
- Taipei Botanical Garden
- National Museum of History
- Taipei City Children's Museum of Transportation
