= Guts (Finnish TV series) =

2026 Finnish television series

- Genre: Psychological thriller
- Created by: Jemina Jokisalo
- Written by: Jemina Jokisalo; Daniela Hakulinen; Fanni Mikkonen; Tua Harno
- Directed by: Akseli Tuomivaara; Petra Lumioksa
- Starring: Roosa Söderholm; Sannah Nedergård; Reetta Ylä-Rautio; Edit Williams; Kreeta Salminen; Antti Virmavirta
- Country of origin: Finland
- Original language: Finnish

Production
- Production companies: Just Republic; Anagram Sweden; Staragara

Original release
- Network: Yle
- Release: 1 January 2026

Guts (Finnish: Kylmä kausi) is a Finnish psychological thriller television series created by Jemina Jokisalo. Set around a women's national cross-country skiing team, it was first broadcast by Yle on 1 January 2026. Roosa Söderholm won the performance prize at Canneseries in 2026 for her role in the series.

== Premise ==
The series follows two members of a women's national cross-country skiing team, Anna and Maria, who are prepared to sacrifice almost anything, including their mental health, to reach the top of the sport.

== Cast ==
- Roosa Söderholm as Anna
- Sannah Nedergård
- Reetta Ylä-Rautio
- Edit Williams
- Kreeta Salminen
- Antti Virmavirta

== Production ==
The series was created by Jemina Jokisalo, head of drama at the production company Just Republic, and written by Jokisalo with Daniela Hakulinen, Fanni Mikkonen and Tua Harno. Akseli Tuomivaara and Petra Lumioksa directed. Just Republic produced it with Anagram Sweden and the Slovenian company Staragara, with financing from Nordisk Film & TV Fond and international sales handled by About Premium Content.

Söderholm said the cast trained in skiing for more than two years before filming, and that she had expected the fictional world to be more dramatic than competitive skiing but found it was not.

== Release ==
Guts premiered on Yle on 1 January 2026, and was subsequently broadcast by SVT in February and NRK in March.

== Awards ==
At Canneseries in April 2026, Roosa Söderholm won the prize for best performance for her role as Anna.
