= Mira Gut =

Community in Nova Scotia, Canada

- Unincorporated community
- Interactive map of Mira Gut
- Coordinates: 46°2′20″N 59°57′57″W
- Country: Canada
- Province: Nova Scotia
- Regional municipality: Cape Breton Regional Municipality
- Time zone: UTC-4 (AST)
  - Summer (DST): UTC-3 (ADT)
- Forward sortation area: B1K
- Area codes: 902 and 782
- NTS Map: 011J04
- GNBC Code: CAZVR

Mira Gut is a small community in the Canadian province of Nova Scotia, located in the Cape Breton Regional Municipality on Cape Breton Island where the Mira River enters into Mira Bay through the geographical feature Mira Gut, for which the community is named.

== History ==
Mira Gut Beach is located on the former path of a coal mining railroad, the Sydney and Louisburg Railway (S&L), that used to run from Sydney to Louisbourg. Remains of the railroad can still be found along parts of the shore.

== Mira Gut Beach ==
Mira Gut Beach features both fresh and saltwater beaches and is a popular swimming area during the summer months. Recent improvements to the beach site include an expanded parking lot, a boardwalk, change houses, and a lifeguard hut. The Nova Scotia Lifeguard Service (NSLS) began supervision of Mira Gut Beach in 1996 under an agreement with the Cape Breton Regional Municipality.

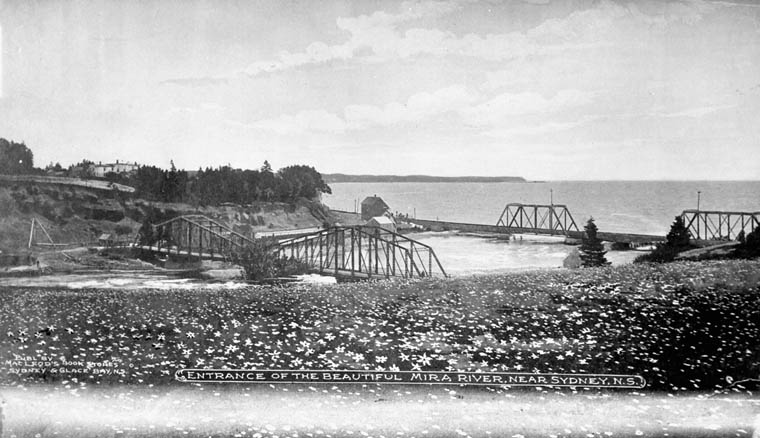
ca 1900-1925 "Publ. By MacLeod's Book Stores Sydney & Glace Bay, N.S. Entrance Of The Beautiful Mira River, Near Sydney, N.S." A view of the Mira Gut Road (nearer) and Sydney and Louisburg Railway (further) Bridges at the mouth of the Mira River where it empties into Mira Gut and Mira Bay. Both bridges had swing spans to allow vessels to travel up the Mira River. The nearer bridge was eventually demolished and the further Bridge in the photo was converted to carry the road once the railway shut down and has since been demolished.

== Mira Gut Bridge ==
In the early 1900s there were two bridges over Mira Gut, one for the S&L Railroad, and one for road traffic. Both bridges had swing spans to allow vessels to travel up the Mira River. When the S&L Railroad shutdown in the late 1970s road traffic was moved to the former railroad bridge. In November 2017, the Mira Gut Bridge was closed because the swing bridge no longer worked properly due to erosion of its foundations. At the time about 1,000 vehicles crossed the bridge daily.

Its replacement, an 80 metres (260 ft) hot-dip galvanized steel truss bridge with a 6.5-metre vertical clearance to accommodate boats, officially opened on 5 August 2022. Bob Martell was the bridge custodian and operator of the swing span for more than 36 years. He had the honour of cutting the ribbon for the new bridge. The new bridge cost $6.525 million and features a sidewalk, which can be used by cyclists, walkers and runners.
