= History of Taipei =

Historical population
Year	Pop.	±%
1875	38,000	—
1905	74,415	+95.8%
1920	162,782	+118.7%
1935	274,157	+68.4%
1958	715,000	+160.8%
1972	1,890,760	+164.4%
1980	2,220,427	+17.4%
1990	2,719,659	+22.5%
2000	2,646,474	−2.7%
2010	2,618,772	−1.0%
2020	2,602,418	−0.6%
Sources: 1875 1905-1935 1958 1972 1980 1985-2020 "Populations by city and country in Taiwan". Ministry of the Interior. May 2018.

The recorded history of Taipei began with the Han Chinese settling of the Taipei Basin in 1709, leading up to the formation of the national capital of Taiwan and high-tech industry hub and that is now Taipei City. Other notable dates include the 1895 annexation of Taiwan by Japan, during which Taipei began to grow more rapidly, and in the 1950s, the USA's provision of financial assistance to the Republic of China government, after which the city continued on a path of fast structural and industrial growth.

== First settlement ==
The region known as the Taipei basin was home to Ketagalan tribes before the 18th century. Han Chinese began to settle in the Taipei Basin in 1709.

By the late 19th century, the area of present-day Taipei was home to northern Taiwan's major Han settlements, in addition to the government-designated foreign trade port of Tamsui. The Taipei area's economic importance grew with increases in foreign trade, especially that related to tea exportation.

== First Chinese official development ==
In 1875, the northern part of Taiwan was separated from Taiwan Prefecture and incorporated into the new Taipeh Prefecture. Having been established adjoining the flourishing townships of Bangkah and Twatutia, the new prefectural capital was known as Chengnei (Chinese: 城內; pinyin: chéngnèi; Pe̍h-ōe-jī: siâⁿ-lāi; lit. 'walls-inside'). Administratively, the area was part of Tamsui County (modern-day Tamsui District) and the prefectural capital. In 1879, a prohibition against the planting of rice within the marked city limits was issued, and a portion of the land was designated for official purposes. The remaining portions were offered for sale for building purposes. By the end of 1879, the four city gates were almost complete, an Examination Hall was entirely completed, and the Confucian Temple and the Prefect's Yamen were under construction. All wealthy Chinese were compelled to contribute funds, but a large amount came from successful landowner "Lim Pan-ban", of the wealthy Banqiao Lin Family.

In 1885, work started to create an independent Fokien-Taiwan Province, which was officially declared in 1887. The capital of the island, or Taiwan-fu, was intended to be moved from the south to the center of the island, but was temporarily moved north to Taipeh.

The temporary capital of the new province was placed at Taipehfu. No sooner had this been decided upon than the city began to assume a new appearance, reflecting the energetic spirit of the governor. In 1885, the work of reconstruction commenced. A substantial wall was built to surround the city, streets were rearranged and paved with stone. A capacious yamen was constructed and the streets lit with electricity; this, we believe, being the first instance of the official adoption of electricity in any part of the empire. It was later found, however, that the system was too expensive, and, with the exception of the yamen, which continued to be thus illuminated, the lights were withdrawn.

— J. W. Davidson,

A new railway connecting the cities of Keelung and Taipeh (see Taiwan Railways Administration) became the earliest railroad system in China. However it did not achieve the original intent of connecting the new provincial capital in central Taiwan to a coastal port such as Keelung in the north due to construction delays. The authorities also had difficulty subduing the aboriginal population in central Taiwan. Taipeh remained the provincial capital until the Japanese takeover in 1895.

== Japanese rule and leadership ==
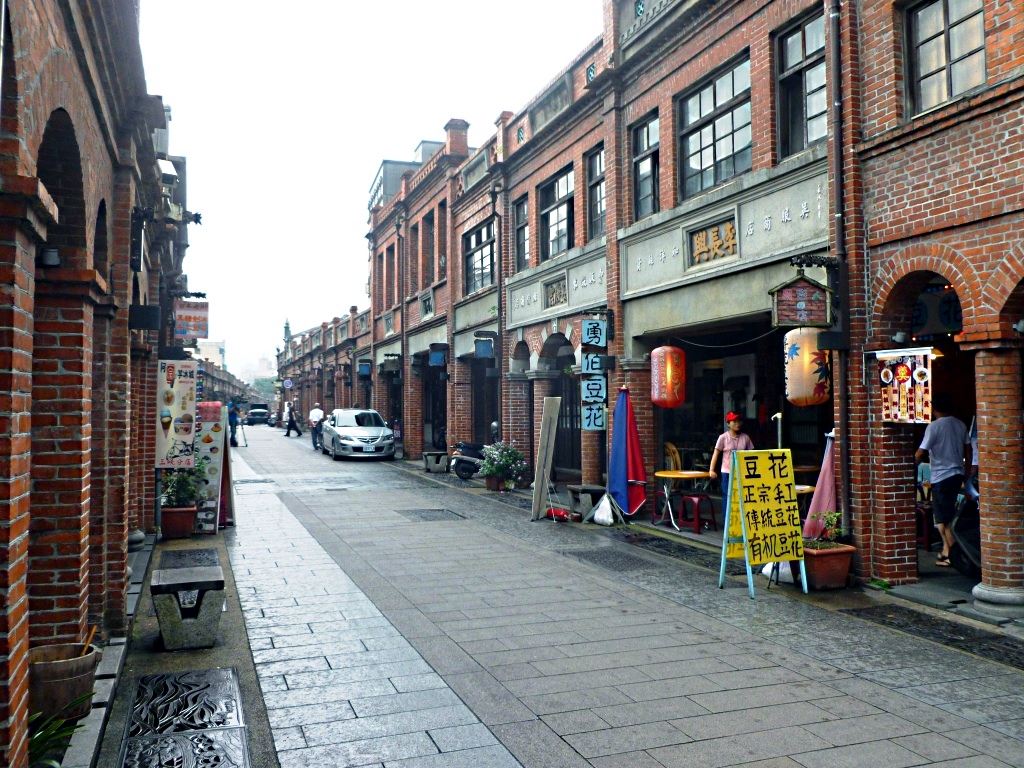
Old street in Taipei. 2013

As settlement for losing the Sino-Japanese War, China ceded the entire island of Taiwan to Japan in 1895. During the Japanese era, Taipei, called Taihoku in Japanese, emerged as the political center of the Japanese Colonial Government. In less than a decade after the cession, Taihoku was one of the few places in the island that had already gone from a thoroughly Chinese appearance to "a thoroughly Japanese city in every respect." Much of the architecture of Taipei dates from the Japanese era, including the Presidential Building which was the Office of the Governor-General of Taiwan.

In the early 20th century, a multitude of names were used to refer to the city and its suburbs. Taihoku proper was the part of the city within the city walls; the population was about 9,000, and the area was mainly occupied by Japanese officials and military. Twatutia (Daitōtei in Japanese, population 41,716) was outside the walls, where European settlers lived. It stretched northward along the Tamsui River, which flows down to the port, a distance of about 10 miles (16 km). Bangkah (Banka in Japanese, pop. 27,332) was inhabited by both Japanese and Chinese with a Chinese majority. The total population of all three cities combined was over 86,000 (non-military), 83% Chinese and 17% Japanese. The space current Taipei City occupies were subject to different Japanese city planning orders, including the Taipei Urban Improvement Plan Committee Regulations of 1897 and the Taiwan City Planning Order of 1936. The planning orders created urban facilities, use districts, and infrastructure outlines for the city.

In 1901, Taihoku Chō (臺北廳) was one of twenty districts established, and with a population of over 294,000, was the most populous district in the 1904 census. Taihoku was incorporated in 1920 as part of Taihoku Prefecture. It included Bangkah (now Wanhua), Twatutia, and Jōnai (城內) among other small settlements. The eastern village Matsuyama (松山庄; now Songshan and Xinyi District) was annexed into Taihoku City in 1938.

== Nationalist rule ==
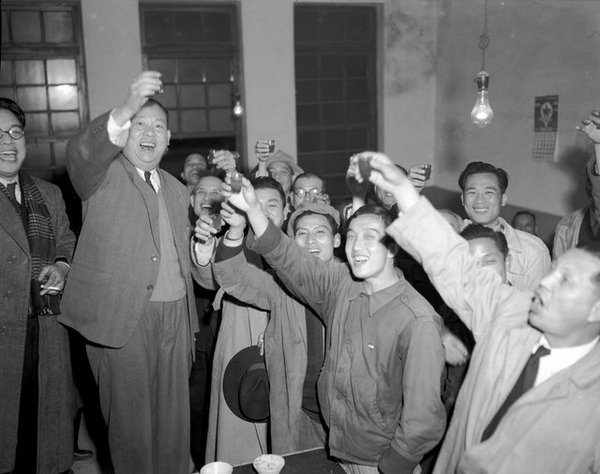
Non-Kuomintang Taiwanese politician Wu San-lien (2L) celebrated his landslide victory (65.5%) in the first-time Taipei city mayoral election in January 1951 with his supporters.

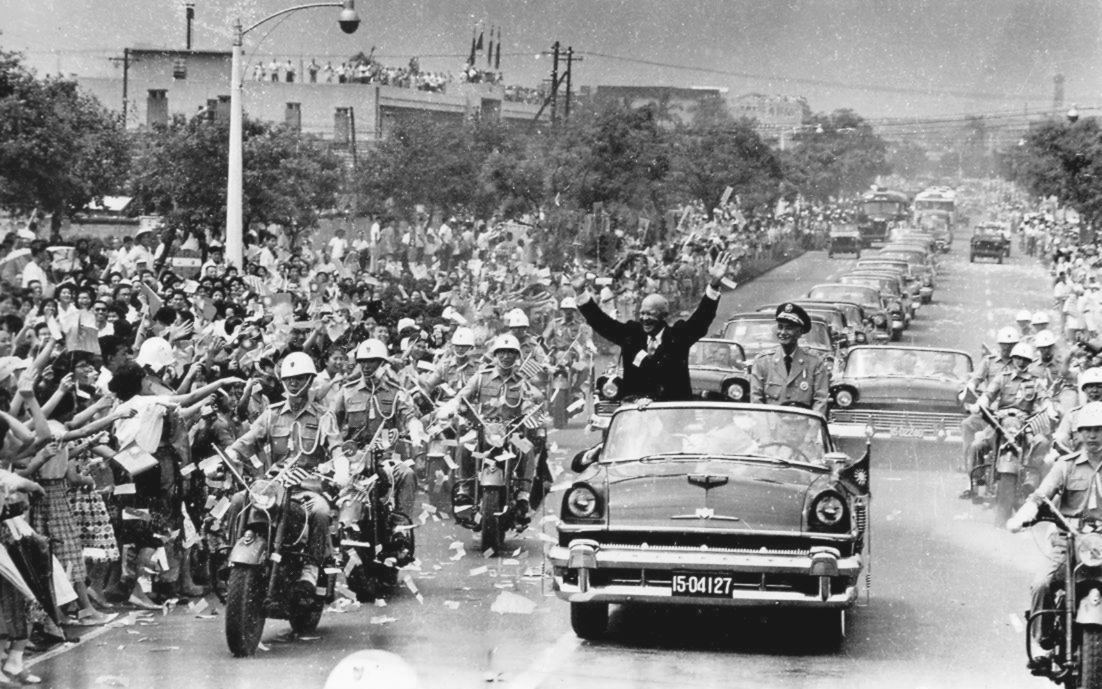
With President Chiang Kai-shek, the U.S. President Dwight D. Eisenhower waving to people during his visit to Taipei in June 1960.

Upon the Japanese defeat in the Pacific War and its consequent surrender in August 1945, Taiwan was taken over by Chinese Nationalist troops. Subsequently, a temporary Office of the Taiwan Province Administrative Governor (臺灣省行政長官公署) was established in Taipei City. In 1947 the KMT government under Chiang Kai-shek declared island-wide martial law in Taiwan as a result of the February 28 Incident, which began with incidents in Taipei but led to an island-wide crackdown on the local population by forces loyal to Chiang.

On December 7, 1949, the Kuomintang (KMT) government under Chiang Kai-shek established Taipei as the provisional capital of the ROC after the Communists forced them to flee mainland China. Taipei was also the capital of Taiwan Province until the 1956 when the provincial administration was moved to Chunghsing Village in central Taiwan. However, the PRC does not recognize this move and still regards Taipei as the provincial capital of Taiwan.

As approved on December 30, 1966 by Executive Yuan, Taipei became a centrally administered municipality on July 1, 1967. In the following year, Taipei City expanded again by annexing Shilin, Beitou, Neihu, Nangang, Jingmei and Muzha. In 1990, 16 districts in Taipei City were consolidated into the current 12 districts.

== New Taipei residents ==
After the 1990s, after two decades of building urban underground railway transit, highways, and the early Taipei Metro network, infrastructure such as bus lanes had to be completed to relieve pressure on traffic. In addition, Taipei has continued to construct a more convenient environment for humanities and education, and gradually developed towards a diverse, service-based economy. The security crisis of Pai Hsiao-yen's 1997 murder, the collapse of the East Star Building in the 921 earthquake events of 1999, 2001 loss of hundreds of millions of dollars in Typhoon Nari, 2002 drought, and water crisis of the 2003 SARS crisis and other major events have not affected Taipei's international process.

With Taipei 101 as its main landmark, Xinyi District has become the premier central business district of Taipei. On the other hand, while actively internationalizing, Taipei began to have traditional architecture. After 2000, paying attention to the content and quality of culture of Taiwan, Taipei began to promote a culture of equality and rights to reproduce historical memory, emphasizing traditional common people, promoting cultural industries and learning, releasing Taipei government resources, and creating a new culture for the Taipei metropolis.

== See also ==
- History of Taiwan

== Bibliography ==
- Davidson, James W. (1903). The Island of Formosa, Past and Present : history, people, resources, and commercial prospects : tea, camphor, sugar, gold, coal, sulphur, economical plants, and other productions. London and New York: Macmillan & co. OL 6931635M.
- Takekoshi, Yosaburō (1907). "Chapter XIII: Population and future development of the island resources". Japanese rule in Formosa. London, New York, Bombay and Calcutta: Longmans, Green, and co. OCLC 753129. OL 6986981M.
