= Marion Bridge, Nova Scotia =

Community in Nova Scotia, Canada

Marion Bridge Gaelic: Drochaid Mhira
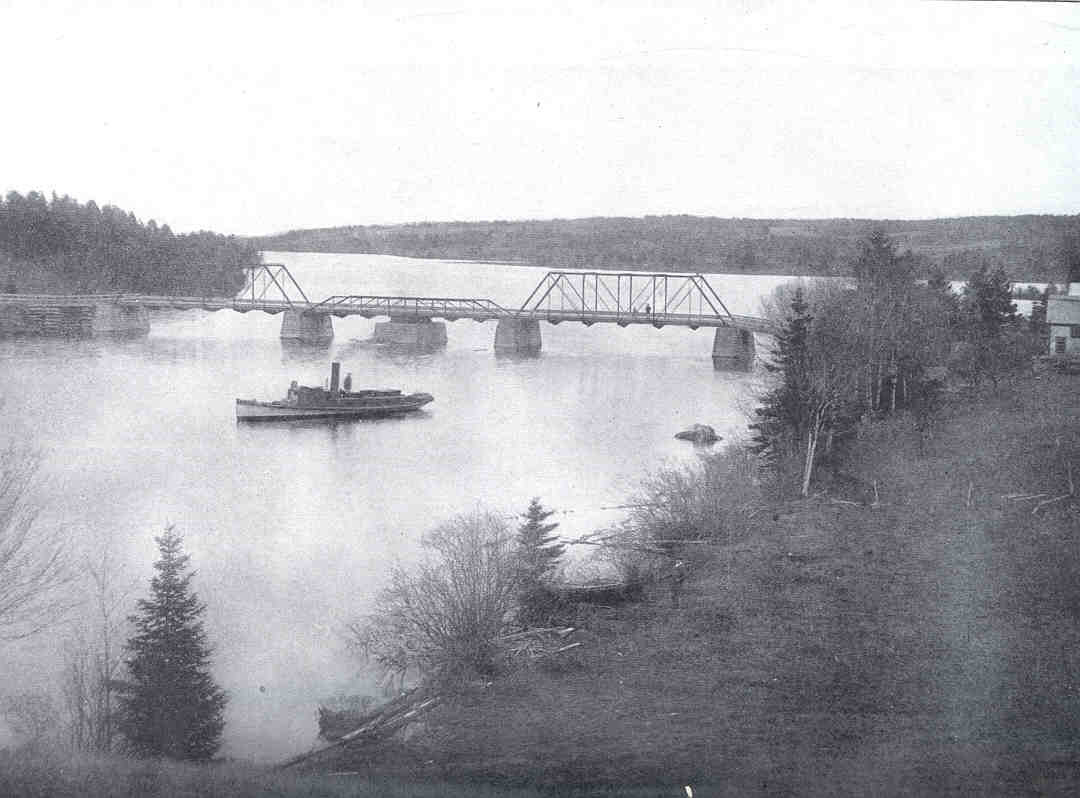
- The Marion Bridge in 1903

- Marion Bridge in Nova Scotia
- Country: Canada
- Province: Nova Scotia
- Municipality: Cape Breton Regional Municipality

Marion Bridge (Scottish Gaelic: Drochaid Mhira) (2001 pop.: 1711) is a community in the Canadian province of Nova Scotia, located in Cape Breton Regional Municipality.

The community is named for the eponymous bridge that crosses the Mira River, Marion Bridge being approximately midway between the river's source in Grand Mira and its discharge point at Mira Gut. The current concrete highway bridge was constructed in 1982 as a replacement for an older bridge, which collapsed after an accident involving a snow plow.

The area is a setting for the 2002 film Marion Bridge.

== Mira Gala ==
Marion Bridge plays host to the Mira Gala, an 11-day annual festival held every summer in late June/early July.

The first Mira Gala was held in August 1975 -- a one-day event with activities for children throughout the afternoon and concluded with a pageant and dance in the evening. The following year, 1976, the date was moved to July and included Canada Day celebrations. Since then, the Gala has grown in size and popularity, now encompassing several days and requiring many community volunteers.

The Mira Gala celebrates its 51st Anniversary this year (2026). The festival runs from June 25 to July 5, with events scheduled for all age groups. Canada Day, July 1st, will be a busy day. Plans are underway for a breakfast, street parade, children's games, a heritage fair, quilt show, BBQ, bake sales, Jazz at The Bridge, and events on the Mira River. In the evening there will be a boat parade and fireworks along the beautiful Mira River.

Other events throughout the week include an antique/custom car show; KitchenFest concert featuring the talented Evans & Doherty, Kenneth MacKenzie, Allie Bennett, and Adam Young; a kid's night; adult dance with Final Cut, Music on the Mira Concert at Bethel Church, and a Gathering of MacDonald's concert at Two Rivers Wildlife Park, featuring an exceptionally talented group of Cape Breton entertainers - Jason MacDonald, Howie MacDonald, Buddy MacDonald, and the Aaron MacDonald Band.
