= Victoria Bridge, Nova Scotia =

Community in Nova Scotia, Canada

Coordinates: 45°48′42.09″N 60°17′32.83″W

Victoria Bridge in Nova Scotia

Victoria Bridge is a community in the Canadian province of Nova Scotia, located in the Cape Breton Regional Municipality on Cape Breton Island.
