= Allister MacGillivray =

Canadian musician

Allister MacGillivray CM
- Born: 1948 (age 77–78); Glace Bay, Nova Scotia, Canada
- Occupations: Singer-songwriter, guitarist, music historian
- Instrument: Guitar

Allister MacGillivray CM, D. Litt (honors), is a Canadian singer/songwriter, guitarist, and music historian from the Cape Breton region of Nova Scotia. He was born January 17, 1948, in the coal-mining and fishing town of Glace Bay.

== Early life ==
He began performing at the age of seven, later became a boy chorister and, as a teen, sang in local folk bands. During his twenties and thirties, he traveled the world as a guitar accompanist with some prominent Celtic performers, including Ryan's Fancy, Makem & Clancy (Tommy Makem, Liam Clancy) and John Allan Cameron. With Cameron, he performed on the Grand Ole Opry in Nashville in 1970, earning a lengthy standing ovation and stealing the show from the likes of Hank Snow, Roy Rogers, and Bill Monroe. Since leaving the road, MacGillivray has lived close to the village of Marion Bridge, also known as Drochaid Mhira which remains strongly Canadian Gaelic-speaking.

== Early career ==
A well-respected author/composer, his most popular songs include: "Away From The Roll Of The Sea", "Coal Town Road", "Kitty Bawn O'Brien", "Tie Me Down", "Here's To Song", "Sea People", and "You'll Be Home Again" — all published by Cabot Trail Music (SOCAN). He is best known for a composition called "Song for the Mira" that provided the theme as well as the sound track for an Atlantic Canadian film, Marion Bridge. "Song For the Mira" has been translated into Italian, Dutch, French, Scots Gaelic, Japanese, and Mi' kmaq, is available on well over 300 recordings, and is a standard in the Canadian choral-music repertoire. One of the most recorded songs ever by an eastern Canadian writer, "Out On The Mira" (an alternate title) has been covered by Anne Murray, Foster & Allen, Celtic Thunder, Daniel O'Donnell, Denny Doherty (of The Mamas & The Papas), Noel Harrison, Phil Coulter, The Canadian Tenors, Frank Patterson, The Los Angeles Children's Chorus, and scores of other noted performers. In 2018, it was inducted into the Canadian Songwriters Hall of Fame.

Out on the Mira on warm afternoons
Old men go fishin' with black line and spoons.
And, if they catch nothing, they never complain;
I wish I was with them again.

(Chorus:)
Can you imagine a piece of the universe
More fit for princes and kings?
I'll trade you ten of your cities for Marion Bridge
And the pleasure it brings.

== Later career ==
In the mid-1970s, MacGillivray penned Coal Town Road for Fergus O'Byrne of Ryan's Fancy. The song was later adopted as part of the regular repertoire of folk groups like Cockersdale (England), The Clark Family Group which includes Timothy Jeffery Clark, Simon Clark, Noah Clark and Sophia Clark (Bridgewater, Nova Scotia) and The Barra MacNeils (Sydney Mines, Nova Scotia). Coal Town Road documents an important part of Canadian history in that Canada has experienced the same types of labor and environmental exploitation as the United States—and has reacted in similar song-style ways. Significantly, this song is sung by the Nova Scotian coal-miner group, The Men of the Deeps.

We never see the sun
Down the coal town road,
At a penny for the ton
Where the coal trains load.
When the shift comes up on top
We're so thankful to be done
We head home to sleep and dream
About the coal town road.

MacGillivray's songs are often performed by choral groups, with over 1000 choirs throughout the world performing his works in classical contexts. His Away from the Roll of the Sea is known in Italy as Vecchi Amici on YouTube and is sung in typically Italian operatic style by the group Coro Leone Bologna. The song has also been performed in Korean by The Hanyang University Male Choir, and is known in Taiwanese as 世紀尋跡 無垠聲情 on YouTube having been sung by The National Taiwan University Chorus.

Small craft in a harbour that's still and serene
Give no indication what their ways have been.
They rock at their moorings, all nestled in dreams
Away from the roll of the sea.

== Style and modern influence ==
Instrumentally, his songs have been arranged for bagpipes, brass quintet, recorder ensemble, jazz ensemble, ukulele ensemble, massed brass & pipe band, guitar, violin, piano, and symphony suite.

He is also one of the few composers to have a commercially produced alcoholic beverage named after one of his songs. "Cape Breton Silver", a specialty liquor made by Glenora Distillers and available in Nova Scotia outlets, was inspired by a MacGillivray composition of the same name.

You've heard of the miners who tunnel for coal;
The tale of their valour has often been told.
But there's one class of hero that's misunderstood:
The lads who mine silver in the Cape Breton woods.

MacGillivray concluded his singing & playing career in the early 1980s in order to write songs and books and to make films about the musical traditions of Cape Breton Island. He continues to write and arrange music, has released a compilation CD, and is involved in the operation of Sea-Cape Music Ltd., the company which distributes his books.

Books he has published include:

- Song For The Mira (1979), a collection of thirteen original songs.
- The Cape Breton Fiddler (1981), a historical and photographic look at Cape Breton's Scottish violin tradition.
- The Cape Breton Song Collection (1985), an anthology of the Island's best-loved compositions.
- A Cape Breton Ceilidh (1988), a historical and photographic look at Cape Breton's unique step-dancing and piano-playing traditions.
- The Nova Scotia Song Collection (1989). This anthology deals with the works of Hank Snow, Wilf Carter, Stan Rogers, Dr. Helen Creighton, etc.
- Diamonds In The Rough (Vols. 1 & 2), the story of The Men Of The Deeps, Cape Breton's coal mining chorus.
- Songs From The Mira (2001), a collection of thirty-two original songs.

His children, Ciarán and Fiona MacGillivray, are also noted performers in the Celtic-music field.

== Awards and accolades ==
He has a Bachelor of Arts degree (St. Francis Xavier University), has been awarded an honorary doctorate by The University College of Cape Breton, and has been designated The Official Bard of Clan MacGillivray Canada.

On December 13, 2013, he was appointed to the Order of Canada (2013). His citation of investiture to Rideau Hall reads as follows:

Cape Breton's musical heritage has been enriched by the contributions of Allister MacGillivray. A musician and composer, he is beloved for his original songs, many of which depict the traditional way of life of Cape Breton coal miners and fishermen. His compositions are popular with both professional and amateur choirs, notably his "Song for the Mira", considered a classic and translated into several languages. His various anthologies and publications about fiddling, step dancing, and the Gaelic language have also helped to preserve the island's traditional culture.

Allister MacGillivray, C.M., Albert Bridge (Nouvelle-Écosse)

Par sa contribution, Allister MacGillivray a enrichi le patrimoine musical du Cap Breton. Musicien et compositeur, il est extrêmement apprécié pour ses chansons originales, dont beaucoup évoquent le mode de vie traditionnel des mineurs et des pêcheurs du Cap Breton. Ses compositions sont populaires auprès des chœurs professionnels et amateurs, tout particulièrement son œuvre Song for the Mira, considérée aujourd'hui comme un classique et traduite en plusieurs langues. Ses différentes anthologies et publications sur le violon et la danse populaires ainsi que sur le gaélique ont aussi contribué à préserver la culture traditionnelle de l'île.

On May 6, 2018, in a ceremony in Halifax, NS, MacGillivray's "Song For the Mira" was inducted into The Canadian Songwriter's Hall of Fame.

On November 15, 2022, at Province House in Halifax, NS, Allister MacGillivray was presented with the Queen's Platinum Jubilee Medal in a ceremony conducted by Lieutenant-Governor LeBlanc.
