= The Gut (geological feature) =

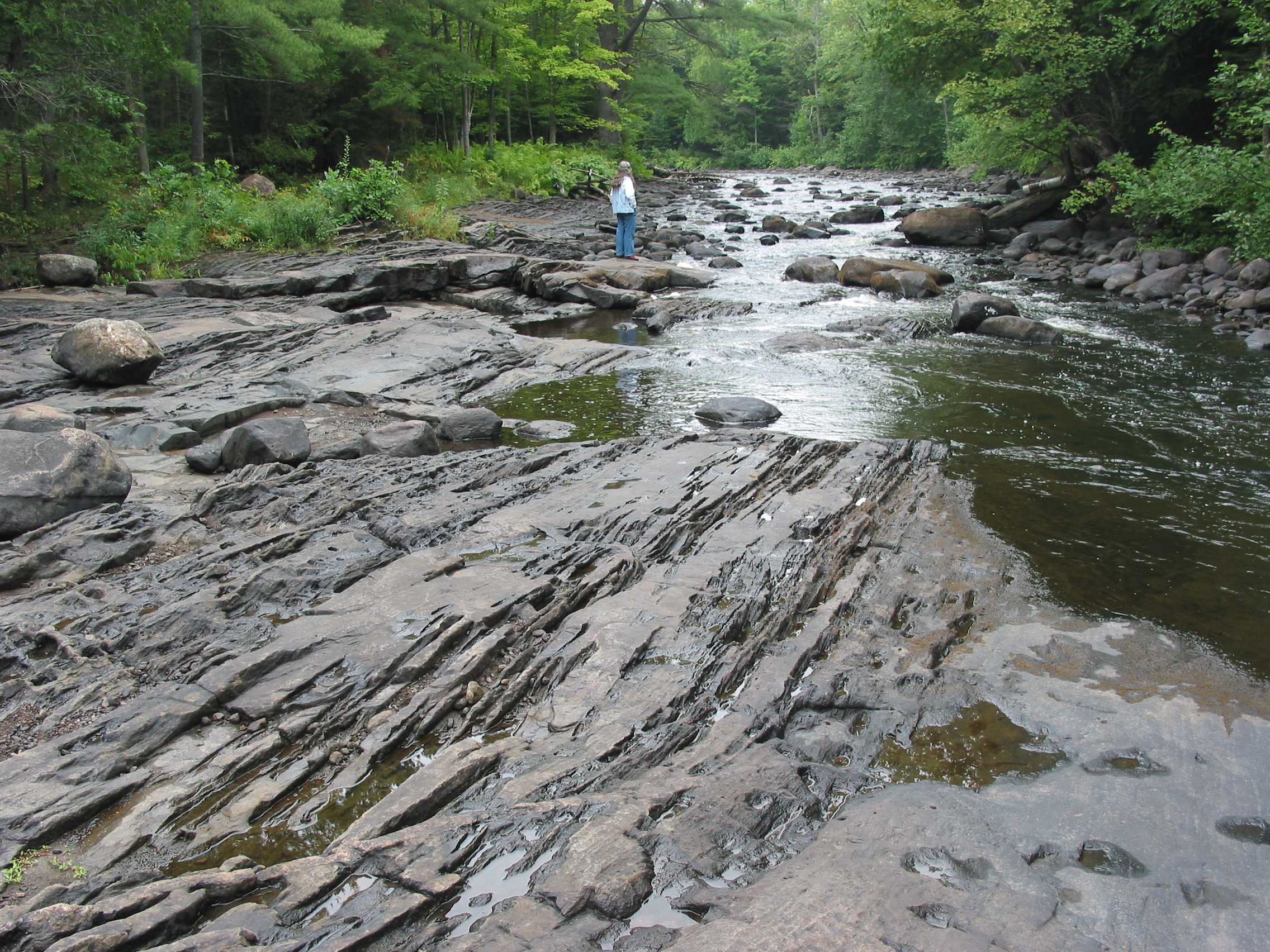
- The Crowe River flows over a Precambrian basalt lava ridge at 'The Gut'.
- Interactive map of The Gut
- Nearest city: Apsley, Ontario
- Coordinates: 44°46′0.948″N 77°52′24.805″W
- Operator: Crowe Valley Conservation Authority

The Gut is a geological feature and conservation area east of Apsley, Ontario, Canada, with unusual Precambrian rock formations and a waterfall. A branch of the Crowe River which passes through the conservation area flows over an exposed basalt lava ridge, part of the Canadian Shield, then turns sharply and cascades into a deep gorge formed by a fault in the ridge, continuing downstream in a series of rapids and pools.

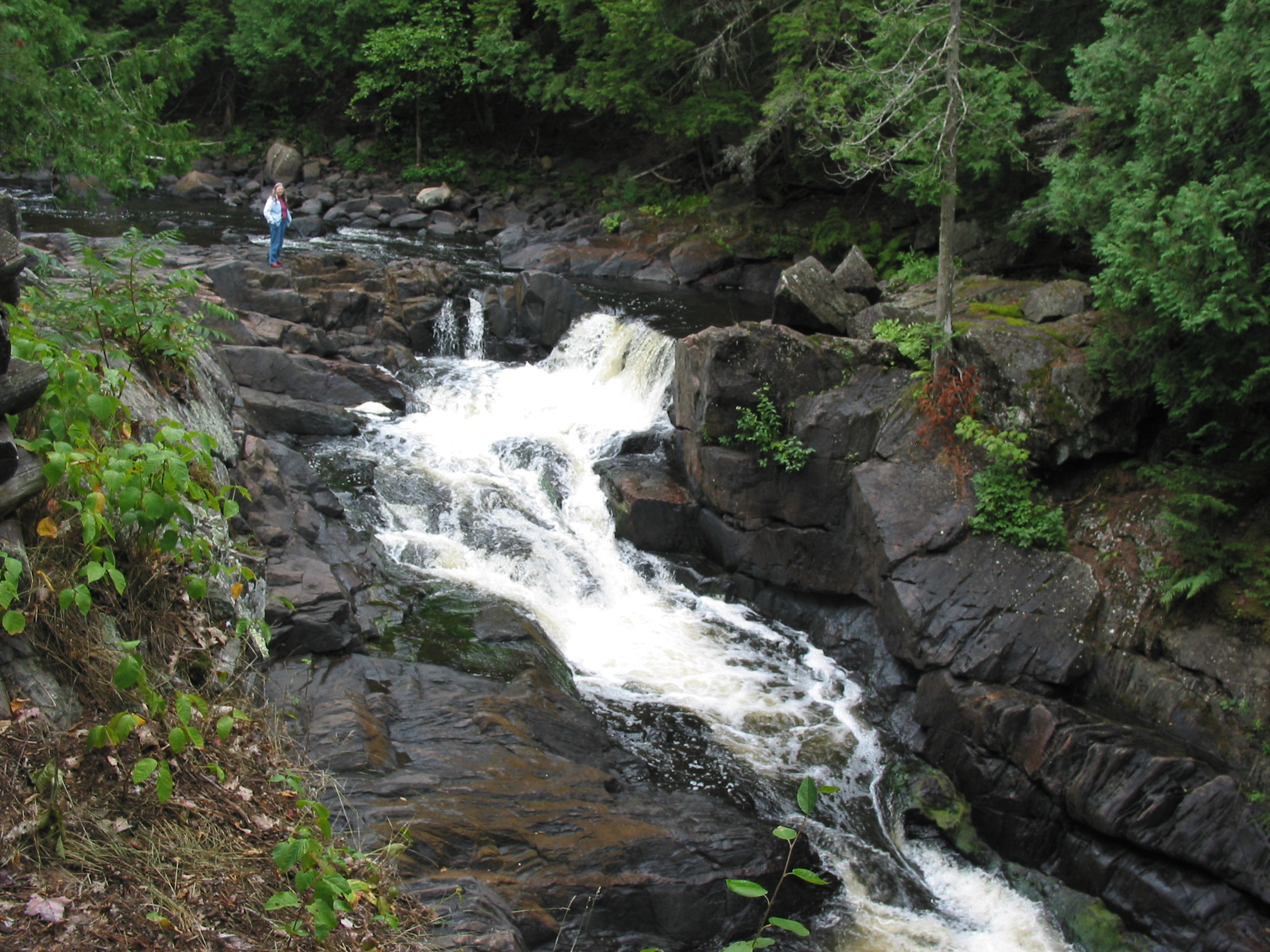
The Crowe River flows over a waterfall and into a deep gorge at 'The Gut'.

The origin of the unusual name is not known, but locals speculate that it may refer to the narrowing of the river or to the dangers of this area when the river was used for logging.

The conservation area is maintained by the Crowe Valley Conservation Authority, a non-profit organization, and by local volunteers.

As well as picnicking, wading, sightseeing and hiking, the area is also popular with bird watchers.

== See also ==
- Crowe River
