= The Guts! =

Video game series

Theガッツ! (The Gattsu!)
- Genre: Erotic
- Video games
- Theガッツ! (1999); Theガッツ!Remix (2001); Theガッツ!2 〜海でガッツ!〜 (2000); Theガッツ!3 〜山でガッツ!〜 (2001); Theガッツ!4 〜私立ガッツ学園!〜 (2002); Theガッツ!5 (2003); Theガッツ!6 〜麻雀でガッツ!〜／Theガッツ!麻雀 (unreleased); Theガッツ! -マキシマム・マタニティ!- (2012)
- Original video animation
- Studio: Animac
- Licensed by: Kitty Media
- Released: February 25, 2005 – September 22, 2005
- Runtime: 60 minutes
- Episodes: 2

The Guts! (Theガッツ!, The Gattsu!) is a series of eroge video games developed by May-Be SOFT and Complet's.

== Plot ==
Akiyoshi Nakajima is a young man who has just been rejected by his girlfriend for not being athletic enough. The newly dumped Akiyoshi struggles to find a way to obtain a "strong and manly aura", and on an impulse, begins working at a construction site. However, he is shocked to find most of the other workers on this site are women. Many of these women take a special interest in Akiyoshi; much of his work on the site seems to be performing sexual services rather than building things.

Akiyoshi gets to know a number of his female coworkers - the hiring manager who wishes to test his "stamina", a buff bodybuilder woman who loves ribbing on her male coworkers, an oversexed office assistant, a girl who disguises herself as a male employee, and more. At one point, Akiyoshi is even sent out to deal with a tenant near the construction site, an adult manga artist who works nights and sleeps days, but can't sleep because of all the work nearby. Over the course of the series, Akiyoshi is intimately dominated by a variety of women, usually in a comical manner.

== Media ==
=== Video game ===
The first title in the series came out in 1999 with the release of Theガッツ! (The Guts!). Since then, there have been seven releases in the series including a remake of the original and five sequels. The series is set in the same world as Boku no Himitsu Taiken and Taka even makes a cameo in the sequel, Boku no "Natsuyasumi" Himitsu Taiken.

=== OVA ===
A two-part episode OVA was produced by Animac and the series was licensed by Media Blasters and distributed in the U.S. and Canada through its label, Kitty Media under the title Women at Work.

==== Cast ====
- Yumechiyo Umeboshimaru as Akiyoshi Nakajima
- Mai Fujii as Akira Hayasaka
- Minami Hokuto as Mutsuki Oshima
- Yuina Nomoto as Minako Takahara
- Asuka Houjou as Hiroko Miike
- Haruka Fukai as Fumiko
- Kaeru Haruno as Akiyoshi's ex-girlfriend
- Rumi as Harumi Tanikawa
