= Gut (surname) =

Gut, Guts or Gūts is a surname. Notable people with the surname include:

- Alina Gut (born 1938), Polish parliamentarian
- Andrzej Gut-Mostowy (born 1960), Polish politician
- Gatis Gūts (born 1976), Latvian bobsledder
- Irene Gut Opdyke (née Irena Gut, 1922–2003), Polish nurse who gained recognition for aiding Jews persecuted by the Nazis during World War II
- Karel Gut (1927–2014), Czech ice hockey player
- Lara Gut (born 1991), Swiss alpine ski racer
- Max Gut (1898–1988), Swiss mathematician
- Zbigniew Gut (1949–2010), Polish footballer
