= List of minor planets: 497001–498000 =

The following is a partial list of minor planets, running from minor-planet number 497001 through 498000, inclusive. The primary data for this and other partial lists is based on JPL's "Small-Body Orbital Elements" and data available from the Minor Planet Center. Critical list information is also provided by the MPC, unless otherwise specified from Lowell Observatory. A detailed description of the table's columns and additional sources are given on the main page including a complete list of every page in this series, and a statistical break-up on the dynamical classification of minor planets.

Also see the summary list of all named bodies in numerical and alphabetical order, and the corresponding naming citations for the number range of this particular list. New namings may only be added to this list after official publication, as the preannouncement of names is condemned by the Working Group for Small Bodies Nomenclature of the International Astronomical Union.

| Near-Earth obj. | MBA (inner) | MBA (outer) | Centaur |
| Mars-crosser | MBA (middle) | Jupiter trojan | Trans-Neptunian obj. |
| Unclassified |

== 497001–497100 ==
| Designation | | | Discovery | | | Properties | | Ref |
| Permanent | Provisional | Named after | Date | Site | Discoverer(s) | Category | Diam. | Ref |
|---|---|---|---|---|---|---|---|---|
| 497001 | 2002 UC_{43} | — | October 30, 2002 | Kitt Peak | Spacewatch | · | 1.4 km | MPC · JPL |
| 497002 | 2002 UH_{64} | — | October 30, 2002 | Apache Point | SDSS | MAS | 590 m | MPC · JPL |
| 497003 | 2002 UG_{78} | — | October 29, 2002 | Palomar | NEAT | T_{j} (2.99) · 3:2 | 4.8 km | MPC · JPL |
| 497004 | 2002 VN_{14} | — | November 6, 2002 | Socorro | LINEAR | · | 470 m | MPC · JPL |
| 497005 | 2002 XN_{99} | — | November 6, 2002 | Socorro | LINEAR | PHO | 1.6 km | MPC · JPL |
| 497006 | 2002 YE_{12} | — | December 31, 2002 | Socorro | LINEAR | · | 580 m | MPC · JPL |
| 497007 | 2003 AO_{22} | — | January 5, 2003 | Socorro | LINEAR | · | 1.0 km | MPC · JPL |
| 497008 | 2003 BG_{3} | — | January 24, 2003 | La Silla | A. Boattini, H. Scholl | · | 950 m | MPC · JPL |
| 497009 | 2003 BU_{35} | — | January 29, 2003 | Socorro | LINEAR | T_{j} (2.77) | 3.2 km | MPC · JPL |
| 497010 | 2003 BJ_{36} | — | January 26, 2003 | Kitt Peak | Spacewatch | · | 2.7 km | MPC · JPL |
| 497011 | 2003 BA_{82} | — | January 27, 2003 | Wrightwood | J. W. Young | · | 890 m | MPC · JPL |
| 497012 | 2003 BE_{83} | — | January 31, 2003 | Socorro | LINEAR | · | 1.4 km | MPC · JPL |
| 497013 | 2003 DT_{10} | — | February 27, 2003 | Campo Imperatore | CINEOS | H | 560 m | MPC · JPL |
| 497014 | 2003 ED_{19} | — | March 6, 2003 | Anderson Mesa | LONEOS | · | 1.4 km | MPC · JPL |
| 497015 | 2003 FX_{65} | — | March 26, 2003 | Kitt Peak | Spacewatch | · | 1.7 km | MPC · JPL |
| 497016 | 2003 FC_{74} | — | March 26, 2003 | Haleakala | NEAT | · | 1.2 km | MPC · JPL |
| 497017 | 2003 FS_{103} | — | March 24, 2003 | Kitt Peak | Spacewatch | · | 1.4 km | MPC · JPL |
| 497018 | 2003 GJ_{51} | — | April 6, 2003 | Bergisch Gladbach | W. Bickel | · | 1.4 km | MPC · JPL |
| 497019 | 2003 GN_{51} | — | April 9, 2003 | Palomar | NEAT | · | 320 m | MPC · JPL |
| 497020 | 2003 HY | — | March 24, 2003 | Kitt Peak | Spacewatch | H | 520 m | MPC · JPL |
| 497021 | 2003 HB_{29} | — | April 28, 2003 | Socorro | LINEAR | · | 1.5 km | MPC · JPL |
| 497022 | 2003 KB_{36} | — | May 29, 2003 | Kitt Peak | Spacewatch | · | 2.4 km | MPC · JPL |
| 497023 | 2003 LX_{7} | — | June 1, 2003 | Cerro Tololo | M. W. Buie | · | 1.6 km | MPC · JPL |
| 497024 | 2003 QS_{1} | — | August 19, 2003 | Campo Imperatore | CINEOS | · | 690 m | MPC · JPL |
| 497025 | 2003 QW_{30} | — | August 24, 2003 | Socorro | LINEAR | APO | 260 m | MPC · JPL |
| 497026 | 2003 QP_{49} | — | August 22, 2003 | Palomar | NEAT | · | 550 m | MPC · JPL |
| 497027 | 2003 QE_{73} | — | August 25, 2003 | Socorro | LINEAR | · | 1.0 km | MPC · JPL |
| 497028 | 2003 QG_{93} | — | August 27, 2003 | Palomar | NEAT | · | 1.8 km | MPC · JPL |
| 497029 | 2003 QL_{95} | — | August 30, 2003 | Kitt Peak | Spacewatch | · | 670 m | MPC · JPL |
| 497030 | 2003 QV_{117} | — | August 26, 2003 | Cerro Tololo | M. W. Buie | MRX | 750 m | MPC · JPL |
| 497031 | 2003 RC_{4} | — | September 1, 2003 | Socorro | LINEAR | · | 750 m | MPC · JPL |
| 497032 | 2003 SG | — | September 17, 2003 | Anderson Mesa | LONEOS | · | 510 m | MPC · JPL |
| 497033 | 2003 SF_{1} | — | September 16, 2003 | Kitt Peak | Spacewatch | V | 530 m | MPC · JPL |
| 497034 | 2003 SX_{8} | — | September 17, 2003 | Kitt Peak | Spacewatch | · | 760 m | MPC · JPL |
| 497035 | 2003 SA_{29} | — | September 18, 2003 | Palomar | NEAT | · | 810 m | MPC · JPL |
| 497036 | 2003 SA_{32} | — | September 16, 2003 | Kitt Peak | Spacewatch | · | 530 m | MPC · JPL |
| 497037 | 2003 SO_{60} | — | September 17, 2003 | Kitt Peak | Spacewatch | · | 1.8 km | MPC · JPL |
| 497038 | 2003 SC_{121} | — | September 17, 2003 | Socorro | LINEAR | · | 840 m | MPC · JPL |
| 497039 | 2003 SP_{161} | — | September 18, 2003 | Kitt Peak | Spacewatch | · | 650 m | MPC · JPL |
| 497040 | 2003 SF_{164} | — | September 20, 2003 | Anderson Mesa | LONEOS | · | 820 m | MPC · JPL |
| 497041 | 2003 SQ_{166} | — | September 21, 2003 | Socorro | LINEAR | · | 1.8 km | MPC · JPL |
| 497042 | 2003 SO_{197} | — | September 21, 2003 | Anderson Mesa | LONEOS | · | 750 m | MPC · JPL |
| 497043 | 2003 SA_{216} | — | September 20, 2003 | Socorro | LINEAR | · | 2.1 km | MPC · JPL |
| 497044 | 2003 SR_{278} | — | September 30, 2003 | Socorro | LINEAR | · | 550 m | MPC · JPL |
| 497045 | 2003 SQ_{281} | — | September 19, 2003 | Kitt Peak | Spacewatch | MRX | 1.0 km | MPC · JPL |
| 497046 | 2003 SC_{287} | — | September 29, 2003 | Kitt Peak | Spacewatch | · | 1.6 km | MPC · JPL |
| 497047 | 2003 SD_{287} | — | September 29, 2003 | Kitt Peak | Spacewatch | HOF | 2.1 km | MPC · JPL |
| 497048 | 2003 SG_{298} | — | September 18, 2003 | Haleakala | NEAT | · | 840 m | MPC · JPL |
| 497049 | 2003 SW_{324} | — | September 17, 2003 | Kitt Peak | Spacewatch | · | 500 m | MPC · JPL |
| 497050 | 2003 SV_{327} | — | September 19, 2003 | Kitt Peak | Spacewatch | · | 1.1 km | MPC · JPL |
| 497051 | 2003 SW_{327} | — | September 19, 2003 | Anderson Mesa | LONEOS | · | 850 m | MPC · JPL |
| 497052 | 2003 SO_{342} | — | September 17, 2003 | Kitt Peak | Spacewatch | PHO | 790 m | MPC · JPL |
| 497053 | 2003 SA_{345} | — | September 18, 2003 | Kitt Peak | Spacewatch | · | 2.1 km | MPC · JPL |
| 497054 | 2003 SK_{353} | — | September 20, 2003 | Anderson Mesa | LONEOS | · | 1.8 km | MPC · JPL |
| 497055 | 2003 SJ_{371} | — | September 26, 2003 | Apache Point | SDSS | (13314) | 1.6 km | MPC · JPL |
| 497056 | 2003 SY_{371} | — | September 26, 2003 | Apache Point | SDSS | (13314) | 1.4 km | MPC · JPL |
| 497057 | 2003 SY_{411} | — | September 28, 2003 | Apache Point | SDSS | · | 1.7 km | MPC · JPL |
| 497058 | 2003 SZ_{428} | — | September 19, 2003 | Kitt Peak | Spacewatch | · | 580 m | MPC · JPL |
| 497059 | 2003 SA_{430} | — | September 29, 2003 | Anderson Mesa | LONEOS | · | 2.7 km | MPC · JPL |
| 497060 | 2003 TX_{58} | — | October 1, 2003 | Kitt Peak | Spacewatch | · | 500 m | MPC · JPL |
| 497061 | 2003 UF_{25} | — | October 19, 2003 | Palomar | NEAT | (18466) | 2.4 km | MPC · JPL |
| 497062 | 2003 UO_{32} | — | October 16, 2003 | Kitt Peak | Spacewatch | · | 1.0 km | MPC · JPL |
| 497063 | 2003 UD_{40} | — | October 16, 2003 | Kitt Peak | Spacewatch | · | 980 m | MPC · JPL |
| 497064 | 2003 UK_{48} | — | October 16, 2003 | Anderson Mesa | LONEOS | · | 2.4 km | MPC · JPL |
| 497065 | 2003 UU_{69} | — | October 18, 2003 | Kitt Peak | Spacewatch | · | 670 m | MPC · JPL |
| 497066 | 2003 UL_{102} | — | October 15, 2003 | Anderson Mesa | LONEOS | · | 2.1 km | MPC · JPL |
| 497067 | 2003 UC_{144} | — | October 18, 2003 | Anderson Mesa | LONEOS | · | 1.8 km | MPC · JPL |
| 497068 | 2003 UP_{165} | — | October 21, 2003 | Kitt Peak | Spacewatch | · | 670 m | MPC · JPL |
| 497069 | 2003 UC_{174} | — | October 21, 2003 | Kitt Peak | Spacewatch | NYS | 930 m | MPC · JPL |
| 497070 | 2003 UP_{232} | — | October 24, 2003 | Socorro | LINEAR | NYS | 640 m | MPC · JPL |
| 497071 | 2003 UL_{254} | — | October 19, 2003 | Kitt Peak | Spacewatch | · | 840 m | MPC · JPL |
| 497072 | 2003 UA_{352} | — | October 19, 2003 | Apache Point | SDSS | NYS | 810 m | MPC · JPL |
| 497073 | 2003 UO_{358} | — | October 19, 2003 | Kitt Peak | Spacewatch | · | 1.2 km | MPC · JPL |
| 497074 | 2003 UB_{392} | — | October 22, 2003 | Apache Point | SDSS | V | 460 m | MPC · JPL |
| 497075 | 2003 UR_{407} | — | October 23, 2003 | Apache Point | SDSS | · | 2.0 km | MPC · JPL |
| 497076 | 2003 VP_{2} | — | November 14, 2003 | Palomar | NEAT | · | 830 m | MPC · JPL |
| 497077 | 2003 WJ_{2} | — | November 16, 2003 | Kitt Peak | Spacewatch | · | 820 m | MPC · JPL |
| 497078 | 2003 WO_{2} | — | October 20, 2003 | Kitt Peak | Spacewatch | · | 1.2 km | MPC · JPL |
| 497079 | 2003 WR_{15} | — | November 16, 2003 | Kitt Peak | Spacewatch | · | 640 m | MPC · JPL |
| 497080 | 2003 WD_{25} | — | November 16, 2003 | Kitt Peak | Spacewatch | · | 770 m | MPC · JPL |
| 497081 | 2003 WQ_{42} | — | November 23, 2003 | Catalina | CSS | · | 1.6 km | MPC · JPL |
| 497082 | 2003 WS_{59} | — | November 18, 2003 | Kitt Peak | Spacewatch | · | 830 m | MPC · JPL |
| 497083 | 2003 WW_{59} | — | October 24, 2003 | Socorro | LINEAR | · | 870 m | MPC · JPL |
| 497084 | 2003 WC_{83} | — | November 20, 2003 | Palomar | NEAT | PHO | 800 m | MPC · JPL |
| 497085 | 2003 WS_{91} | — | November 18, 2003 | Kitt Peak | Spacewatch | · | 690 m | MPC · JPL |
| 497086 | 2003 WM_{160} | — | November 19, 2003 | Kitt Peak | Spacewatch | · | 720 m | MPC · JPL |
| 497087 | 2003 WG_{165} | — | November 30, 2003 | Kitt Peak | Spacewatch | · | 830 m | MPC · JPL |
| 497088 | 2003 XB_{24} | — | December 1, 2003 | Kitt Peak | Spacewatch | · | 880 m | MPC · JPL |
| 497089 | 2003 XT_{27} | — | November 21, 2003 | Kitt Peak | Spacewatch | BRA | 1.2 km | MPC · JPL |
| 497090 | 2003 XB_{30} | — | December 1, 2003 | Kitt Peak | Spacewatch | NYS | 800 m | MPC · JPL |
| 497091 | 2003 YO_{6} | — | December 17, 2003 | Anderson Mesa | LONEOS | · | 760 m | MPC · JPL |
| 497092 | 2003 YA_{15} | — | November 20, 2003 | Socorro | LINEAR | PHO | 870 m | MPC · JPL |
| 497093 | 2003 YP_{146} | — | December 19, 2003 | Socorro | LINEAR | · | 1.2 km | MPC · JPL |
| 497094 | 2004 AH | — | January 10, 2004 | Anderson Mesa | LONEOS | AMO | 590 m | MPC · JPL |
| 497095 | 2004 AB_{7} | — | December 19, 2003 | Kitt Peak | Spacewatch | · | 3.2 km | MPC · JPL |
| 497096 | 2004 BW_{1} | — | January 16, 2004 | Kitt Peak | Spacewatch | AMO | 620 m | MPC · JPL |
| 497097 | 2004 BW_{7} | — | January 17, 2004 | Kitt Peak | Spacewatch | · | 1.9 km | MPC · JPL |
| 497098 | 2004 BS_{65} | — | December 21, 2003 | Kitt Peak | Spacewatch | · | 2.2 km | MPC · JPL |
| 497099 | 2004 BB_{85} | — | January 29, 2004 | Socorro | LINEAR | · | 1.5 km | MPC · JPL |
| 497100 | 2004 BQ_{143} | — | December 18, 2003 | Kitt Peak | Spacewatch | MAS | 590 m | MPC · JPL |

== 497101–497200 ==
back to top

| Designation | | | Discovery | | | Properties | | Ref |
| Permanent | Provisional | Named after | Date | Site | Discoverer(s) | Category | Diam. | Ref |
|---|---|---|---|---|---|---|---|---|
| 497101 | 2004 BT_{149} | — | January 16, 2004 | Kitt Peak | Spacewatch | V | 610 m | MPC · JPL |
| 497102 | 2004 BO_{153} | — | December 28, 2003 | Kitt Peak | Spacewatch | · | 1.5 km | MPC · JPL |
| 497103 | 2004 BO_{160} | — | January 22, 2004 | Cerro Paranal | Cerro Paranal | · | 2.1 km | MPC · JPL |
| 497104 | 2004 CX | — | January 26, 2004 | Anderson Mesa | LONEOS | THM | 2.3 km | MPC · JPL |
| 497105 | 2004 CH_{8} | — | February 11, 2004 | Kitt Peak | Spacewatch | · | 2.0 km | MPC · JPL |
| 497106 | 2004 CC_{9} | — | January 28, 2004 | Kitt Peak | Spacewatch | · | 2.1 km | MPC · JPL |
| 497107 | 2004 CA_{53} | — | February 11, 2004 | Kitt Peak | Spacewatch | EUP | 2.6 km | MPC · JPL |
| 497108 | 2004 DP_{54} | — | February 22, 2004 | Kitt Peak | Spacewatch | H | 370 m | MPC · JPL |
| 497109 | 2004 DV_{55} | — | February 12, 2004 | Kitt Peak | Spacewatch | · | 2.2 km | MPC · JPL |
| 497110 | 2004 DG_{63} | — | February 17, 2004 | Kitt Peak | Spacewatch | · | 2.6 km | MPC · JPL |
| 497111 | 2004 DE_{64} | — | February 17, 2004 | Socorro | LINEAR | · | 2.7 km | MPC · JPL |
| 497112 | 2004 EH | — | March 11, 2004 | Palomar | NEAT | · | 1.4 km | MPC · JPL |
| 497113 | 2004 EK_{1} | — | March 14, 2004 | Socorro | LINEAR | APO | 120 m | MPC · JPL |
| 497114 | 2004 EF_{51} | — | March 14, 2004 | Kitt Peak | Spacewatch | TIR | 2.1 km | MPC · JPL |
| 497115 | 2004 EL_{58} | — | March 15, 2004 | Catalina | CSS | · | 1.7 km | MPC · JPL |
| 497116 | 2004 EX_{104} | — | March 15, 2004 | Kitt Peak | Spacewatch | · | 1.4 km | MPC · JPL |
| 497117 | 2004 FU_{4} | — | March 20, 2004 | Socorro | LINEAR | APO · PHA | 760 m | MPC · JPL |
| 497118 | 2004 FM_{23} | — | March 17, 2004 | Kitt Peak | Spacewatch | · | 1.6 km | MPC · JPL |
| 497119 | 2004 FL_{119} | — | March 23, 2004 | Kitt Peak | Spacewatch | · | 2.1 km | MPC · JPL |
| 497120 | 2004 FO_{135} | — | March 27, 2004 | Socorro | LINEAR | · | 1.4 km | MPC · JPL |
| 497121 | 2004 GY_{19} | — | April 13, 2004 | Desert Eagle | W. K. Y. Yeung | · | 1.1 km | MPC · JPL |
| 497122 | 2004 GM_{48} | — | April 12, 2004 | Kitt Peak | Spacewatch | LIX | 4.2 km | MPC · JPL |
| 497123 | 2004 KP_{3} | — | May 16, 2004 | Socorro | LINEAR | · | 2.1 km | MPC · JPL |
| 497124 | 2004 LL_{23} | — | June 15, 2004 | Socorro | LINEAR | BAR | 1.5 km | MPC · JPL |
| 497125 | 2004 NG_{4} | — | July 11, 2004 | Socorro | LINEAR | H | 620 m | MPC · JPL |
| 497126 | 2004 NO_{6} | — | July 11, 2004 | Socorro | LINEAR | · | 1.6 km | MPC · JPL |
| 497127 | 2004 NR_{23} | — | July 14, 2004 | Socorro | LINEAR | · | 1.4 km | MPC · JPL |
| 497128 | 2004 PU_{19} | — | August 8, 2004 | Anderson Mesa | LONEOS | · | 1.6 km | MPC · JPL |
| 497129 | 2004 PC_{31} | — | August 8, 2004 | Socorro | LINEAR | · | 1.4 km | MPC · JPL |
| 497130 | 2004 PC_{67} | — | July 14, 2004 | Siding Spring | SSS | · | 1.6 km | MPC · JPL |
| 497131 | 2004 PX_{80} | — | August 10, 2004 | Socorro | LINEAR | · | 1.4 km | MPC · JPL |
| 497132 | 2004 PS_{95} | — | August 13, 2004 | Reedy Creek | J. Broughton | · | 1.3 km | MPC · JPL |
| 497133 | 2004 PV_{97} | — | August 14, 2004 | Reedy Creek | J. Broughton | · | 620 m | MPC · JPL |
| 497134 | 2004 QZ_{12} | — | August 21, 2004 | Siding Spring | SSS | · | 1.5 km | MPC · JPL |
| 497135 | 2004 QD_{20} | — | August 26, 2004 | Socorro | LINEAR | APO +1km | 860 m | MPC · JPL |
| 497136 | 2004 QO_{26} | — | August 23, 2004 | Siding Spring | SSS | · | 1.5 km | MPC · JPL |
| 497137 | 2004 RW | — | September 3, 2004 | Las Cruces | Dixon, D. S. | · | 1.1 km | MPC · JPL |
| 497138 | 2004 RE_{10} | — | September 7, 2004 | Socorro | LINEAR | · | 1.3 km | MPC · JPL |
| 497139 | 2004 RC_{16} | — | September 7, 2004 | Kitt Peak | Spacewatch | · | 1.2 km | MPC · JPL |
| 497140 | 2004 RQ_{19} | — | September 7, 2004 | Kitt Peak | Spacewatch | · | 1.0 km | MPC · JPL |
| 497141 | 2004 RQ_{20} | — | September 7, 2004 | Kitt Peak | Spacewatch | · | 1.3 km | MPC · JPL |
| 497142 | 2004 RH_{38} | — | September 7, 2004 | Socorro | LINEAR | BAR | 930 m | MPC · JPL |
| 497143 | 2004 RG_{39} | — | September 7, 2004 | Socorro | LINEAR | · | 1.7 km | MPC · JPL |
| 497144 | 2004 RC_{60} | — | September 8, 2004 | Socorro | LINEAR | · | 1.6 km | MPC · JPL |
| 497145 | 2004 RG_{71} | — | September 8, 2004 | Socorro | LINEAR | · | 1.6 km | MPC · JPL |
| 497146 | 2004 RN_{89} | — | September 8, 2004 | Socorro | LINEAR | JUN | 850 m | MPC · JPL |
| 497147 | 2004 RY_{89} | — | August 27, 2004 | Catalina | CSS | · | 1.3 km | MPC · JPL |
| 497148 | 2004 RO_{95} | — | August 21, 2004 | Catalina | CSS | · | 490 m | MPC · JPL |
| 497149 | 2004 RW_{111} | — | September 12, 2004 | Kitt Peak | Spacewatch | H | 390 m | MPC · JPL |
| 497150 | 2004 RF_{140} | — | August 23, 2004 | Kitt Peak | Spacewatch | EUN | 1.0 km | MPC · JPL |
| 497151 | 2004 RM_{148} | — | September 8, 2004 | Socorro | LINEAR | (1547) | 1.3 km | MPC · JPL |
| 497152 | 2004 RW_{163} | — | September 10, 2004 | Socorro | LINEAR | (194) | 1.7 km | MPC · JPL |
| 497153 | 2004 RC_{170} | — | September 8, 2004 | Palomar | NEAT | · | 780 m | MPC · JPL |
| 497154 | 2004 RJ_{185} | — | September 10, 2004 | Socorro | LINEAR | · | 620 m | MPC · JPL |
| 497155 | 2004 RW_{191} | — | August 27, 2004 | Catalina | CSS | · | 1.4 km | MPC · JPL |
| 497156 | 2004 RG_{194} | — | September 10, 2004 | Socorro | LINEAR | · | 1.3 km | MPC · JPL |
| 497157 | 2004 RE_{197} | — | September 10, 2004 | Socorro | LINEAR | JUN | 860 m | MPC · JPL |
| 497158 | 2004 RU_{197} | — | September 10, 2004 | Socorro | LINEAR | · | 1.1 km | MPC · JPL |
| 497159 | 2004 RF_{198} | — | September 10, 2004 | Socorro | LINEAR | · | 1.7 km | MPC · JPL |
| 497160 | 2004 RT_{208} | — | September 11, 2004 | Socorro | LINEAR | (1547) | 1.7 km | MPC · JPL |
| 497161 | 2004 RW_{225} | — | September 9, 2004 | Socorro | LINEAR | · | 560 m | MPC · JPL |
| 497162 | 2004 RB_{298} | — | September 11, 2004 | Kitt Peak | Spacewatch | · | 1.4 km | MPC · JPL |
| 497163 | 2004 RH_{316} | — | August 20, 2004 | Catalina | CSS | · | 1.1 km | MPC · JPL |
| 497164 | 2004 RR_{324} | — | September 13, 2004 | Socorro | LINEAR | · | 1.0 km | MPC · JPL |
| 497165 | 2004 RG_{333} | — | September 15, 2004 | Anderson Mesa | LONEOS | · | 2.1 km | MPC · JPL |
| 497166 | 2004 RK_{336} | — | September 15, 2004 | Kitt Peak | Spacewatch | · | 630 m | MPC · JPL |
| 497167 | 2004 RG_{346} | — | September 8, 2004 | Socorro | LINEAR | · | 1.3 km | MPC · JPL |
| 497168 | 2004 SG_{5} | — | August 18, 2004 | Siding Spring | SSS | · | 630 m | MPC · JPL |
| 497169 | 2004 SO_{19} | — | September 18, 2004 | Socorro | LINEAR | · | 1.5 km | MPC · JPL |
| 497170 | 2004 SJ_{37} | — | September 17, 2004 | Kitt Peak | Spacewatch | · | 1.3 km | MPC · JPL |
| 497171 | 2004 TX_{1} | — | September 18, 2004 | Socorro | LINEAR | · | 1.7 km | MPC · JPL |
| 497172 | 2004 TF_{9} | — | October 5, 2004 | Kitt Peak | Spacewatch | H | 550 m | MPC · JPL |
| 497173 | 2004 TA_{10} | — | October 7, 2004 | Kitt Peak | Spacewatch | H | 440 m | MPC · JPL |
| 497174 | 2004 TK_{10} | — | October 8, 2004 | Kitt Peak | Spacewatch | APO | 180 m | MPC · JPL |
| 497175 | 2004 TB_{11} | — | September 15, 2004 | Socorro | LINEAR | H | 630 m | MPC · JPL |
| 497176 | 2004 TQ_{13} | — | October 9, 2004 | Socorro | LINEAR | AMO | 740 m | MPC · JPL |
| 497177 | 2004 TA_{34} | — | October 4, 2004 | Kitt Peak | Spacewatch | · | 1.2 km | MPC · JPL |
| 497178 | 2004 TY_{35} | — | October 4, 2004 | Kitt Peak | Spacewatch | · | 480 m | MPC · JPL |
| 497179 | 2004 TG_{37} | — | October 4, 2004 | Kitt Peak | Spacewatch | · | 460 m | MPC · JPL |
| 497180 | 2004 TJ_{37} | — | September 7, 2004 | Kitt Peak | Spacewatch | · | 1.3 km | MPC · JPL |
| 497181 | 2004 TX_{41} | — | October 4, 2004 | Kitt Peak | Spacewatch | · | 1.4 km | MPC · JPL |
| 497182 | 2004 TS_{55} | — | October 4, 2004 | Kitt Peak | Spacewatch | ADE | 2.0 km | MPC · JPL |
| 497183 | 2004 TW_{63} | — | October 5, 2004 | Kitt Peak | Spacewatch | · | 520 m | MPC · JPL |
| 497184 | 2004 TA_{65} | — | October 5, 2004 | Kitt Peak | Spacewatch | · | 1.1 km | MPC · JPL |
| 497185 | 2004 TX_{69} | — | October 5, 2004 | Anderson Mesa | LONEOS | · | 1.3 km | MPC · JPL |
| 497186 | 2004 TF_{71} | — | October 6, 2004 | Kitt Peak | Spacewatch | · | 510 m | MPC · JPL |
| 497187 | 2004 TU_{71} | — | September 10, 2004 | Kitt Peak | Spacewatch | · | 1.4 km | MPC · JPL |
| 497188 | 2004 TA_{93} | — | September 17, 2004 | Socorro | LINEAR | · | 2.0 km | MPC · JPL |
| 497189 | 2004 TJ_{113} | — | October 7, 2004 | Kitt Peak | Spacewatch | · | 1.4 km | MPC · JPL |
| 497190 | 2004 TQ_{135} | — | October 8, 2004 | Anderson Mesa | LONEOS | · | 1.4 km | MPC · JPL |
| 497191 | 2004 TT_{150} | — | September 10, 2004 | Kitt Peak | Spacewatch | · | 1.4 km | MPC · JPL |
| 497192 | 2004 TU_{150} | — | October 6, 2004 | Kitt Peak | Spacewatch | · | 1.3 km | MPC · JPL |
| 497193 | 2004 TP_{159} | — | October 6, 2004 | Kitt Peak | Spacewatch | · | 510 m | MPC · JPL |
| 497194 | 2004 TS_{161} | — | October 6, 2004 | Kitt Peak | Spacewatch | · | 1.1 km | MPC · JPL |
| 497195 | 2004 TQ_{183} | — | October 7, 2004 | Kitt Peak | Spacewatch | · | 1.1 km | MPC · JPL |
| 497196 | 2004 TJ_{184} | — | September 10, 2004 | Kitt Peak | Spacewatch | · | 640 m | MPC · JPL |
| 497197 | 2004 TT_{185} | — | October 7, 2004 | Kitt Peak | Spacewatch | · | 1.5 km | MPC · JPL |
| 497198 | 2004 TU_{186} | — | October 7, 2004 | Kitt Peak | Spacewatch | · | 1.4 km | MPC · JPL |
| 497199 | 2004 TS_{217} | — | September 24, 2004 | Kitt Peak | Spacewatch | · | 1.4 km | MPC · JPL |
| 497200 | 2004 TH_{219} | — | September 17, 2004 | Kitt Peak | Spacewatch | · | 1.5 km | MPC · JPL |

== 497201–497300 ==
back to top

| Designation | | | Discovery | | | Properties | | Ref |
| Permanent | Provisional | Named after | Date | Site | Discoverer(s) | Category | Diam. | Ref |
|---|---|---|---|---|---|---|---|---|
| 497201 | 2004 TA_{259} | — | October 9, 2004 | Kitt Peak | Spacewatch | · | 1.2 km | MPC · JPL |
| 497202 | 2004 TK_{274} | — | October 9, 2004 | Kitt Peak | Spacewatch | · | 1.4 km | MPC · JPL |
| 497203 | 2004 TF_{276} | — | October 9, 2004 | Kitt Peak | Spacewatch | · | 1.4 km | MPC · JPL |
| 497204 | 2004 TN_{278} | — | October 9, 2004 | Kitt Peak | Spacewatch | MIS | 1.9 km | MPC · JPL |
| 497205 | 2004 TD_{328} | — | October 7, 2004 | Socorro | LINEAR | · | 630 m | MPC · JPL |
| 497206 | 2004 UJ_{7} | — | October 10, 2004 | Socorro | LINEAR | ADE | 2.0 km | MPC · JPL |
| 497207 | 2004 UP_{9} | — | October 7, 2004 | Socorro | LINEAR | · | 1.2 km | MPC · JPL |
| 497208 | 2004 VQ_{26} | — | November 4, 2004 | Catalina | CSS | · | 1.6 km | MPC · JPL |
| 497209 | 2004 VY_{36} | — | October 10, 2004 | Kitt Peak | Spacewatch | · | 1.7 km | MPC · JPL |
| 497210 | 2004 VH_{38} | — | October 14, 2004 | Kitt Peak | Spacewatch | · | 1.3 km | MPC · JPL |
| 497211 | 2004 VG_{68} | — | October 15, 2004 | Kitt Peak | Spacewatch | · | 1.8 km | MPC · JPL |
| 497212 | 2004 VH_{68} | — | November 10, 2004 | Kitt Peak | Spacewatch | AGN | 890 m | MPC · JPL |
| 497213 | 2004 VB_{77} | — | November 12, 2004 | Catalina | CSS | · | 1.4 km | MPC · JPL |
| 497214 | 2004 VZ_{77} | — | November 13, 2004 | Catalina | CSS | · | 2.0 km | MPC · JPL |
| 497215 | 2004 VY_{90} | — | November 3, 2004 | Palomar | NEAT | · | 1.6 km | MPC · JPL |
| 497216 | 2004 XF_{24} | — | November 4, 2004 | Catalina | CSS | JUN | 1.1 km | MPC · JPL |
| 497217 | 2004 XK_{98} | — | December 11, 2004 | Kitt Peak | Spacewatch | · | 590 m | MPC · JPL |
| 497218 | 2004 XX_{102} | — | December 14, 2004 | Catalina | CSS | H | 590 m | MPC · JPL |
| 497219 | 2004 XG_{131} | — | November 10, 2004 | Kitt Peak | Spacewatch | · | 1.8 km | MPC · JPL |
| 497220 | 2004 XD_{134} | — | November 3, 2004 | Catalina | CSS | · | 2.1 km | MPC · JPL |
| 497221 | 2004 XE_{137} | — | December 15, 2004 | Socorro | LINEAR | JUN | 1.2 km | MPC · JPL |
| 497222 | 2004 XA_{143} | — | December 9, 2004 | Kitt Peak | Spacewatch | · | 1.6 km | MPC · JPL |
| 497223 | 2004 YV_{18} | — | December 18, 2004 | Mount Lemmon | Mount Lemmon Survey | · | 1.8 km | MPC · JPL |
| 497224 | 2005 AN_{15} | — | January 6, 2005 | Socorro | LINEAR | PHO | 700 m | MPC · JPL |
| 497225 | 2005 AD_{16} | — | January 6, 2005 | Socorro | LINEAR | · | 2.2 km | MPC · JPL |
| 497226 | 2005 AA_{23} | — | December 15, 2004 | Socorro | LINEAR | · | 2.1 km | MPC · JPL |
| 497227 | 2005 AN_{27} | — | January 13, 2005 | Socorro | LINEAR | H | 690 m | MPC · JPL |
| 497228 | 2005 AV_{59} | — | January 7, 2005 | Kitt Peak | Spacewatch | · | 540 m | MPC · JPL |
| 497229 | 2005 AU_{65} | — | December 20, 2004 | Mount Lemmon | Mount Lemmon Survey | AEO | 870 m | MPC · JPL |
| 497230 | 2005 CU_{25} | — | February 4, 2005 | Mount Lemmon | Mount Lemmon Survey | AMO +1km | 840 m | MPC · JPL |
| 497231 | 2005 CY_{30} | — | February 1, 2005 | Kitt Peak | Spacewatch | · | 800 m | MPC · JPL |
| 497232 | 2005 EF | — | March 1, 2005 | Catalina | CSS | AMO · APO | 250 m | MPC · JPL |
| 497233 | 2005 EN_{15} | — | March 3, 2005 | Kitt Peak | Spacewatch | V | 560 m | MPC · JPL |
| 497234 | 2005 ES_{42} | — | March 3, 2005 | Kitt Peak | Spacewatch | NYS | 960 m | MPC · JPL |
| 497235 | 2005 EO_{43} | — | February 3, 2005 | Socorro | LINEAR | · | 880 m | MPC · JPL |
| 497236 | 2005 EJ_{94} | — | March 9, 2005 | Mount Lemmon | Mount Lemmon Survey | AMO | 530 m | MPC · JPL |
| 497237 | 2005 EN_{98} | — | March 3, 2005 | Catalina | CSS | · | 850 m | MPC · JPL |
| 497238 | 2005 EH_{114} | — | March 4, 2005 | Mount Lemmon | Mount Lemmon Survey | · | 720 m | MPC · JPL |
| 497239 | 2005 EY_{165} | — | March 11, 2005 | Kitt Peak | Spacewatch | V | 510 m | MPC · JPL |
| 497240 | 2005 EP_{174} | — | March 8, 2005 | Kitt Peak | Spacewatch | · | 3.0 km | MPC · JPL |
| 497241 | 2005 EN_{204} | — | March 11, 2005 | Mount Lemmon | Mount Lemmon Survey | V | 550 m | MPC · JPL |
| 497242 | 2005 EA_{237} | — | March 11, 2005 | Kitt Peak | Spacewatch | · | 2.6 km | MPC · JPL |
| 497243 | 2005 EO_{279} | — | February 14, 2005 | Catalina | CSS | · | 1.8 km | MPC · JPL |
| 497244 | 2005 EW_{327} | — | March 3, 2005 | Kitt Peak | Spacewatch | H | 440 m | MPC · JPL |
| 497245 | 2005 FH | — | March 16, 2005 | Catalina | CSS | T_{j} (2.82) · APO +1km | 1.1 km | MPC · JPL |
| 497246 | 2005 GL_{19} | — | April 2, 2005 | Mount Lemmon | Mount Lemmon Survey | EOS | 1.7 km | MPC · JPL |
| 497247 | 2005 GA_{25} | — | April 2, 2005 | Mount Lemmon | Mount Lemmon Survey | · | 940 m | MPC · JPL |
| 497248 | 2005 GW_{55} | — | March 11, 2005 | Mount Lemmon | Mount Lemmon Survey | NYS | 830 m | MPC · JPL |
| 497249 | 2005 GO_{57} | — | March 16, 2005 | Mount Lemmon | Mount Lemmon Survey | · | 2.1 km | MPC · JPL |
| 497250 | 2005 GP_{105} | — | April 10, 2005 | Kitt Peak | Spacewatch | NYS | 890 m | MPC · JPL |
| 497251 | 2005 GQ_{135} | — | April 10, 2005 | Kitt Peak | Spacewatch | · | 2.9 km | MPC · JPL |
| 497252 | 2005 GO_{160} | — | April 12, 2005 | Kitt Peak | Spacewatch | · | 1.1 km | MPC · JPL |
| 497253 | 2005 GB_{180} | — | April 7, 2005 | Anderson Mesa | LONEOS | EUP | 3.9 km | MPC · JPL |
| 497254 | 2005 GS_{201} | — | April 4, 2005 | Mount Lemmon | Mount Lemmon Survey | EOS | 1.5 km | MPC · JPL |
| 497255 | 2005 GU_{201} | — | April 4, 2005 | Mount Lemmon | Mount Lemmon Survey | · | 1.0 km | MPC · JPL |
| 497256 | 2005 GZ_{212} | — | April 9, 2005 | Calvin-Rehoboth | Calvin College | · | 2.1 km | MPC · JPL |
| 497257 | 2005 JY | — | March 12, 2005 | Mount Lemmon | Mount Lemmon Survey | T_{j} (2.91) | 3.1 km | MPC · JPL |
| 497258 | 2005 JO_{7} | — | April 2, 2005 | Mount Lemmon | Mount Lemmon Survey | · | 1.3 km | MPC · JPL |
| 497259 | 2005 JM_{16} | — | March 10, 2005 | Mount Lemmon | Mount Lemmon Survey | · | 1.8 km | MPC · JPL |
| 497260 | 2005 JY_{36} | — | May 4, 2005 | Kitt Peak | Spacewatch | · | 3.2 km | MPC · JPL |
| 497261 | 2005 JC_{58} | — | May 7, 2005 | Mount Lemmon | Mount Lemmon Survey | · | 3.6 km | MPC · JPL |
| 497262 | 2005 JA_{61} | — | May 8, 2005 | Kitt Peak | Spacewatch | EOS | 1.8 km | MPC · JPL |
| 497263 | 2005 JS_{97} | — | May 8, 2005 | Kitt Peak | Spacewatch | · | 2.7 km | MPC · JPL |
| 497264 | 2005 JF_{106} | — | May 3, 2005 | Kitt Peak | Spacewatch | MAS | 630 m | MPC · JPL |
| 497265 | 2005 JK_{120} | — | May 10, 2005 | Kitt Peak | Spacewatch | · | 2.5 km | MPC · JPL |
| 497266 | 2005 JB_{155} | — | May 4, 2005 | Mount Lemmon | Mount Lemmon Survey | · | 1.0 km | MPC · JPL |
| 497267 | 2005 JX_{172} | — | May 10, 2005 | Cerro Tololo | M. W. Buie | · | 880 m | MPC · JPL |
| 497268 | 2005 JW_{174} | — | May 11, 2005 | Cerro Tololo | M. W. Buie | · | 2.7 km | MPC · JPL |
| 497269 | 2005 JW_{185} | — | May 4, 2005 | Kitt Peak | Spacewatch | · | 1.6 km | MPC · JPL |
| 497270 | 2005 MK_{45} | — | June 27, 2005 | Kitt Peak | Spacewatch | · | 4.0 km | MPC · JPL |
| 497271 | 2005 NO_{9} | — | July 1, 2005 | Kitt Peak | Spacewatch | · | 3.0 km | MPC · JPL |
| 497272 | 2005 NR_{29} | — | July 3, 2005 | Mount Lemmon | Mount Lemmon Survey | · | 1.3 km | MPC · JPL |
| 497273 | 2005 NB_{33} | — | July 5, 2005 | Kitt Peak | Spacewatch | · | 1.0 km | MPC · JPL |
| 497274 | 2005 NS_{52} | — | July 10, 2005 | Kitt Peak | Spacewatch | · | 2.6 km | MPC · JPL |
| 497275 | 2005 NX_{109} | — | July 7, 2005 | Mauna Kea | Veillet, C. | · | 3.1 km | MPC · JPL |
| 497276 | 2005 OU_{17} | — | July 30, 2005 | Palomar | NEAT | · | 3.3 km | MPC · JPL |
| 497277 | 2005 QC_{42} | — | August 26, 2005 | Anderson Mesa | LONEOS | · | 990 m | MPC · JPL |
| 497278 | 2005 QH_{58} | — | August 25, 2005 | Palomar | NEAT | · | 1.0 km | MPC · JPL |
| 497279 | 2005 QS_{116} | — | August 28, 2005 | Kitt Peak | Spacewatch | · | 1.2 km | MPC · JPL |
| 497280 | 2005 QZ_{125} | — | August 28, 2005 | Kitt Peak | Spacewatch | · | 1.1 km | MPC · JPL |
| 497281 | 2005 QS_{126} | — | August 28, 2005 | Kitt Peak | Spacewatch | · | 620 m | MPC · JPL |
| 497282 | 2005 QN_{161} | — | August 28, 2005 | Siding Spring | SSS | · | 1.1 km | MPC · JPL |
| 497283 | 2005 QS_{189} | — | August 29, 2005 | Kitt Peak | Spacewatch | · | 2.6 km | MPC · JPL |
| 497284 | 2005 SO | — | September 22, 2005 | Uccle | T. Pauwels | · | 870 m | MPC · JPL |
| 497285 | 2005 SX_{11} | — | September 23, 2005 | Kitt Peak | Spacewatch | · | 1.3 km | MPC · JPL |
| 497286 | 2005 SJ_{21} | — | September 27, 2005 | Kitt Peak | Spacewatch | (5) | 920 m | MPC · JPL |
| 497287 | 2005 SH_{55} | — | September 25, 2005 | Kitt Peak | Spacewatch | · | 710 m | MPC · JPL |
| 497288 | 2005 SE_{64} | — | September 26, 2005 | Kitt Peak | Spacewatch | · | 590 m | MPC · JPL |
| 497289 | 2005 SW_{76} | — | September 24, 2005 | Kitt Peak | Spacewatch | · | 590 m | MPC · JPL |
| 497290 | 2005 SS_{84} | — | September 24, 2005 | Kitt Peak | Spacewatch | · | 920 m | MPC · JPL |
| 497291 | 2005 SB_{86} | — | September 24, 2005 | Kitt Peak | Spacewatch | · | 970 m | MPC · JPL |
| 497292 | 2005 ST_{88} | — | September 24, 2005 | Kitt Peak | Spacewatch | · | 770 m | MPC · JPL |
| 497293 | 2005 SD_{98} | — | September 25, 2005 | Kitt Peak | Spacewatch | · | 840 m | MPC · JPL |
| 497294 | 2005 SK_{110} | — | September 26, 2005 | Kitt Peak | Spacewatch | · | 790 m | MPC · JPL |
| 497295 | 2005 SR_{111} | — | September 26, 2005 | Kitt Peak | Spacewatch | · | 820 m | MPC · JPL |
| 497296 | 2005 SS_{181} | — | September 29, 2005 | Kitt Peak | Spacewatch | · | 840 m | MPC · JPL |
| 497297 | 2005 SP_{230} | — | September 30, 2005 | Mount Lemmon | Mount Lemmon Survey | · | 750 m | MPC · JPL |
| 497298 | 2005 SJ_{231} | — | September 30, 2005 | Mount Lemmon | Mount Lemmon Survey | · | 870 m | MPC · JPL |
| 497299 | 2005 SF_{233} | — | September 30, 2005 | Mount Lemmon | Mount Lemmon Survey | (5) | 770 m | MPC · JPL |
| 497300 | 2005 SL_{234} | — | September 29, 2005 | Mount Lemmon | Mount Lemmon Survey | · | 650 m | MPC · JPL |

== 497301–497400 ==
back to top

| Designation | | | Discovery | | | Properties | | Ref |
| Permanent | Provisional | Named after | Date | Site | Discoverer(s) | Category | Diam. | Ref |
|---|---|---|---|---|---|---|---|---|
| 497301 | 2005 SO_{239} | — | September 3, 2005 | Catalina | CSS | LUT | 4.9 km | MPC · JPL |
| 497302 | 2005 SA_{246} | — | September 30, 2005 | Mount Lemmon | Mount Lemmon Survey | · | 590 m | MPC · JPL |
| 497303 | 2005 SD_{269} | — | September 25, 2005 | Kitt Peak | Spacewatch | (5) | 930 m | MPC · JPL |
| 497304 | 2005 ST_{269} | — | September 29, 2005 | Kitt Peak | Spacewatch | · | 480 m | MPC · JPL |
| 497305 | 2005 SL_{273} | — | September 27, 2005 | Kitt Peak | Spacewatch | BRG | 1.1 km | MPC · JPL |
| 497306 | 2005 SW_{288} | — | September 27, 2005 | Apache Point | A. C. Becker | · | 1.4 km | MPC · JPL |
| 497307 | 2005 SP_{291} | — | September 25, 2005 | Kitt Peak | Spacewatch | · | 1.1 km | MPC · JPL |
| 497308 | 2005 TL_{4} | — | October 1, 2005 | Mount Lemmon | Mount Lemmon Survey | · | 790 m | MPC · JPL |
| 497309 | 2005 TW_{42} | — | October 4, 2005 | Mount Lemmon | Mount Lemmon Survey | · | 690 m | MPC · JPL |
| 497310 | 2005 TO_{58} | — | October 1, 2005 | Mount Lemmon | Mount Lemmon Survey | (5) | 840 m | MPC · JPL |
| 497311 | 2005 TN_{62} | — | October 4, 2005 | Mount Lemmon | Mount Lemmon Survey | · | 480 m | MPC · JPL |
| 497312 | 2005 TB_{66} | — | October 3, 2005 | Kitt Peak | Spacewatch | · | 730 m | MPC · JPL |
| 497313 | 2005 TY_{87} | — | September 29, 2005 | Mount Lemmon | Mount Lemmon Survey | · | 540 m | MPC · JPL |
| 497314 | 2005 TH_{97} | — | October 6, 2005 | Mount Lemmon | Mount Lemmon Survey | · | 770 m | MPC · JPL |
| 497315 | 2005 TO_{99} | — | October 7, 2005 | Kitt Peak | Spacewatch | · | 780 m | MPC · JPL |
| 497316 | 2005 TK_{102} | — | October 7, 2005 | Mount Lemmon | Mount Lemmon Survey | EUN | 860 m | MPC · JPL |
| 497317 | 2005 TO_{103} | — | September 23, 2005 | Kitt Peak | Spacewatch | · | 810 m | MPC · JPL |
| 497318 | 2005 TA_{115} | — | September 27, 2005 | Kitt Peak | Spacewatch | · | 930 m | MPC · JPL |
| 497319 | 2005 TY_{115} | — | October 7, 2005 | Kitt Peak | Spacewatch | · | 590 m | MPC · JPL |
| 497320 | 2005 TX_{116} | — | October 7, 2005 | Kitt Peak | Spacewatch | (5) | 730 m | MPC · JPL |
| 497321 | 2005 TA_{120} | — | October 7, 2005 | Kitt Peak | Spacewatch | · | 980 m | MPC · JPL |
| 497322 | 2005 TK_{123} | — | October 7, 2005 | Kitt Peak | Spacewatch | · | 860 m | MPC · JPL |
| 497323 | 2005 TU_{125} | — | October 7, 2005 | Kitt Peak | Spacewatch | · | 680 m | MPC · JPL |
| 497324 | 2005 TH_{130} | — | October 7, 2005 | Kitt Peak | Spacewatch | (5) | 780 m | MPC · JPL |
| 497325 | 2005 TU_{145} | — | October 8, 2005 | Kitt Peak | Spacewatch | · | 670 m | MPC · JPL |
| 497326 | 2005 TD_{149} | — | September 29, 2005 | Kitt Peak | Spacewatch | · | 710 m | MPC · JPL |
| 497327 | 2005 TW_{156} | — | October 9, 2005 | Kitt Peak | Spacewatch | · | 740 m | MPC · JPL |
| 497328 | 2005 TR_{157} | — | September 29, 2005 | Kitt Peak | Spacewatch | · | 800 m | MPC · JPL |
| 497329 | 2005 TZ_{164} | — | October 2, 2005 | Mount Lemmon | Mount Lemmon Survey | (5) | 810 m | MPC · JPL |
| 497330 | 2005 TW_{168} | — | October 9, 2005 | Kitt Peak | Spacewatch | KON | 1.8 km | MPC · JPL |
| 497331 | 2005 TE_{182} | — | October 3, 2005 | Palomar | NEAT | HNS | 1.2 km | MPC · JPL |
| 497332 | 2005 TV_{196} | — | October 1, 2005 | Kitt Peak | Spacewatch | · | 770 m | MPC · JPL |
| 497333 | 2005 UW_{1} | — | October 22, 2005 | Junk Bond | D. Healy | · | 750 m | MPC · JPL |
| 497334 | 2005 UK_{11} | — | October 22, 2005 | Kitt Peak | Spacewatch | (5) | 840 m | MPC · JPL |
| 497335 | 2005 UP_{11} | — | October 22, 2005 | Kitt Peak | Spacewatch | · | 810 m | MPC · JPL |
| 497336 | 2005 UT_{15} | — | October 22, 2005 | Kitt Peak | Spacewatch | · | 740 m | MPC · JPL |
| 497337 | 2005 UT_{23} | — | October 23, 2005 | Kitt Peak | Spacewatch | · | 940 m | MPC · JPL |
| 497338 | 2005 UN_{48} | — | October 22, 2005 | Kitt Peak | Spacewatch | (5) · critical | 660 m | MPC · JPL |
| 497339 | 2005 UN_{70} | — | October 23, 2005 | Catalina | CSS | · | 720 m | MPC · JPL |
| 497340 | 2005 UH_{80} | — | October 25, 2005 | Kitt Peak | Spacewatch | · | 990 m | MPC · JPL |
| 497341 | 2005 UF_{85} | — | October 22, 2005 | Kitt Peak | Spacewatch | (5) | 830 m | MPC · JPL |
| 497342 | 2005 UH_{97} | — | October 22, 2005 | Kitt Peak | Spacewatch | HNS | 900 m | MPC · JPL |
| 497343 | 2005 UX_{97} | — | October 22, 2005 | Kitt Peak | Spacewatch | MIS | 2.3 km | MPC · JPL |
| 497344 | 2005 UY_{104} | — | October 22, 2005 | Kitt Peak | Spacewatch | · | 1.1 km | MPC · JPL |
| 497345 | 2005 UL_{121} | — | October 24, 2005 | Kitt Peak | Spacewatch | (5) | 880 m | MPC · JPL |
| 497346 | 2005 UD_{124} | — | October 24, 2005 | Kitt Peak | Spacewatch | · | 760 m | MPC · JPL |
| 497347 | 2005 UX_{133} | — | October 25, 2005 | Kitt Peak | Spacewatch | · | 600 m | MPC · JPL |
| 497348 | 2005 UV_{166} | — | October 1, 2005 | Mount Lemmon | Mount Lemmon Survey | · | 1 km | MPC · JPL |
| 497349 | 2005 UD_{169} | — | October 24, 2005 | Kitt Peak | Spacewatch | · | 980 m | MPC · JPL |
| 497350 | 2005 UO_{171} | — | October 24, 2005 | Kitt Peak | Spacewatch | · | 810 m | MPC · JPL |
| 497351 | 2005 UA_{178} | — | October 24, 2005 | Kitt Peak | Spacewatch | (5) | 1.5 km | MPC · JPL |
| 497352 | 2005 UC_{180} | — | October 24, 2005 | Kitt Peak | Spacewatch | GAL | 2.0 km | MPC · JPL |
| 497353 | 2005 UH_{183} | — | October 25, 2005 | Kitt Peak | Spacewatch | (5) | 960 m | MPC · JPL |
| 497354 | 2005 UX_{185} | — | October 25, 2005 | Mount Lemmon | Mount Lemmon Survey | · | 930 m | MPC · JPL |
| 497355 | 2005 UJ_{187} | — | October 26, 2005 | Kitt Peak | Spacewatch | · | 800 m | MPC · JPL |
| 497356 | 2005 UB_{192} | — | October 27, 2005 | Mount Lemmon | Mount Lemmon Survey | KON | 2.0 km | MPC · JPL |
| 497357 | 2005 UW_{199} | — | October 25, 2005 | Kitt Peak | Spacewatch | · | 780 m | MPC · JPL |
| 497358 | 2005 UV_{221} | — | October 25, 2005 | Kitt Peak | Spacewatch | · | 900 m | MPC · JPL |
| 497359 | 2005 UJ_{223} | — | October 25, 2005 | Kitt Peak | Spacewatch | · | 920 m | MPC · JPL |
| 497360 | 2005 UF_{225} | — | October 25, 2005 | Kitt Peak | Spacewatch | (5) | 900 m | MPC · JPL |
| 497361 | 2005 UZ_{235} | — | October 25, 2005 | Kitt Peak | Spacewatch | · | 760 m | MPC · JPL |
| 497362 | 2005 UU_{248} | — | October 28, 2005 | Mount Lemmon | Mount Lemmon Survey | · | 820 m | MPC · JPL |
| 497363 | 2005 UW_{256} | — | October 25, 2005 | Kitt Peak | Spacewatch | · | 670 m | MPC · JPL |
| 497364 | 2005 UH_{260} | — | October 25, 2005 | Kitt Peak | Spacewatch | · | 1.3 km | MPC · JPL |
| 497365 | 2005 UY_{260} | — | October 25, 2005 | Mount Lemmon | Mount Lemmon Survey | · | 880 m | MPC · JPL |
| 497366 | 2005 UV_{276} | — | October 24, 2005 | Kitt Peak | Spacewatch | (5) | 800 m | MPC · JPL |
| 497367 | 2005 UN_{281} | — | October 25, 2005 | Mount Lemmon | Mount Lemmon Survey | KON | 1.8 km | MPC · JPL |
| 497368 | 2005 UM_{286} | — | October 26, 2005 | Kitt Peak | Spacewatch | (5) | 1.1 km | MPC · JPL |
| 497369 | 2005 UU_{307} | — | October 27, 2005 | Mount Lemmon | Mount Lemmon Survey | · | 940 m | MPC · JPL |
| 497370 | 2005 UL_{319} | — | October 27, 2005 | Kitt Peak | Spacewatch | · | 880 m | MPC · JPL |
| 497371 | 2005 UV_{319} | — | October 27, 2005 | Kitt Peak | Spacewatch | (5) | 890 m | MPC · JPL |
| 497372 | 2005 UM_{332} | — | October 29, 2005 | Kitt Peak | Spacewatch | (5) | 820 m | MPC · JPL |
| 497373 | 2005 UL_{334} | — | October 29, 2005 | Mount Lemmon | Mount Lemmon Survey | EUN | 970 m | MPC · JPL |
| 497374 | 2005 UW_{337} | — | September 30, 2005 | Mount Lemmon | Mount Lemmon Survey | (5) | 820 m | MPC · JPL |
| 497375 | 2005 UL_{369} | — | October 27, 2005 | Kitt Peak | Spacewatch | · | 910 m | MPC · JPL |
| 497376 | 2005 UJ_{371} | — | October 27, 2005 | Mount Lemmon | Mount Lemmon Survey | · | 780 m | MPC · JPL |
| 497377 | 2005 UT_{414} | — | October 25, 2005 | Kitt Peak | Spacewatch | · | 960 m | MPC · JPL |
| 497378 | 2005 UG_{423} | — | October 28, 2005 | Kitt Peak | Spacewatch | (5) | 620 m | MPC · JPL |
| 497379 | 2005 UW_{425} | — | October 28, 2005 | Kitt Peak | Spacewatch | (5) | 940 m | MPC · JPL |
| 497380 | 2005 UM_{429} | — | October 28, 2005 | Kitt Peak | Spacewatch | (5) · critical | 590 m | MPC · JPL |
| 497381 | 2005 UU_{435} | — | October 29, 2005 | Mount Lemmon | Mount Lemmon Survey | CYB | 3.0 km | MPC · JPL |
| 497382 | 2005 UM_{436} | — | October 9, 2005 | Kitt Peak | Spacewatch | · | 900 m | MPC · JPL |
| 497383 | 2005 UM_{462} | — | October 25, 2005 | Kitt Peak | Spacewatch | THM | 2.0 km | MPC · JPL |
| 497384 | 2005 UW_{472} | — | October 30, 2005 | Mount Lemmon | Mount Lemmon Survey | (5) | 990 m | MPC · JPL |
| 497385 | 2005 UB_{526} | — | October 28, 2005 | Mount Lemmon | Mount Lemmon Survey | · | 1.1 km | MPC · JPL |
| 497386 | 2005 UG_{527} | — | October 30, 2005 | Mount Lemmon | Mount Lemmon Survey | · | 900 m | MPC · JPL |
| 497387 | 2005 VD_{8} | — | November 1, 2005 | Kitt Peak | Spacewatch | · | 930 m | MPC · JPL |
| 497388 | 2005 VS_{9} | — | November 1, 2005 | Kitt Peak | Spacewatch | · | 780 m | MPC · JPL |
| 497389 | 2005 VT_{33} | — | November 2, 2005 | Mount Lemmon | Mount Lemmon Survey | · | 880 m | MPC · JPL |
| 497390 | 2005 VX_{59} | — | November 5, 2005 | Kitt Peak | Spacewatch | · | 790 m | MPC · JPL |
| 497391 | 2005 VA_{81} | — | October 25, 2005 | Mount Lemmon | Mount Lemmon Survey | EUN | 1.1 km | MPC · JPL |
| 497392 | 2005 VR_{89} | — | October 25, 2005 | Kitt Peak | Spacewatch | KON | 1.4 km | MPC · JPL |
| 497393 | 2005 VH_{95} | — | November 6, 2005 | Kitt Peak | Spacewatch | · | 1.1 km | MPC · JPL |
| 497394 | 2005 VA_{103} | — | November 2, 2005 | Catalina | CSS | · | 1.1 km | MPC · JPL |
| 497395 | 2005 VL_{109} | — | November 6, 2005 | Mount Lemmon | Mount Lemmon Survey | · | 930 m | MPC · JPL |
| 497396 | 2005 VP_{114} | — | November 10, 2005 | Campo Imperatore | CINEOS | · | 1.7 km | MPC · JPL |
| 497397 | 2005 VP_{117} | — | November 11, 2005 | Kitt Peak | Spacewatch | (5) | 860 m | MPC · JPL |
| 497398 | 2005 VC_{118} | — | November 14, 2005 | Palomar | NEAT | · | 2.8 km | MPC · JPL |
| 497399 | 2005 VC_{125} | — | November 10, 2005 | Mount Lemmon | Mount Lemmon Survey | EUN | 1.1 km | MPC · JPL |
| 497400 | 2005 VH_{130} | — | September 23, 2005 | Kitt Peak | Spacewatch | (5) | 700 m | MPC · JPL |

== 497401–497500 ==
back to top

| Designation | | | Discovery | | | Properties | | Ref |
| Permanent | Provisional | Named after | Date | Site | Discoverer(s) | Category | Diam. | Ref |
|---|---|---|---|---|---|---|---|---|
| 497401 | 2005 VR_{135} | — | November 10, 2005 | Kitt Peak | Spacewatch | · | 1.5 km | MPC · JPL |
| 497402 | 2005 WJ_{4} | — | November 25, 2005 | Mount Lemmon | Mount Lemmon Survey | · | 2.4 km | MPC · JPL |
| 497403 | 2005 WT_{5} | — | November 21, 2005 | Kitt Peak | Spacewatch | HNS | 1.2 km | MPC · JPL |
| 497404 | 2005 WF_{14} | — | November 3, 2005 | Kitt Peak | Spacewatch | MAR | 880 m | MPC · JPL |
| 497405 | 2005 WF_{17} | — | November 22, 2005 | Kitt Peak | Spacewatch | · | 1.7 km | MPC · JPL |
| 497406 | 2005 WM_{33} | — | November 21, 2005 | Kitt Peak | Spacewatch | · | 950 m | MPC · JPL |
| 497407 | 2005 WG_{34} | — | November 21, 2005 | Catalina | CSS | EUN | 1.1 km | MPC · JPL |
| 497408 | 2005 WY_{35} | — | November 22, 2005 | Kitt Peak | Spacewatch | · | 910 m | MPC · JPL |
| 497409 | 2005 WE_{48} | — | November 25, 2005 | Kitt Peak | Spacewatch | (5) | 930 m | MPC · JPL |
| 497410 | 2005 WE_{49} | — | November 25, 2005 | Kitt Peak | Spacewatch | KON | 1.6 km | MPC · JPL |
| 497411 | 2005 WE_{50} | — | November 25, 2005 | Mount Lemmon | Mount Lemmon Survey | · | 1.0 km | MPC · JPL |
| 497412 | 2005 WL_{63} | — | November 25, 2005 | Mount Lemmon | Mount Lemmon Survey | · | 900 m | MPC · JPL |
| 497413 | 2005 WH_{80} | — | November 25, 2005 | Kitt Peak | Spacewatch | · | 990 m | MPC · JPL |
| 497414 | 2005 WS_{80} | — | November 26, 2005 | Mount Lemmon | Mount Lemmon Survey | · | 1.2 km | MPC · JPL |
| 497415 | 2005 WU_{103} | — | November 28, 2005 | Socorro | LINEAR | (1547) | 1.6 km | MPC · JPL |
| 497416 | 2005 WW_{105} | — | November 29, 2005 | Catalina | CSS | RAF | 950 m | MPC · JPL |
| 497417 | 2005 WG_{114} | — | November 28, 2005 | Kitt Peak | Spacewatch | KON | 2.2 km | MPC · JPL |
| 497418 | 2005 WU_{124} | — | November 25, 2005 | Kitt Peak | Spacewatch | (5) | 1.1 km | MPC · JPL |
| 497419 | 2005 WF_{126} | — | November 25, 2005 | Mount Lemmon | Mount Lemmon Survey | · | 900 m | MPC · JPL |
| 497420 | 2005 WO_{140} | — | November 26, 2005 | Mount Lemmon | Mount Lemmon Survey | · | 660 m | MPC · JPL |
| 497421 | 2005 WT_{160} | — | November 28, 2005 | Kitt Peak | Spacewatch | (5) | 1.1 km | MPC · JPL |
| 497422 | 2005 WB_{166} | — | November 29, 2005 | Socorro | LINEAR | · | 1.2 km | MPC · JPL |
| 497423 | 2005 WV_{186} | — | November 29, 2005 | Kitt Peak | Spacewatch | (5) | 1.1 km | MPC · JPL |
| 497424 | 2005 WK_{188} | — | November 30, 2005 | Kitt Peak | Spacewatch | (5) | 1.1 km | MPC · JPL |
| 497425 | 2005 XK | — | December 1, 2005 | Mount Lemmon | Mount Lemmon Survey | · | 900 m | MPC · JPL |
| 497426 | 2005 XZ_{9} | — | December 1, 2005 | Kitt Peak | Spacewatch | (5) | 850 m | MPC · JPL |
| 497427 | 2005 XR_{12} | — | October 25, 2005 | Mount Lemmon | Mount Lemmon Survey | · | 850 m | MPC · JPL |
| 497428 | 2005 XQ_{28} | — | November 3, 2005 | Socorro | LINEAR | (40134) | 2.5 km | MPC · JPL |
| 497429 | 2005 XB_{29} | — | December 2, 2005 | Socorro | LINEAR | · | 950 m | MPC · JPL |
| 497430 | 2005 XA_{45} | — | December 2, 2005 | Kitt Peak | Spacewatch | critical | 660 m | MPC · JPL |
| 497431 | 2005 XX_{49} | — | December 2, 2005 | Kitt Peak | Spacewatch | · | 960 m | MPC · JPL |
| 497432 | 2005 XH_{52} | — | December 2, 2005 | Kitt Peak | Spacewatch | EUN | 1.4 km | MPC · JPL |
| 497433 | 2005 XC_{59} | — | December 3, 2005 | Kitt Peak | Spacewatch | · | 970 m | MPC · JPL |
| 497434 | 2005 XA_{63} | — | December 5, 2005 | Mount Lemmon | Mount Lemmon Survey | · | 920 m | MPC · JPL |
| 497435 | 2005 XH_{67} | — | October 29, 2005 | Mount Lemmon | Mount Lemmon Survey | · | 1.2 km | MPC · JPL |
| 497436 | 2005 XL_{82} | — | December 10, 2005 | Kitt Peak | Spacewatch | EUN | 960 m | MPC · JPL |
| 497437 | 2005 XD_{90} | — | December 1, 2005 | Kitt Peak | Spacewatch | · | 1.6 km | MPC · JPL |
| 497438 | 2005 XJ_{100} | — | December 1, 2005 | Kitt Peak | M. W. Buie | (5) | 850 m | MPC · JPL |
| 497439 | 2005 YK_{7} | — | December 22, 2005 | Catalina | CSS | · | 1.4 km | MPC · JPL |
| 497440 | 2005 YT_{13} | — | August 25, 1995 | Kitt Peak | Spacewatch | EUN | 1.4 km | MPC · JPL |
| 497441 | 2005 YW_{13} | — | December 22, 2005 | Kitt Peak | Spacewatch | · | 1.5 km | MPC · JPL |
| 497442 | 2005 YQ_{14} | — | November 3, 2005 | Mount Lemmon | Mount Lemmon Survey | · | 1.5 km | MPC · JPL |
| 497443 | 2005 YA_{19} | — | December 7, 2005 | Kitt Peak | Spacewatch | NYS | 810 m | MPC · JPL |
| 497444 | 2005 YW_{20} | — | December 24, 2005 | Kitt Peak | Spacewatch | · | 1.2 km | MPC · JPL |
| 497445 | 2005 YQ_{21} | — | December 24, 2005 | Kitt Peak | Spacewatch | (5) | 1.1 km | MPC · JPL |
| 497446 | 2005 YC_{22} | — | December 24, 2005 | Kitt Peak | Spacewatch | · | 1.2 km | MPC · JPL |
| 497447 | 2005 YH_{22} | — | December 4, 2005 | Mount Lemmon | Mount Lemmon Survey | EUN | 1.2 km | MPC · JPL |
| 497448 | 2005 YL_{22} | — | December 24, 2005 | Kitt Peak | Spacewatch | · | 800 m | MPC · JPL |
| 497449 | 2005 YN_{23} | — | December 24, 2005 | Kitt Peak | Spacewatch | (5) | 920 m | MPC · JPL |
| 497450 | 2005 YM_{32} | — | December 22, 2005 | Kitt Peak | Spacewatch | · | 2.1 km | MPC · JPL |
| 497451 | 2005 YG_{36} | — | December 25, 2005 | Kitt Peak | Spacewatch | · | 2.4 km | MPC · JPL |
| 497452 | 2005 YL_{52} | — | October 27, 2005 | Mount Lemmon | Mount Lemmon Survey | EUN | 1.3 km | MPC · JPL |
| 497453 | 2005 YB_{58} | — | December 24, 2005 | Kitt Peak | Spacewatch | · | 1.4 km | MPC · JPL |
| 497454 | 2005 YN_{59} | — | December 26, 2005 | Mount Lemmon | Mount Lemmon Survey | · | 670 m | MPC · JPL |
| 497455 | 2005 YY_{59} | — | December 22, 2005 | Kitt Peak | Spacewatch | · | 1.0 km | MPC · JPL |
| 497456 | 2005 YO_{62} | — | December 5, 2005 | Mount Lemmon | Mount Lemmon Survey | · | 1.7 km | MPC · JPL |
| 497457 | 2005 YP_{64} | — | December 25, 2005 | Mount Lemmon | Mount Lemmon Survey | (5) | 930 m | MPC · JPL |
| 497458 | 2005 YQ_{80} | — | December 24, 2005 | Kitt Peak | Spacewatch | · | 1.5 km | MPC · JPL |
| 497459 | 2005 YR_{81} | — | December 24, 2005 | Kitt Peak | Spacewatch | · | 1.6 km | MPC · JPL |
| 497460 | 2005 YJ_{91} | — | December 26, 2005 | Mount Lemmon | Mount Lemmon Survey | · | 540 m | MPC · JPL |
| 497461 | 2005 YV_{97} | — | December 24, 2005 | Kitt Peak | Spacewatch | · | 1.3 km | MPC · JPL |
| 497462 | 2005 YA_{98} | — | December 24, 2005 | Kitt Peak | Spacewatch | · | 2.2 km | MPC · JPL |
| 497463 | 2005 YB_{101} | — | December 25, 2005 | Kitt Peak | Spacewatch | · | 1.8 km | MPC · JPL |
| 497464 | 2005 YE_{108} | — | December 25, 2005 | Kitt Peak | Spacewatch | · | 590 m | MPC · JPL |
| 497465 | 2005 YR_{130} | — | December 25, 2005 | Kitt Peak | Spacewatch | JUN | 1.1 km | MPC · JPL |
| 497466 | 2005 YT_{137} | — | December 26, 2005 | Kitt Peak | Spacewatch | · | 2.2 km | MPC · JPL |
| 497467 | 2005 YR_{139} | — | December 28, 2005 | Mount Lemmon | Mount Lemmon Survey | · | 1.0 km | MPC · JPL |
| 497468 | 2005 YA_{141} | — | December 28, 2005 | Mount Lemmon | Mount Lemmon Survey | · | 1.5 km | MPC · JPL |
| 497469 | 2005 YD_{145} | — | December 28, 2005 | Mount Lemmon | Mount Lemmon Survey | · | 2.3 km | MPC · JPL |
| 497470 | 2005 YC_{147} | — | December 29, 2005 | Mount Lemmon | Mount Lemmon Survey | · | 2.1 km | MPC · JPL |
| 497471 | 2005 YA_{154} | — | December 29, 2005 | Mount Lemmon | Mount Lemmon Survey | EOS | 1.5 km | MPC · JPL |
| 497472 | 2005 YQ_{163} | — | December 28, 2005 | Kitt Peak | Spacewatch | · | 1.5 km | MPC · JPL |
| 497473 | 2005 YD_{170} | — | December 31, 2005 | Kitt Peak | Spacewatch | (5) | 990 m | MPC · JPL |
| 497474 | 2005 YN_{174} | — | December 29, 2005 | Palomar | NEAT | · | 1.2 km | MPC · JPL |
| 497475 | 2005 YH_{186} | — | December 29, 2005 | Catalina | CSS | GAL | 2.1 km | MPC · JPL |
| 497476 | 2005 YO_{210} | — | December 24, 2005 | Socorro | LINEAR | (5) | 1.3 km | MPC · JPL |
| 497477 | 2005 YW_{238} | — | December 2, 2005 | Mount Lemmon | Mount Lemmon Survey | · | 1.3 km | MPC · JPL |
| 497478 | 2005 YZ_{250} | — | December 28, 2005 | Kitt Peak | Spacewatch | · | 1.5 km | MPC · JPL |
| 497479 | 2005 YM_{251} | — | December 28, 2005 | Kitt Peak | Spacewatch | · | 1.1 km | MPC · JPL |
| 497480 | 2005 YU_{255} | — | December 2, 2005 | Mount Lemmon | Mount Lemmon Survey | · | 1.7 km | MPC · JPL |
| 497481 | 2005 YG_{257} | — | December 30, 2005 | Kitt Peak | Spacewatch | (5) | 1.3 km | MPC · JPL |
| 497482 | 2005 YF_{271} | — | December 28, 2005 | Kitt Peak | Spacewatch | · | 1.4 km | MPC · JPL |
| 497483 | 2005 YE_{277} | — | December 24, 2005 | Kitt Peak | Spacewatch | · | 1.3 km | MPC · JPL |
| 497484 | 2005 YW_{284} | — | December 28, 2005 | Kitt Peak | Spacewatch | · | 1.4 km | MPC · JPL |
| 497485 | 2005 YA_{291} | — | December 27, 2005 | Kitt Peak | Spacewatch | · | 1.6 km | MPC · JPL |
| 497486 | 2006 AA_{6} | — | January 2, 2006 | Socorro | LINEAR | · | 1.8 km | MPC · JPL |
| 497487 | 2006 AT_{14} | — | January 5, 2006 | Mount Lemmon | Mount Lemmon Survey | · | 1.1 km | MPC · JPL |
| 497488 | 2006 AR_{15} | — | October 6, 2005 | Mount Lemmon | Mount Lemmon Survey | · | 1.9 km | MPC · JPL |
| 497489 | 2006 AJ_{19} | — | January 2, 2006 | Socorro | LINEAR | · | 1.5 km | MPC · JPL |
| 497490 | 2006 AH_{23} | — | December 22, 2005 | Kitt Peak | Spacewatch | · | 1.2 km | MPC · JPL |
| 497491 | 2006 AB_{24} | — | December 10, 2005 | Kitt Peak | Spacewatch | · | 1.9 km | MPC · JPL |
| 497492 | 2006 AH_{27} | — | January 5, 2006 | Mount Lemmon | Mount Lemmon Survey | · | 1.2 km | MPC · JPL |
| 497493 | 2006 AO_{32} | — | January 5, 2006 | Kitt Peak | Spacewatch | · | 1.1 km | MPC · JPL |
| 497494 | 2006 AP_{58} | — | December 24, 2005 | Kitt Peak | Spacewatch | (5) | 1.1 km | MPC · JPL |
| 497495 | 2006 AM_{66} | — | January 9, 2006 | Kitt Peak | Spacewatch | · | 2.4 km | MPC · JPL |
| 497496 | 2006 AO_{72} | — | January 6, 2006 | Kitt Peak | Spacewatch | · | 1.6 km | MPC · JPL |
| 497497 | 2006 AV_{76} | — | December 28, 2005 | Kitt Peak | Spacewatch | · | 1.8 km | MPC · JPL |
| 497498 | 2006 AA_{82} | — | January 7, 2006 | Kitt Peak | Spacewatch | · | 1.5 km | MPC · JPL |
| 497499 | 2006 AD_{86} | — | October 25, 2005 | Kitt Peak | Spacewatch | · | 1.7 km | MPC · JPL |
| 497500 | 2006 AQ_{86} | — | December 30, 2005 | Mount Lemmon | Mount Lemmon Survey | · | 2.3 km | MPC · JPL |

== 497501–497600 ==
back to top

| Designation | | | Discovery | | | Properties | | Ref |
| Permanent | Provisional | Named after | Date | Site | Discoverer(s) | Category | Diam. | Ref |
|---|---|---|---|---|---|---|---|---|
| 497501 | 2006 AV_{97} | — | January 5, 2006 | Mount Lemmon | Mount Lemmon Survey | · | 1.8 km | MPC · JPL |
| 497502 | 2006 AP_{105} | — | January 7, 2006 | Mount Lemmon | Mount Lemmon Survey | · | 1.5 km | MPC · JPL |
| 497503 | 2006 BL_{6} | — | January 21, 2006 | Kitt Peak | Spacewatch | · | 1.7 km | MPC · JPL |
| 497504 | 2006 BG_{9} | — | January 22, 2006 | Kitt Peak | Spacewatch | · | 1.4 km | MPC · JPL |
| 497505 | 2006 BR_{21} | — | January 22, 2006 | Mount Lemmon | Mount Lemmon Survey | · | 1.5 km | MPC · JPL |
| 497506 | 2006 BO_{44} | — | January 23, 2006 | Mount Lemmon | Mount Lemmon Survey | JUN | 890 m | MPC · JPL |
| 497507 | 2006 BZ_{48} | — | January 25, 2006 | Kitt Peak | Spacewatch | · | 1.2 km | MPC · JPL |
| 497508 | 2006 BB_{51} | — | January 25, 2006 | Catalina | CSS | · | 1.7 km | MPC · JPL |
| 497509 | 2006 BB_{66} | — | January 23, 2006 | Kitt Peak | Spacewatch | · | 1.5 km | MPC · JPL |
| 497510 | 2006 BQ_{74} | — | January 23, 2006 | Kitt Peak | Spacewatch | (7744) | 1.4 km | MPC · JPL |
| 497511 | 2006 BF_{75} | — | January 23, 2006 | Kitt Peak | Spacewatch | · | 1.7 km | MPC · JPL |
| 497512 | 2006 BU_{75} | — | January 23, 2006 | Kitt Peak | Spacewatch | MRX | 850 m | MPC · JPL |
| 497513 | 2006 BQ_{76} | — | January 23, 2006 | Kitt Peak | Spacewatch | · | 1.6 km | MPC · JPL |
| 497514 | 2006 BR_{77} | — | January 23, 2006 | Mount Lemmon | Mount Lemmon Survey | · | 1.2 km | MPC · JPL |
| 497515 | 2006 BX_{97} | — | January 27, 2006 | Catalina | CSS | · | 1.5 km | MPC · JPL |
| 497516 | 2006 BN_{102} | — | January 23, 2006 | Mount Lemmon | Mount Lemmon Survey | · | 560 m | MPC · JPL |
| 497517 | 2006 BL_{105} | — | December 24, 2005 | Kitt Peak | Spacewatch | · | 1.2 km | MPC · JPL |
| 497518 | 2006 BH_{118} | — | December 25, 2005 | Kitt Peak | Spacewatch | · | 1.9 km | MPC · JPL |
| 497519 | 2006 BJ_{119} | — | December 25, 2005 | Catalina | CSS | JUN | 1.1 km | MPC · JPL |
| 497520 | 2006 BL_{123} | — | January 26, 2006 | Kitt Peak | Spacewatch | · | 1.6 km | MPC · JPL |
| 497521 | 2006 BY_{124} | — | January 26, 2006 | Kitt Peak | Spacewatch | · | 500 m | MPC · JPL |
| 497522 | 2006 BH_{133} | — | January 26, 2006 | Kitt Peak | Spacewatch | · | 1.9 km | MPC · JPL |
| 497523 | 2006 BO_{137} | — | January 28, 2006 | Mount Lemmon | Mount Lemmon Survey | · | 1.2 km | MPC · JPL |
| 497524 | 2006 BW_{143} | — | January 22, 2006 | Anderson Mesa | LONEOS | · | 2.2 km | MPC · JPL |
| 497525 | 2006 BC_{164} | — | January 7, 2006 | Mount Lemmon | Mount Lemmon Survey | · | 510 m | MPC · JPL |
| 497526 | 2006 BL_{165} | — | January 26, 2006 | Mount Lemmon | Mount Lemmon Survey | · | 1.5 km | MPC · JPL |
| 497527 | 2006 BU_{186} | — | January 28, 2006 | Mount Lemmon | Mount Lemmon Survey | · | 2.1 km | MPC · JPL |
| 497528 | 2006 BY_{194} | — | January 30, 2006 | Kitt Peak | Spacewatch | · | 650 m | MPC · JPL |
| 497529 | 2006 BH_{204} | — | January 31, 2006 | Kitt Peak | Spacewatch | · | 800 m | MPC · JPL |
| 497530 | 2006 BM_{212} | — | January 31, 2006 | Kitt Peak | Spacewatch | · | 1.6 km | MPC · JPL |
| 497531 | 2006 BF_{225} | — | January 5, 2006 | Mount Lemmon | Mount Lemmon Survey | GEF | 1.3 km | MPC · JPL |
| 497532 | 2006 BF_{234} | — | December 5, 2005 | Mount Lemmon | Mount Lemmon Survey | · | 1.9 km | MPC · JPL |
| 497533 | 2006 BB_{236} | — | January 23, 2006 | Kitt Peak | Spacewatch | · | 2.0 km | MPC · JPL |
| 497534 | 2006 BR_{237} | — | January 23, 2006 | Kitt Peak | Spacewatch | · | 540 m | MPC · JPL |
| 497535 | 2006 BN_{245} | — | January 21, 2006 | Mount Lemmon | Mount Lemmon Survey | H | 400 m | MPC · JPL |
| 497536 | 2006 CF_{2} | — | January 23, 2006 | Kitt Peak | Spacewatch | · | 1.4 km | MPC · JPL |
| 497537 | 2006 CF_{11} | — | January 4, 2006 | Kitt Peak | Spacewatch | · | 990 m | MPC · JPL |
| 497538 | 2006 CW_{13} | — | January 7, 2006 | Mount Lemmon | Mount Lemmon Survey | · | 1.0 km | MPC · JPL |
| 497539 | 2006 CD_{16} | — | January 23, 2006 | Mount Lemmon | Mount Lemmon Survey | · | 1.9 km | MPC · JPL |
| 497540 | 2006 CU_{17} | — | January 23, 2006 | Kitt Peak | Spacewatch | · | 2.2 km | MPC · JPL |
| 497541 | 2006 CN_{18} | — | February 1, 2006 | Kitt Peak | Spacewatch | · | 610 m | MPC · JPL |
| 497542 | 2006 CY_{22} | — | February 1, 2006 | Kitt Peak | Spacewatch | · | 2.7 km | MPC · JPL |
| 497543 | 2006 CS_{26} | — | January 24, 2006 | Kitt Peak | Spacewatch | HNS | 1.2 km | MPC · JPL |
| 497544 | 2006 CN_{41} | — | February 2, 2006 | Kitt Peak | Spacewatch | ADE | 1.8 km | MPC · JPL |
| 497545 | 2006 CD_{67} | — | February 4, 2006 | Kitt Peak | Spacewatch | · | 1.9 km | MPC · JPL |
| 497546 | 2006 CK_{67} | — | December 17, 2001 | Kitt Peak | Spacewatch | MAS | 730 m | MPC · JPL |
| 497547 | 2006 DQ_{6} | — | February 7, 2006 | Mount Lemmon | Mount Lemmon Survey | H | 490 m | MPC · JPL |
| 497548 | 2006 DP_{28} | — | February 20, 2006 | Kitt Peak | Spacewatch | · | 750 m | MPC · JPL |
| 497549 | 2006 DT_{32} | — | February 20, 2006 | Mount Lemmon | Mount Lemmon Survey | · | 1.4 km | MPC · JPL |
| 497550 | 2006 DJ_{33} | — | February 20, 2006 | Kitt Peak | Spacewatch | · | 1.4 km | MPC · JPL |
| 497551 | 2006 DH_{42} | — | February 20, 2006 | Kitt Peak | Spacewatch | · | 1.1 km | MPC · JPL |
| 497552 | 2006 DW_{47} | — | January 30, 2006 | Kitt Peak | Spacewatch | · | 1.7 km | MPC · JPL |
| 497553 | 2006 DS_{85} | — | February 20, 2006 | Kitt Peak | Spacewatch | PAD | 1.6 km | MPC · JPL |
| 497554 | 2006 DQ_{92} | — | February 24, 2006 | Mount Lemmon | Mount Lemmon Survey | · | 2.0 km | MPC · JPL |
| 497555 | 2006 DQ_{103} | — | February 25, 2006 | Mount Lemmon | Mount Lemmon Survey | · | 450 m | MPC · JPL |
| 497556 | 2006 DQ_{105} | — | February 25, 2006 | Mount Lemmon | Mount Lemmon Survey | · | 1.7 km | MPC · JPL |
| 497557 | 2006 DV_{113} | — | February 27, 2006 | Kitt Peak | Spacewatch | · | 680 m | MPC · JPL |
| 497558 | 2006 DE_{125} | — | January 26, 2006 | Kitt Peak | Spacewatch | · | 1.3 km | MPC · JPL |
| 497559 | 2006 DG_{133} | — | January 28, 2006 | Kitt Peak | Spacewatch | DOR | 2.6 km | MPC · JPL |
| 497560 | 2006 DL_{139} | — | February 25, 2006 | Kitt Peak | Spacewatch | · | 1.5 km | MPC · JPL |
| 497561 | 2006 DK_{142} | — | February 25, 2006 | Kitt Peak | Spacewatch | · | 1.8 km | MPC · JPL |
| 497562 | 2006 DS_{142} | — | February 25, 2006 | Kitt Peak | Spacewatch | · | 570 m | MPC · JPL |
| 497563 | 2006 DM_{143} | — | February 25, 2006 | Mount Lemmon | Mount Lemmon Survey | NEM | 1.9 km | MPC · JPL |
| 497564 | 2006 DJ_{146} | — | February 25, 2006 | Mount Lemmon | Mount Lemmon Survey | · | 2.0 km | MPC · JPL |
| 497565 | 2006 DU_{146} | — | February 25, 2006 | Kitt Peak | Spacewatch | AGN | 1.1 km | MPC · JPL |
| 497566 | 2006 DU_{154} | — | February 25, 2006 | Kitt Peak | Spacewatch | (13314) | 1.6 km | MPC · JPL |
| 497567 | 2006 DD_{163} | — | February 27, 2006 | Mount Lemmon | Mount Lemmon Survey | HOF | 2.5 km | MPC · JPL |
| 497568 | 2006 DO_{171} | — | February 27, 2006 | Kitt Peak | Spacewatch | · | 2.0 km | MPC · JPL |
| 497569 | 2006 DH_{176} | — | February 27, 2006 | Mount Lemmon | Mount Lemmon Survey | H | 440 m | MPC · JPL |
| 497570 | 2006 DK_{176} | — | February 27, 2006 | Mount Lemmon | Mount Lemmon Survey | · | 1.4 km | MPC · JPL |
| 497571 | 2006 DA_{177} | — | January 26, 2006 | Mount Lemmon | Mount Lemmon Survey | · | 1.7 km | MPC · JPL |
| 497572 | 2006 DC_{211} | — | February 24, 2006 | Kitt Peak | Spacewatch | · | 1.6 km | MPC · JPL |
| 497573 | 2006 EC_{49} | — | January 8, 2006 | Mount Lemmon | Mount Lemmon Survey | · | 1.4 km | MPC · JPL |
| 497574 | 2006 EO_{53} | — | March 2, 2006 | Kitt Peak | Spacewatch | · | 1.6 km | MPC · JPL |
| 497575 | 2006 EJ_{73} | — | January 30, 2006 | Kitt Peak | Spacewatch | · | 1.6 km | MPC · JPL |
| 497576 | 2006 FD | — | February 21, 2006 | Catalina | CSS | · | 1.9 km | MPC · JPL |
| 497577 | 2006 FA_{2} | — | February 20, 2006 | Catalina | CSS | H | 480 m | MPC · JPL |
| 497578 | 2006 FA_{47} | — | March 23, 2006 | Catalina | CSS | · | 860 m | MPC · JPL |
| 497579 | 2006 GP_{8} | — | March 24, 2006 | Kitt Peak | Spacewatch | · | 590 m | MPC · JPL |
| 497580 | 2006 GD_{34} | — | April 7, 2006 | Kitt Peak | Spacewatch | AGN | 1.0 km | MPC · JPL |
| 497581 | 2006 GW_{37} | — | April 7, 2006 | Anderson Mesa | LONEOS | PHO | 930 m | MPC · JPL |
| 497582 | 2006 HC_{9} | — | April 19, 2006 | Kitt Peak | Spacewatch | · | 1.7 km | MPC · JPL |
| 497583 | 2006 HG_{20} | — | April 19, 2006 | Mount Lemmon | Mount Lemmon Survey | · | 3.8 km | MPC · JPL |
| 497584 | 2006 HJ_{24} | — | April 20, 2006 | Kitt Peak | Spacewatch | · | 2.4 km | MPC · JPL |
| 497585 | 2006 HB_{25} | — | April 20, 2006 | Kitt Peak | Spacewatch | · | 610 m | MPC · JPL |
| 497586 | 2006 HS_{61} | — | April 24, 2006 | Kitt Peak | Spacewatch | · | 1.7 km | MPC · JPL |
| 497587 | 2006 HX_{63} | — | April 24, 2006 | Kitt Peak | Spacewatch | · | 3.1 km | MPC · JPL |
| 497588 | 2006 HJ_{73} | — | April 25, 2006 | Kitt Peak | Spacewatch | · | 780 m | MPC · JPL |
| 497589 | 2006 HV_{86} | — | April 29, 2006 | Kitt Peak | Spacewatch | · | 1.7 km | MPC · JPL |
| 497590 | 2006 HM_{92} | — | April 21, 2006 | Kitt Peak | Spacewatch | TIR | 2.5 km | MPC · JPL |
| 497591 | 2006 HS_{123} | — | April 24, 2006 | Kitt Peak | Spacewatch | · | 1.5 km | MPC · JPL |
| 497592 | 2006 JB_{52} | — | May 4, 2006 | Kitt Peak | Spacewatch | · | 1.3 km | MPC · JPL |
| 497593 Kejimkujik | 2006 JU_{69} | Kejimkujik | May 1, 2006 | Mauna Kea | P. A. Wiegert | · | 1.6 km | MPC · JPL |
| 497594 | 2006 KZ_{8} | — | May 19, 2006 | Mount Lemmon | Mount Lemmon Survey | · | 540 m | MPC · JPL |
| 497595 | 2006 KP_{20} | — | March 2, 2006 | Kitt Peak | Spacewatch | · | 2.5 km | MPC · JPL |
| 497596 | 2006 KY_{27} | — | May 4, 2006 | Kitt Peak | Spacewatch | · | 1.4 km | MPC · JPL |
| 497597 | 2006 KX_{32} | — | May 20, 2006 | Kitt Peak | Spacewatch | · | 560 m | MPC · JPL |
| 497598 | 2006 KR_{40} | — | May 19, 2006 | Mount Lemmon | Mount Lemmon Survey | H | 480 m | MPC · JPL |
| 497599 | 2006 KL_{52} | — | May 7, 2006 | Mount Lemmon | Mount Lemmon Survey | · | 1.3 km | MPC · JPL |
| 497600 | 2006 KY_{58} | — | May 8, 2006 | Kitt Peak | Spacewatch | · | 480 m | MPC · JPL |

== 497601–497700 ==
back to top

| Designation | | | Discovery | | | Properties | | Ref |
| Permanent | Provisional | Named after | Date | Site | Discoverer(s) | Category | Diam. | Ref |
|---|---|---|---|---|---|---|---|---|
| 497601 | 2006 KD_{90} | — | May 23, 2006 | Kitt Peak | Spacewatch | H | 410 m | MPC · JPL |
| 497602 | 2006 KJ_{102} | — | May 9, 2006 | Mount Lemmon | Mount Lemmon Survey | · | 2.1 km | MPC · JPL |
| 497603 | 2006 KO_{108} | — | May 3, 2006 | Mount Lemmon | Mount Lemmon Survey | NYS | 850 m | MPC · JPL |
| 497604 | 2006 KR_{119} | — | May 31, 2006 | Kitt Peak | Spacewatch | · | 700 m | MPC · JPL |
| 497605 | 2006 MF | — | April 20, 2006 | Kitt Peak | Spacewatch | · | 2.2 km | MPC · JPL |
| 497606 | 2006 MW_{2} | — | April 24, 2006 | Kitt Peak | Spacewatch | EUP | 3.4 km | MPC · JPL |
| 497607 | 2006 OK_{4} | — | July 21, 2006 | Mount Lemmon | Mount Lemmon Survey | · | 2.9 km | MPC · JPL |
| 497608 | 2006 PM_{2} | — | August 12, 2006 | Palomar | NEAT | · | 880 m | MPC · JPL |
| 497609 | 2006 PW_{5} | — | August 12, 2006 | Palomar | NEAT | H | 610 m | MPC · JPL |
| 497610 | 2006 PH_{13} | — | July 26, 1995 | Kitt Peak | Spacewatch | · | 760 m | MPC · JPL |
| 497611 | 2006 PT_{13} | — | August 14, 2006 | Siding Spring | SSS | · | 2.0 km | MPC · JPL |
| 497612 | 2006 QS_{2} | — | August 17, 2006 | Palomar | NEAT | · | 1.6 km | MPC · JPL |
| 497613 | 2006 QK_{4} | — | August 18, 2006 | Kitt Peak | Spacewatch | · | 2.6 km | MPC · JPL |
| 497614 | 2006 QQ_{7} | — | July 21, 2006 | Catalina | CSS | · | 1.2 km | MPC · JPL |
| 497615 | 2006 QT_{8} | — | August 19, 2006 | Kitt Peak | Spacewatch | NYS | 1.0 km | MPC · JPL |
| 497616 | 2006 QF_{13} | — | August 16, 2006 | Siding Spring | SSS | · | 910 m | MPC · JPL |
| 497617 | 2006 QP_{35} | — | August 17, 2006 | Palomar | NEAT | · | 890 m | MPC · JPL |
| 497618 | 2006 QD_{37} | — | August 16, 2006 | Siding Spring | SSS | · | 2.5 km | MPC · JPL |
| 497619 | 2006 QL_{39} | — | August 19, 2006 | Anderson Mesa | LONEOS | T_{j} (2.56) · unusual | 11 km | MPC · JPL |
| 497620 | 2006 QR_{48} | — | August 21, 2006 | Palomar | NEAT | · | 1.1 km | MPC · JPL |
| 497621 | 2006 QY_{49} | — | August 22, 2006 | Palomar | NEAT | NYS | 920 m | MPC · JPL |
| 497622 | 2006 QZ_{55} | — | August 18, 2006 | Kitt Peak | Spacewatch | · | 2.9 km | MPC · JPL |
| 497623 | 2006 QA_{62} | — | August 22, 2006 | Palomar | NEAT | H | 470 m | MPC · JPL |
| 497624 | 2006 QZ_{72} | — | August 21, 2006 | Kitt Peak | Spacewatch | PHO | 780 m | MPC · JPL |
| 497625 | 2006 QT_{81} | — | August 24, 2006 | Palomar | NEAT | · | 1.2 km | MPC · JPL |
| 497626 | 2006 QT_{89} | — | August 29, 2006 | Catalina | CSS | APO | 350 m | MPC · JPL |
| 497627 | 2006 QU_{95} | — | August 16, 2006 | Palomar | NEAT | · | 1.3 km | MPC · JPL |
| 497628 | 2006 QD_{99} | — | August 19, 2006 | Kitt Peak | Spacewatch | · | 3.0 km | MPC · JPL |
| 497629 | 2006 QJ_{105} | — | August 28, 2006 | Catalina | CSS | · | 1.0 km | MPC · JPL |
| 497630 | 2006 QQ_{115} | — | August 27, 2006 | Anderson Mesa | LONEOS | · | 1.3 km | MPC · JPL |
| 497631 | 2006 QZ_{121} | — | August 24, 2006 | Socorro | LINEAR | LIX | 3.7 km | MPC · JPL |
| 497632 | 2006 QM_{162} | — | August 21, 2006 | Kitt Peak | Spacewatch | · | 1.3 km | MPC · JPL |
| 497633 | 2006 QS_{166} | — | August 29, 2006 | Anderson Mesa | LONEOS | · | 2.8 km | MPC · JPL |
| 497634 | 2006 QV_{184} | — | August 21, 2006 | Kitt Peak | Spacewatch | · | 2.6 km | MPC · JPL |
| 497635 | 2006 QZ_{184} | — | August 18, 2006 | Kitt Peak | Spacewatch | THM | 2.5 km | MPC · JPL |
| 497636 | 2006 QP_{185} | — | August 18, 2006 | Kitt Peak | Spacewatch | THM | 2.0 km | MPC · JPL |
| 497637 | 2006 QV_{186} | — | August 18, 2006 | Kitt Peak | Spacewatch | · | 2.0 km | MPC · JPL |
| 497638 | 2006 RA_{5} | — | September 14, 2006 | Catalina | CSS | · | 1.2 km | MPC · JPL |
| 497639 | 2006 RY_{7} | — | September 12, 2006 | Catalina | CSS | MAS | 710 m | MPC · JPL |
| 497640 | 2006 RB_{10} | — | August 28, 2006 | Catalina | CSS | · | 860 m | MPC · JPL |
| 497641 | 2006 RR_{12} | — | August 30, 2006 | Anderson Mesa | LONEOS | · | 3.0 km | MPC · JPL |
| 497642 | 2006 RW_{31} | — | September 15, 2006 | Kitt Peak | Spacewatch | THM | 1.7 km | MPC · JPL |
| 497643 | 2006 RV_{36} | — | August 28, 2006 | Catalina | CSS | NYS | 1.1 km | MPC · JPL |
| 497644 | 2006 RS_{40} | — | September 14, 2006 | Kitt Peak | Spacewatch | · | 2.4 km | MPC · JPL |
| 497645 | 2006 RQ_{41} | — | September 14, 2006 | Kitt Peak | Spacewatch | EOS | 1.5 km | MPC · JPL |
| 497646 | 2006 RW_{41} | — | September 14, 2006 | Kitt Peak | Spacewatch | NYS · fast? | 840 m | MPC · JPL |
| 497647 | 2006 RZ_{44} | — | September 14, 2006 | Kitt Peak | Spacewatch | · | 920 m | MPC · JPL |
| 497648 | 2006 RG_{47} | — | September 14, 2006 | Kitt Peak | Spacewatch | · | 2.1 km | MPC · JPL |
| 497649 | 2006 RL_{51} | — | September 14, 2006 | Kitt Peak | Spacewatch | T_{j} (2.93) | 3.4 km | MPC · JPL |
| 497650 | 2006 RF_{55} | — | September 14, 2006 | Kitt Peak | Spacewatch | · | 790 m | MPC · JPL |
| 497651 | 2006 RW_{55} | — | September 14, 2006 | Kitt Peak | Spacewatch | EOS | 2.0 km | MPC · JPL |
| 497652 | 2006 RS_{56} | — | September 14, 2006 | Kitt Peak | Spacewatch | NYS | 780 m | MPC · JPL |
| 497653 | 2006 RV_{58} | — | July 21, 2006 | Mount Lemmon | Mount Lemmon Survey | THM | 2.1 km | MPC · JPL |
| 497654 | 2006 RO_{61} | — | August 28, 2006 | Kitt Peak | Spacewatch | NYS | 1.1 km | MPC · JPL |
| 497655 | 2006 RQ_{64} | — | September 14, 2006 | Kitt Peak | Spacewatch | EOS | 1.9 km | MPC · JPL |
| 497656 | 2006 RZ_{65} | — | September 14, 2006 | Kitt Peak | Spacewatch | EUP | 3.8 km | MPC · JPL |
| 497657 | 2006 RQ_{67} | — | August 29, 2006 | Kitt Peak | Spacewatch | V | 510 m | MPC · JPL |
| 497658 | 2006 RA_{72} | — | September 15, 2006 | Kitt Peak | Spacewatch | · | 950 m | MPC · JPL |
| 497659 | 2006 RB_{72} | — | September 15, 2006 | Kitt Peak | Spacewatch | MAS | 450 m | MPC · JPL |
| 497660 | 2006 RC_{74} | — | September 15, 2006 | Kitt Peak | Spacewatch | NYS | 840 m | MPC · JPL |
| 497661 | 2006 RW_{75} | — | September 15, 2006 | Kitt Peak | Spacewatch | · | 880 m | MPC · JPL |
| 497662 | 2006 RB_{79} | — | September 15, 2006 | Kitt Peak | Spacewatch | THM | 2.2 km | MPC · JPL |
| 497663 | 2006 RF_{79} | — | September 15, 2006 | Kitt Peak | Spacewatch | MAS | 680 m | MPC · JPL |
| 497664 | 2006 RW_{82} | — | September 15, 2006 | Kitt Peak | Spacewatch | · | 880 m | MPC · JPL |
| 497665 | 2006 RN_{87} | — | September 15, 2006 | Kitt Peak | Spacewatch | MAS | 500 m | MPC · JPL |
| 497666 | 2006 RW_{89} | — | September 15, 2006 | Kitt Peak | Spacewatch | · | 930 m | MPC · JPL |
| 497667 | 2006 RL_{92} | — | September 15, 2006 | Kitt Peak | Spacewatch | · | 940 m | MPC · JPL |
| 497668 | 2006 RL_{94} | — | September 15, 2006 | Kitt Peak | Spacewatch | VER | 2.7 km | MPC · JPL |
| 497669 | 2006 RP_{94} | — | September 15, 2006 | Kitt Peak | Spacewatch | · | 3.0 km | MPC · JPL |
| 497670 | 2006 RS_{96} | — | September 15, 2006 | Kitt Peak | Spacewatch | · | 3.0 km | MPC · JPL |
| 497671 | 2006 RJ_{104} | — | September 11, 2006 | Apache Point | A. C. Becker | EOS | 1.4 km | MPC · JPL |
| 497672 | 2006 RD_{107} | — | September 14, 2006 | Mauna Kea | Masiero, J. | · | 990 m | MPC · JPL |
| 497673 | 2006 RG_{121} | — | September 14, 2006 | Kitt Peak | Spacewatch | · | 690 m | MPC · JPL |
| 497674 | 2006 ST_{1} | — | September 16, 2006 | Kitt Peak | Spacewatch | · | 3.4 km | MPC · JPL |
| 497675 | 2006 SY_{1} | — | September 16, 2006 | Catalina | CSS | · | 3.1 km | MPC · JPL |
| 497676 | 2006 SR_{2} | — | September 16, 2006 | Catalina | CSS | · | 1.2 km | MPC · JPL |
| 497677 | 2006 SQ_{7} | — | September 17, 2006 | Vail-Jarnac | Jarnac | · | 2.3 km | MPC · JPL |
| 497678 | 2006 SF_{11} | — | August 28, 2006 | Kitt Peak | Spacewatch | MAS | 660 m | MPC · JPL |
| 497679 | 2006 SL_{14} | — | August 18, 2006 | Kitt Peak | Spacewatch | · | 3.2 km | MPC · JPL |
| 497680 | 2006 SE_{17} | — | September 17, 2006 | Kitt Peak | Spacewatch | · | 2.2 km | MPC · JPL |
| 497681 | 2006 SK_{26} | — | September 16, 2006 | Catalina | CSS | · | 1.0 km | MPC · JPL |
| 497682 | 2006 SQ_{26} | — | September 16, 2006 | Anderson Mesa | LONEOS | · | 1.2 km | MPC · JPL |
| 497683 | 2006 SN_{32} | — | September 17, 2006 | Kitt Peak | Spacewatch | MAS | 520 m | MPC · JPL |
| 497684 | 2006 SP_{32} | — | September 17, 2006 | Kitt Peak | Spacewatch | HYG | 2.1 km | MPC · JPL |
| 497685 | 2006 SS_{32} | — | August 28, 2006 | Catalina | CSS | EUP | 3.0 km | MPC · JPL |
| 497686 | 2006 SP_{41} | — | September 18, 2006 | Kitt Peak | Spacewatch | (3460) | 1.8 km | MPC · JPL |
| 497687 | 2006 SU_{46} | — | July 25, 2006 | Mount Lemmon | Mount Lemmon Survey | · | 2.5 km | MPC · JPL |
| 497688 | 2006 SD_{54} | — | August 29, 2006 | Anderson Mesa | LONEOS | · | 2.8 km | MPC · JPL |
| 497689 | 2006 SP_{59} | — | September 16, 2006 | Catalina | CSS | · | 3.0 km | MPC · JPL |
| 497690 | 2006 SH_{63} | — | September 19, 2006 | Anderson Mesa | LONEOS | · | 1.0 km | MPC · JPL |
| 497691 | 2006 SO_{66} | — | September 15, 2006 | Kitt Peak | Spacewatch | · | 770 m | MPC · JPL |
| 497692 | 2006 SP_{66} | — | September 19, 2006 | Kitt Peak | Spacewatch | · | 820 m | MPC · JPL |
| 497693 | 2006 SO_{67} | — | September 19, 2006 | Kitt Peak | Spacewatch | HYG | 2.6 km | MPC · JPL |
| 497694 | 2006 SB_{70} | — | September 19, 2006 | Kitt Peak | Spacewatch | THM | 2.1 km | MPC · JPL |
| 497695 | 2006 SR_{70} | — | September 19, 2006 | Kitt Peak | Spacewatch | · | 790 m | MPC · JPL |
| 497696 | 2006 SZ_{71} | — | September 19, 2006 | Kitt Peak | Spacewatch | THM | 2.0 km | MPC · JPL |
| 497697 | 2006 SZ_{72} | — | September 19, 2006 | Kitt Peak | Spacewatch | · | 2.9 km | MPC · JPL |
| 497698 | 2006 SO_{75} | — | September 19, 2006 | Kitt Peak | Spacewatch | EUP | 3.1 km | MPC · JPL |
| 497699 | 2006 SZ_{75} | — | September 19, 2006 | Kitt Peak | Spacewatch | NYS | 870 m | MPC · JPL |
| 497700 MacDougall | 2006 SC_{80} | MacDougall | April 26, 2004 | Mauna Kea | P. A. Wiegert, D. D. Balam | EOS | 1.4 km | MPC · JPL |

== 497701–497800 ==
back to top

| Designation | | | Discovery | | | Properties | | Ref |
| Permanent | Provisional | Named after | Date | Site | Discoverer(s) | Category | Diam. | Ref |
|---|---|---|---|---|---|---|---|---|
| 497701 | 2006 SL_{85} | — | September 18, 2006 | Kitt Peak | Spacewatch | · | 3.0 km | MPC · JPL |
| 497702 | 2006 SS_{85} | — | September 18, 2006 | Kitt Peak | Spacewatch | · | 850 m | MPC · JPL |
| 497703 | 2006 SG_{87} | — | September 18, 2006 | Kitt Peak | Spacewatch | · | 990 m | MPC · JPL |
| 497704 | 2006 SW_{94} | — | September 18, 2006 | Kitt Peak | Spacewatch | · | 900 m | MPC · JPL |
| 497705 | 2006 SF_{97} | — | September 18, 2006 | Kitt Peak | Spacewatch | · | 2.8 km | MPC · JPL |
| 497706 | 2006 SR_{97} | — | September 18, 2006 | Kitt Peak | Spacewatch | MAS | 570 m | MPC · JPL |
| 497707 | 2006 SP_{98} | — | September 18, 2006 | Kitt Peak | Spacewatch | NYS | 890 m | MPC · JPL |
| 497708 | 2006 SN_{103} | — | September 19, 2006 | Kitt Peak | Spacewatch | MAS | 610 m | MPC · JPL |
| 497709 | 2006 SX_{104} | — | September 19, 2006 | Catalina | CSS | · | 2.8 km | MPC · JPL |
| 497710 | 2006 SA_{106} | — | September 19, 2006 | Kitt Peak | Spacewatch | · | 920 m | MPC · JPL |
| 497711 | 2006 SE_{106} | — | September 19, 2006 | Kitt Peak | Spacewatch | · | 2.2 km | MPC · JPL |
| 497712 | 2006 SN_{114} | — | September 23, 2006 | Kitt Peak | Spacewatch | THM | 2.2 km | MPC · JPL |
| 497713 | 2006 SG_{116} | — | September 24, 2006 | Kitt Peak | Spacewatch | · | 2.6 km | MPC · JPL |
| 497714 | 2006 SS_{117} | — | September 15, 2006 | Kitt Peak | Spacewatch | · | 2.1 km | MPC · JPL |
| 497715 | 2006 SY_{119} | — | September 18, 2006 | Catalina | CSS | · | 1.2 km | MPC · JPL |
| 497716 | 2006 SK_{131} | — | September 18, 2006 | Catalina | CSS | · | 2.4 km | MPC · JPL |
| 497717 | 2006 SF_{134} | — | September 20, 2006 | Kitt Peak | Spacewatch | · | 2.3 km | MPC · JPL |
| 497718 | 2006 SH_{134} | — | September 16, 2006 | Catalina | CSS | · | 920 m | MPC · JPL |
| 497719 | 2006 SR_{145} | — | September 19, 2006 | Kitt Peak | Spacewatch | · | 2.5 km | MPC · JPL |
| 497720 | 2006 SC_{150} | — | September 19, 2006 | Kitt Peak | Spacewatch | · | 1.1 km | MPC · JPL |
| 497721 | 2006 SZ_{156} | — | September 15, 2006 | Kitt Peak | Spacewatch | · | 2.2 km | MPC · JPL |
| 497722 | 2006 SB_{158} | — | September 15, 2006 | Kitt Peak | Spacewatch | · | 2.2 km | MPC · JPL |
| 497723 | 2006 SO_{163} | — | September 24, 2006 | Kitt Peak | Spacewatch | · | 980 m | MPC · JPL |
| 497724 | 2006 SJ_{166} | — | September 25, 2006 | Kitt Peak | Spacewatch | · | 2.9 km | MPC · JPL |
| 497725 | 2006 SD_{167} | — | September 17, 2006 | Kitt Peak | Spacewatch | · | 900 m | MPC · JPL |
| 497726 | 2006 SN_{167} | — | September 25, 2006 | Kitt Peak | Spacewatch | · | 2.8 km | MPC · JPL |
| 497727 | 2006 SB_{170} | — | September 25, 2006 | Kitt Peak | Spacewatch | · | 2.4 km | MPC · JPL |
| 497728 | 2006 SH_{171} | — | September 17, 2006 | Kitt Peak | Spacewatch | · | 2.2 km | MPC · JPL |
| 497729 | 2006 SW_{175} | — | September 25, 2006 | Kitt Peak | Spacewatch | · | 2.4 km | MPC · JPL |
| 497730 | 2006 SP_{178} | — | September 25, 2006 | Mount Lemmon | Mount Lemmon Survey | · | 1.0 km | MPC · JPL |
| 497731 | 2006 SV_{180} | — | September 25, 2006 | Mount Lemmon | Mount Lemmon Survey | · | 770 m | MPC · JPL |
| 497732 | 2006 SS_{182} | — | September 25, 2006 | Kitt Peak | Spacewatch | MAS | 520 m | MPC · JPL |
| 497733 | 2006 SQ_{184} | — | September 25, 2006 | Kitt Peak | Spacewatch | VER | 2.5 km | MPC · JPL |
| 497734 | 2006 SO_{186} | — | September 25, 2006 | Kitt Peak | Spacewatch | · | 2.8 km | MPC · JPL |
| 497735 | 2006 SY_{192} | — | September 26, 2006 | Mount Lemmon | Mount Lemmon Survey | · | 2.8 km | MPC · JPL |
| 497736 | 2006 ST_{203} | — | September 25, 2006 | Kitt Peak | Spacewatch | · | 2.0 km | MPC · JPL |
| 497737 | 2006 ST_{205} | — | September 18, 2006 | Catalina | CSS | ERI | 1.2 km | MPC · JPL |
| 497738 | 2006 SX_{206} | — | September 25, 2006 | Mount Lemmon | Mount Lemmon Survey | · | 840 m | MPC · JPL |
| 497739 | 2006 SF_{213} | — | September 27, 2006 | Kitt Peak | Spacewatch | · | 2.4 km | MPC · JPL |
| 497740 | 2006 SH_{215} | — | September 17, 2006 | Kitt Peak | Spacewatch | · | 3.4 km | MPC · JPL |
| 497741 | 2006 SR_{215} | — | September 27, 2006 | Kitt Peak | Spacewatch | · | 870 m | MPC · JPL |
| 497742 | 2006 SP_{216} | — | September 17, 2006 | Kitt Peak | Spacewatch | NYS | 840 m | MPC · JPL |
| 497743 | 2006 SJ_{219} | — | September 15, 2006 | Kitt Peak | Spacewatch | · | 2.2 km | MPC · JPL |
| 497744 | 2006 SZ_{229} | — | September 18, 2006 | Kitt Peak | Spacewatch | · | 2.4 km | MPC · JPL |
| 497745 | 2006 SU_{232} | — | September 26, 2006 | Kitt Peak | Spacewatch | · | 1.8 km | MPC · JPL |
| 497746 | 2006 SE_{235} | — | September 18, 2006 | Kitt Peak | Spacewatch | · | 3.0 km | MPC · JPL |
| 497747 | 2006 SF_{236} | — | September 26, 2006 | Mount Lemmon | Mount Lemmon Survey | EOS | 1.5 km | MPC · JPL |
| 497748 | 2006 SJ_{239} | — | September 26, 2006 | Kitt Peak | Spacewatch | · | 870 m | MPC · JPL |
| 497749 | 2006 SF_{240} | — | September 18, 2006 | Kitt Peak | Spacewatch | · | 1.2 km | MPC · JPL |
| 497750 | 2006 SM_{242} | — | September 26, 2006 | Kitt Peak | Spacewatch | THM | 2.1 km | MPC · JPL |
| 497751 | 2006 SU_{247} | — | September 15, 2006 | Kitt Peak | Spacewatch | · | 970 m | MPC · JPL |
| 497752 | 2006 SA_{248} | — | September 15, 2006 | Kitt Peak | Spacewatch | EOS | 1.8 km | MPC · JPL |
| 497753 | 2006 SC_{248} | — | September 18, 2006 | Kitt Peak | Spacewatch | · | 2.3 km | MPC · JPL |
| 497754 | 2006 SE_{258} | — | September 15, 2006 | Kitt Peak | Spacewatch | · | 1.9 km | MPC · JPL |
| 497755 | 2006 SO_{264} | — | September 26, 2006 | Kitt Peak | Spacewatch | · | 1.2 km | MPC · JPL |
| 497756 | 2006 SZ_{278} | — | September 28, 2006 | Kitt Peak | Spacewatch | MAS | 750 m | MPC · JPL |
| 497757 | 2006 SU_{284} | — | September 29, 2006 | Anderson Mesa | LONEOS | · | 1.0 km | MPC · JPL |
| 497758 | 2006 SQ_{288} | — | September 26, 2006 | Catalina | CSS | · | 1.1 km | MPC · JPL |
| 497759 | 2006 SB_{290} | — | September 29, 2006 | Anderson Mesa | LONEOS | LIX | 3.6 km | MPC · JPL |
| 497760 | 2006 SB_{295} | — | September 25, 2006 | Kitt Peak | Spacewatch | MAS | 560 m | MPC · JPL |
| 497761 | 2006 SO_{297} | — | September 17, 2006 | Kitt Peak | Spacewatch | PHO | 740 m | MPC · JPL |
| 497762 | 2006 SL_{303} | — | September 17, 2006 | Catalina | CSS | VER | 2.5 km | MPC · JPL |
| 497763 | 2006 SV_{309} | — | September 15, 2006 | Kitt Peak | Spacewatch | TIR | 2.3 km | MPC · JPL |
| 497764 | 2006 SE_{310} | — | September 19, 2006 | Catalina | CSS | · | 2.7 km | MPC · JPL |
| 497765 | 2006 SK_{310} | — | September 27, 2006 | Kitt Peak | Spacewatch | · | 850 m | MPC · JPL |
| 497766 | 2006 SQ_{311} | — | September 17, 2006 | Kitt Peak | Spacewatch | · | 3.0 km | MPC · JPL |
| 497767 | 2006 SG_{313} | — | September 17, 2006 | Kitt Peak | Spacewatch | · | 2.6 km | MPC · JPL |
| 497768 | 2006 SG_{314} | — | September 27, 2006 | Kitt Peak | Spacewatch | THM | 2.2 km | MPC · JPL |
| 497769 | 2006 SV_{315} | — | September 17, 2006 | Kitt Peak | Spacewatch | MAS | 500 m | MPC · JPL |
| 497770 | 2006 SF_{324} | — | September 18, 2006 | Kitt Peak | Spacewatch | · | 960 m | MPC · JPL |
| 497771 | 2006 SU_{324} | — | September 27, 2006 | Kitt Peak | Spacewatch | · | 3.2 km | MPC · JPL |
| 497772 | 2006 SP_{327} | — | September 19, 2006 | Kitt Peak | Spacewatch | THM | 2.3 km | MPC · JPL |
| 497773 | 2006 SO_{328} | — | September 27, 2006 | Kitt Peak | Spacewatch | · | 2.4 km | MPC · JPL |
| 497774 | 2006 SS_{331} | — | September 28, 2006 | Mount Lemmon | Mount Lemmon Survey | · | 2.4 km | MPC · JPL |
| 497775 | 2006 SB_{332} | — | September 28, 2006 | Mount Lemmon | Mount Lemmon Survey | · | 1.2 km | MPC · JPL |
| 497776 | 2006 SM_{332} | — | September 28, 2006 | Mount Lemmon | Mount Lemmon Survey | ERI | 1.2 km | MPC · JPL |
| 497777 | 2006 SZ_{338} | — | September 28, 2006 | Kitt Peak | Spacewatch | NYS | 940 m | MPC · JPL |
| 497778 | 2006 SX_{339} | — | September 28, 2006 | Kitt Peak | Spacewatch | V | 500 m | MPC · JPL |
| 497779 | 2006 SV_{341} | — | September 28, 2006 | Kitt Peak | Spacewatch | · | 2.7 km | MPC · JPL |
| 497780 | 2006 SL_{342} | — | September 28, 2006 | Kitt Peak | Spacewatch | LIX | 3.2 km | MPC · JPL |
| 497781 | 2006 ST_{358} | — | September 30, 2006 | Catalina | CSS | · | 1.0 km | MPC · JPL |
| 497782 | 2006 SR_{367} | — | September 16, 2006 | Catalina | CSS | · | 1.3 km | MPC · JPL |
| 497783 | 2006 SV_{382} | — | September 28, 2006 | Apache Point | A. C. Becker | · | 2.7 km | MPC · JPL |
| 497784 | 2006 SB_{383} | — | September 29, 2006 | Apache Point | A. C. Becker | THM | 1.9 km | MPC · JPL |
| 497785 | 2006 SY_{384} | — | September 29, 2006 | Apache Point | A. C. Becker | · | 2.3 km | MPC · JPL |
| 497786 | 2006 SA_{387} | — | September 30, 2006 | Apache Point | A. C. Becker | L4 | 3.7 km | MPC · JPL |
| 497787 | 2006 SP_{387} | — | September 30, 2006 | Apache Point | A. C. Becker | · | 2.9 km | MPC · JPL |
| 497788 | 2006 SQ_{392} | — | September 26, 2006 | Mount Lemmon | Mount Lemmon Survey | H | 420 m | MPC · JPL |
| 497789 | 2006 SJ_{397} | — | September 25, 2006 | Kitt Peak | Spacewatch | URS | 3.0 km | MPC · JPL |
| 497790 | 2006 SD_{400} | — | September 19, 2006 | Catalina | CSS | · | 1.7 km | MPC · JPL |
| 497791 | 2006 SL_{400} | — | September 19, 2006 | Kitt Peak | Spacewatch | · | 2.0 km | MPC · JPL |
| 497792 | 2006 SS_{401} | — | September 30, 2006 | Mount Lemmon | Mount Lemmon Survey | ELF | 2.4 km | MPC · JPL |
| 497793 | 2006 SR_{402} | — | September 26, 2006 | Mount Lemmon | Mount Lemmon Survey | THM | 1.7 km | MPC · JPL |
| 497794 | 2006 ST_{402} | — | September 26, 2006 | Mount Lemmon | Mount Lemmon Survey | · | 2.5 km | MPC · JPL |
| 497795 | 2006 SU_{402} | — | September 26, 2006 | Mount Lemmon | Mount Lemmon Survey | · | 3.7 km | MPC · JPL |
| 497796 | 2006 SY_{408} | — | September 27, 2006 | Mount Lemmon | Mount Lemmon Survey | · | 810 m | MPC · JPL |
| 497797 | 2006 SN_{410} | — | September 17, 2006 | Kitt Peak | Spacewatch | EOS | 1.4 km | MPC · JPL |
| 497798 | 2006 TP_{3} | — | October 2, 2006 | Mount Lemmon | Mount Lemmon Survey | · | 880 m | MPC · JPL |
| 497799 | 2006 TC_{5} | — | October 2, 2006 | Mount Lemmon | Mount Lemmon Survey | · | 2.6 km | MPC · JPL |
| 497800 | 2006 TK_{8} | — | October 4, 2006 | Mount Lemmon | Mount Lemmon Survey | · | 910 m | MPC · JPL |

== 497801–497900 ==
back to top

| Designation | | | Discovery | | | Properties | | Ref |
| Permanent | Provisional | Named after | Date | Site | Discoverer(s) | Category | Diam. | Ref |
|---|---|---|---|---|---|---|---|---|
| 497801 | 2006 TB_{15} | — | October 11, 2006 | Kitt Peak | Spacewatch | · | 2.3 km | MPC · JPL |
| 497802 | 2006 TZ_{17} | — | October 3, 2006 | Mount Lemmon | Mount Lemmon Survey | · | 3.1 km | MPC · JPL |
| 497803 | 2006 TC_{23} | — | September 30, 2006 | Mount Lemmon | Mount Lemmon Survey | · | 2.9 km | MPC · JPL |
| 497804 | 2006 TP_{26} | — | September 26, 2006 | Mount Lemmon | Mount Lemmon Survey | · | 3.2 km | MPC · JPL |
| 497805 | 2006 TS_{30} | — | September 25, 2006 | Mount Lemmon | Mount Lemmon Survey | THM | 1.9 km | MPC · JPL |
| 497806 | 2006 TW_{32} | — | September 26, 2006 | Mount Lemmon | Mount Lemmon Survey | · | 2.0 km | MPC · JPL |
| 497807 | 2006 TC_{36} | — | October 12, 2006 | Kitt Peak | Spacewatch | · | 1.2 km | MPC · JPL |
| 497808 | 2006 TJ_{40} | — | September 27, 2006 | Mount Lemmon | Mount Lemmon Survey | · | 2.6 km | MPC · JPL |
| 497809 | 2006 TU_{51} | — | October 12, 2006 | Kitt Peak | Spacewatch | · | 3.7 km | MPC · JPL |
| 497810 | 2006 TJ_{70} | — | October 11, 2006 | Kitt Peak | Spacewatch | HYG | 2.6 km | MPC · JPL |
| 497811 | 2006 TW_{73} | — | October 2, 2006 | Mount Lemmon | Mount Lemmon Survey | · | 2.3 km | MPC · JPL |
| 497812 | 2006 TP_{77} | — | October 12, 2006 | Kitt Peak | Spacewatch | · | 2.5 km | MPC · JPL |
| 497813 | 2006 TL_{81} | — | October 2, 2006 | Mount Lemmon | Mount Lemmon Survey | · | 2.9 km | MPC · JPL |
| 497814 | 2006 TN_{91} | — | September 26, 2006 | Mount Lemmon | Mount Lemmon Survey | · | 3.0 km | MPC · JPL |
| 497815 | 2006 TX_{98} | — | October 15, 2006 | Kitt Peak | Spacewatch | THM | 2.0 km | MPC · JPL |
| 497816 | 2006 TF_{104} | — | October 15, 2006 | Kitt Peak | Spacewatch | · | 810 m | MPC · JPL |
| 497817 | 2006 TN_{104} | — | October 15, 2006 | Kitt Peak | Spacewatch | · | 1.0 km | MPC · JPL |
| 497818 | 2006 TG_{105} | — | October 15, 2006 | Kitt Peak | Spacewatch | THM | 1.8 km | MPC · JPL |
| 497819 | 2006 TX_{116} | — | October 3, 2006 | Apache Point | A. C. Becker | · | 2.1 km | MPC · JPL |
| 497820 | 2006 TZ_{119} | — | October 12, 2006 | Apache Point | A. C. Becker | VER | 1.9 km | MPC · JPL |
| 497821 | 2006 TR_{121} | — | October 12, 2006 | Kitt Peak | Spacewatch | · | 930 m | MPC · JPL |
| 497822 | 2006 TL_{124} | — | October 3, 2006 | Mount Lemmon | Mount Lemmon Survey | · | 2.4 km | MPC · JPL |
| 497823 | 2006 TZ_{128} | — | October 2, 2006 | Mount Lemmon | Mount Lemmon Survey | · | 2.5 km | MPC · JPL |
| 497824 | 2006 TE_{129} | — | October 4, 2006 | Mount Lemmon | Mount Lemmon Survey | · | 2.5 km | MPC · JPL |
| 497825 | 2006 TC_{130} | — | October 11, 2006 | Palomar | NEAT | THB | 2.6 km | MPC · JPL |
| 497826 | 2006 UU | — | September 17, 2006 | Kitt Peak | Spacewatch | LIX | 3.0 km | MPC · JPL |
| 497827 | 2006 UN_{4} | — | September 23, 2006 | Kitt Peak | Spacewatch | MAS | 560 m | MPC · JPL |
| 497828 | 2006 UY_{18} | — | September 25, 2006 | Kitt Peak | Spacewatch | · | 2.6 km | MPC · JPL |
| 497829 | 2006 UJ_{19} | — | October 16, 2006 | Kitt Peak | Spacewatch | · | 1.5 km | MPC · JPL |
| 497830 | 2006 UU_{19} | — | September 25, 2006 | Kitt Peak | Spacewatch | NYS | 820 m | MPC · JPL |
| 497831 | 2006 UZ_{20} | — | October 16, 2006 | Kitt Peak | Spacewatch | (5651) | 3.0 km | MPC · JPL |
| 497832 | 2006 UV_{29} | — | October 16, 2006 | Kitt Peak | Spacewatch | · | 1.9 km | MPC · JPL |
| 497833 | 2006 UO_{32} | — | October 4, 2006 | Mount Lemmon | Mount Lemmon Survey | · | 1 km | MPC · JPL |
| 497834 | 2006 UX_{36} | — | October 16, 2006 | Kitt Peak | Spacewatch | · | 2.1 km | MPC · JPL |
| 497835 | 2006 UE_{38} | — | October 16, 2006 | Kitt Peak | Spacewatch | MAS | 520 m | MPC · JPL |
| 497836 | 2006 UY_{45} | — | October 16, 2006 | Kitt Peak | Spacewatch | · | 1.2 km | MPC · JPL |
| 497837 | 2006 UX_{47} | — | October 17, 2006 | Kitt Peak | Spacewatch | · | 2.5 km | MPC · JPL |
| 497838 | 2006 UH_{50} | — | September 25, 2006 | Kitt Peak | Spacewatch | · | 3.0 km | MPC · JPL |
| 497839 | 2006 UH_{53} | — | October 4, 2006 | Mount Lemmon | Mount Lemmon Survey | (5931) | 2.7 km | MPC · JPL |
| 497840 | 2006 UD_{55} | — | October 17, 2006 | Kitt Peak | Spacewatch | · | 2.9 km | MPC · JPL |
| 497841 | 2006 UA_{59} | — | October 19, 2006 | Kitt Peak | Spacewatch | · | 2.2 km | MPC · JPL |
| 497842 | 2006 UP_{65} | — | August 28, 2006 | Kitt Peak | Spacewatch | · | 820 m | MPC · JPL |
| 497843 | 2006 UB_{73} | — | September 26, 2006 | Kitt Peak | Spacewatch | · | 1 km | MPC · JPL |
| 497844 | 2006 US_{73} | — | September 25, 2006 | Kitt Peak | Spacewatch | URS | 3.0 km | MPC · JPL |
| 497845 | 2006 UK_{77} | — | September 26, 2006 | Kitt Peak | Spacewatch | · | 2.1 km | MPC · JPL |
| 497846 | 2006 UA_{79} | — | October 17, 2006 | Kitt Peak | Spacewatch | · | 4.3 km | MPC · JPL |
| 497847 | 2006 UR_{79} | — | October 3, 2006 | Kitt Peak | Spacewatch | · | 3.0 km | MPC · JPL |
| 497848 | 2006 UV_{80} | — | October 17, 2006 | Catalina | CSS | EUP | 3.4 km | MPC · JPL |
| 497849 | 2006 UG_{82} | — | September 30, 2006 | Mount Lemmon | Mount Lemmon Survey | · | 2.8 km | MPC · JPL |
| 497850 | 2006 UE_{86} | — | September 28, 2006 | Catalina | CSS | · | 3.1 km | MPC · JPL |
| 497851 | 2006 UE_{94} | — | October 18, 2006 | Kitt Peak | Spacewatch | · | 2.5 km | MPC · JPL |
| 497852 | 2006 UC_{96} | — | October 2, 2006 | Mount Lemmon | Mount Lemmon Survey | MAS | 750 m | MPC · JPL |
| 497853 | 2006 UW_{97} | — | September 30, 2006 | Mount Lemmon | Mount Lemmon Survey | URS | 2.6 km | MPC · JPL |
| 497854 | 2006 UE_{100} | — | September 30, 2006 | Mount Lemmon | Mount Lemmon Survey | · | 3.3 km | MPC · JPL |
| 497855 | 2006 UL_{114} | — | September 24, 2006 | Kitt Peak | Spacewatch | · | 2.1 km | MPC · JPL |
| 497856 | 2006 UR_{119} | — | September 30, 2006 | Mount Lemmon | Mount Lemmon Survey | · | 2.7 km | MPC · JPL |
| 497857 | 2006 UB_{122} | — | October 19, 2006 | Kitt Peak | Spacewatch | · | 2.3 km | MPC · JPL |
| 497858 | 2006 UG_{122} | — | October 19, 2006 | Kitt Peak | Spacewatch | · | 2.0 km | MPC · JPL |
| 497859 | 2006 US_{122} | — | September 19, 2006 | Kitt Peak | Spacewatch | · | 840 m | MPC · JPL |
| 497860 | 2006 UN_{134} | — | October 2, 2006 | Mount Lemmon | Mount Lemmon Survey | NYS | 930 m | MPC · JPL |
| 497861 | 2006 UT_{138} | — | October 19, 2006 | Kitt Peak | Spacewatch | SUL | 1.8 km | MPC · JPL |
| 497862 | 2006 UH_{139} | — | October 19, 2006 | Kitt Peak | Spacewatch | · | 2.8 km | MPC · JPL |
| 497863 | 2006 UX_{157} | — | September 19, 2006 | Kitt Peak | Spacewatch | · | 2.9 km | MPC · JPL |
| 497864 | 2006 US_{160} | — | October 21, 2006 | Mount Lemmon | Mount Lemmon Survey | THM | 1.8 km | MPC · JPL |
| 497865 | 2006 UJ_{163} | — | October 2, 2006 | Mount Lemmon | Mount Lemmon Survey | · | 860 m | MPC · JPL |
| 497866 | 2006 UO_{163} | — | November 15, 1995 | Kitt Peak | Spacewatch | · | 2.5 km | MPC · JPL |
| 497867 | 2006 UV_{166} | — | October 3, 2006 | Mount Lemmon | Mount Lemmon Survey | · | 2.2 km | MPC · JPL |
| 497868 | 2006 UV_{174} | — | September 26, 2006 | Catalina | CSS | · | 1.1 km | MPC · JPL |
| 497869 | 2006 UC_{189} | — | September 28, 2006 | Catalina | CSS | · | 2.6 km | MPC · JPL |
| 497870 | 2006 UT_{195} | — | September 27, 2006 | Kitt Peak | Spacewatch | V | 490 m | MPC · JPL |
| 497871 | 2006 UU_{196} | — | October 20, 2006 | Kitt Peak | Spacewatch | · | 1.1 km | MPC · JPL |
| 497872 | 2006 UH_{197} | — | October 20, 2006 | Kitt Peak | Spacewatch | · | 700 m | MPC · JPL |
| 497873 | 2006 US_{197} | — | October 20, 2006 | Kitt Peak | Spacewatch | THM | 2.1 km | MPC · JPL |
| 497874 | 2006 UJ_{209} | — | October 4, 2006 | Mount Lemmon | Mount Lemmon Survey | · | 2.2 km | MPC · JPL |
| 497875 | 2006 UN_{211} | — | October 4, 2006 | Mount Lemmon | Mount Lemmon Survey | · | 3.3 km | MPC · JPL |
| 497876 | 2006 UO_{213} | — | April 20, 2004 | Kitt Peak | Spacewatch | · | 3.2 km | MPC · JPL |
| 497877 | 2006 UF_{214} | — | October 4, 2006 | Mount Lemmon | Mount Lemmon Survey | VER | 2.8 km | MPC · JPL |
| 497878 | 2006 UF_{219} | — | September 26, 2006 | Mount Lemmon | Mount Lemmon Survey | · | 3.6 km | MPC · JPL |
| 497879 | 2006 UZ_{221} | — | September 16, 2006 | Catalina | CSS | · | 3.1 km | MPC · JPL |
| 497880 | 2006 US_{227} | — | October 20, 2006 | Palomar | NEAT | · | 1.3 km | MPC · JPL |
| 497881 | 2006 UC_{239} | — | September 28, 2006 | Mount Lemmon | Mount Lemmon Survey | · | 870 m | MPC · JPL |
| 497882 | 2006 UF_{243} | — | September 25, 2006 | Mount Lemmon | Mount Lemmon Survey | · | 770 m | MPC · JPL |
| 497883 | 2006 UC_{251} | — | September 28, 2006 | Mount Lemmon | Mount Lemmon Survey | · | 970 m | MPC · JPL |
| 497884 | 2006 UD_{254} | — | October 27, 2006 | Mount Lemmon | Mount Lemmon Survey | THM | 1.9 km | MPC · JPL |
| 497885 | 2006 UX_{261} | — | October 28, 2006 | Mount Lemmon | Mount Lemmon Survey | · | 970 m | MPC · JPL |
| 497886 | 2006 UL_{266} | — | October 27, 2006 | Kitt Peak | Spacewatch | · | 1.2 km | MPC · JPL |
| 497887 | 2006 UM_{266} | — | October 27, 2006 | Kitt Peak | Spacewatch | · | 1.1 km | MPC · JPL |
| 497888 | 2006 UQ_{274} | — | September 14, 2006 | Kitt Peak | Spacewatch | LIX | 2.3 km | MPC · JPL |
| 497889 | 2006 UU_{275} | — | October 2, 2006 | Mount Lemmon | Mount Lemmon Survey | MAS | 570 m | MPC · JPL |
| 497890 | 2006 UC_{278} | — | October 28, 2006 | Kitt Peak | Spacewatch | THM | 1.8 km | MPC · JPL |
| 497891 | 2006 UF_{279} | — | September 30, 2006 | Mount Lemmon | Mount Lemmon Survey | LIX | 3.7 km | MPC · JPL |
| 497892 | 2006 UB_{283} | — | October 28, 2006 | Kitt Peak | Spacewatch | NYS | 770 m | MPC · JPL |
| 497893 | 2006 UZ_{287} | — | October 16, 2006 | Kitt Peak | Spacewatch | · | 990 m | MPC · JPL |
| 497894 | 2006 UR_{288} | — | September 26, 2006 | Kitt Peak | Spacewatch | HYG | 2.7 km | MPC · JPL |
| 497895 | 2006 UQ_{302} | — | September 30, 2006 | Mount Lemmon | Mount Lemmon Survey | EOS | 2.2 km | MPC · JPL |
| 497896 | 2006 UR_{322} | — | October 16, 2006 | Kitt Peak | Spacewatch | · | 710 m | MPC · JPL |
| 497897 | 2006 UH_{323} | — | September 30, 2006 | Mount Lemmon | Mount Lemmon Survey | · | 2.7 km | MPC · JPL |
| 497898 | 2006 UJ_{323} | — | October 19, 2006 | Kitt Peak | M. W. Buie | · | 2.4 km | MPC · JPL |
| 497899 | 2006 UM_{340} | — | October 21, 2006 | Kitt Peak | Spacewatch | · | 1.1 km | MPC · JPL |
| 497900 | 2006 UT_{358} | — | October 18, 2006 | Kitt Peak | Spacewatch | NYS | 990 m | MPC · JPL |

== 497901–498000 ==
back to top

| Designation | | | Discovery | | | Properties | | Ref |
| Permanent | Provisional | Named after | Date | Site | Discoverer(s) | Category | Diam. | Ref |
|---|---|---|---|---|---|---|---|---|
| 497901 | 2006 UR_{359} | — | October 21, 2006 | Kitt Peak | Spacewatch | · | 1.1 km | MPC · JPL |
| 497902 | 2006 UU_{359} | — | October 3, 2006 | Mount Lemmon | Mount Lemmon Survey | · | 1.1 km | MPC · JPL |
| 497903 | 2006 VU_{5} | — | September 28, 2006 | Mount Lemmon | Mount Lemmon Survey | · | 940 m | MPC · JPL |
| 497904 | 2006 VH_{7} | — | October 27, 2006 | Mount Lemmon | Mount Lemmon Survey | · | 940 m | MPC · JPL |
| 497905 | 2006 VC_{8} | — | November 1, 2006 | Mount Lemmon | Mount Lemmon Survey | · | 930 m | MPC · JPL |
| 497906 | 2006 VB_{19} | — | November 9, 2006 | Kitt Peak | Spacewatch | · | 980 m | MPC · JPL |
| 497907 | 2006 VA_{20} | — | November 9, 2006 | Kitt Peak | Spacewatch | NYS | 1.1 km | MPC · JPL |
| 497908 | 2006 VN_{26} | — | September 28, 2006 | Mount Lemmon | Mount Lemmon Survey | NYS | 1.1 km | MPC · JPL |
| 497909 | 2006 VV_{26} | — | September 27, 2006 | Mount Lemmon | Mount Lemmon Survey | MAS | 550 m | MPC · JPL |
| 497910 | 2006 VT_{38} | — | October 21, 2006 | Kitt Peak | Spacewatch | · | 1.0 km | MPC · JPL |
| 497911 | 2006 VQ_{40} | — | November 12, 2006 | Mount Lemmon | Mount Lemmon Survey | · | 990 m | MPC · JPL |
| 497912 | 2006 VS_{45} | — | November 13, 2006 | Socorro | LINEAR | T_{j} (2.99) · EUP | 3.6 km | MPC · JPL |
| 497913 | 2006 VZ_{46} | — | November 9, 2006 | Kitt Peak | Spacewatch | · | 2.7 km | MPC · JPL |
| 497914 | 2006 VF_{53} | — | November 11, 2006 | Kitt Peak | Spacewatch | VER | 2.6 km | MPC · JPL |
| 497915 | 2006 VZ_{53} | — | October 23, 2006 | Kitt Peak | Spacewatch | · | 3.1 km | MPC · JPL |
| 497916 | 2006 VQ_{57} | — | November 11, 2006 | Kitt Peak | Spacewatch | MAS | 680 m | MPC · JPL |
| 497917 | 2006 VK_{58} | — | October 22, 2006 | Mount Lemmon | Mount Lemmon Survey | · | 980 m | MPC · JPL |
| 497918 | 2006 VT_{59} | — | November 11, 2006 | Kitt Peak | Spacewatch | NYS | 1.1 km | MPC · JPL |
| 497919 | 2006 VZ_{68} | — | November 11, 2006 | Kitt Peak | Spacewatch | EUP | 4.3 km | MPC · JPL |
| 497920 | 2006 VF_{81} | — | October 31, 2006 | Mount Lemmon | Mount Lemmon Survey | · | 1.3 km | MPC · JPL |
| 497921 | 2006 VG_{82} | — | November 13, 2006 | Kitt Peak | Spacewatch | · | 2.3 km | MPC · JPL |
| 497922 | 2006 VC_{97} | — | November 11, 2006 | Kitt Peak | Spacewatch | · | 930 m | MPC · JPL |
| 497923 | 2006 VJ_{98} | — | November 11, 2006 | Kitt Peak | Spacewatch | HYG | 2.8 km | MPC · JPL |
| 497924 | 2006 VV_{107} | — | September 28, 2006 | Mount Lemmon | Mount Lemmon Survey | THB | 2.9 km | MPC · JPL |
| 497925 | 2006 VT_{117} | — | October 31, 2006 | Kitt Peak | Spacewatch | NYS | 800 m | MPC · JPL |
| 497926 | 2006 VL_{121} | — | October 19, 2006 | Catalina | CSS | · | 3.9 km | MPC · JPL |
| 497927 | 2006 VP_{125} | — | November 1, 2006 | Mount Lemmon | Mount Lemmon Survey | · | 760 m | MPC · JPL |
| 497928 | 2006 VJ_{131} | — | November 15, 2006 | Kitt Peak | Spacewatch | · | 2.6 km | MPC · JPL |
| 497929 | 2006 VX_{138} | — | October 27, 2006 | Mount Lemmon | Mount Lemmon Survey | V | 500 m | MPC · JPL |
| 497930 | 2006 VY_{143} | — | October 23, 2006 | Catalina | CSS | · | 4.0 km | MPC · JPL |
| 497931 | 2006 VW_{171} | — | November 11, 2006 | Kitt Peak | Spacewatch | · | 990 m | MPC · JPL |
| 497932 | 2006 WX_{28} | — | September 28, 2006 | Mount Lemmon | Mount Lemmon Survey | MAS | 720 m | MPC · JPL |
| 497933 | 2006 WB_{32} | — | October 23, 2006 | Mount Lemmon | Mount Lemmon Survey | · | 1.1 km | MPC · JPL |
| 497934 | 2006 WZ_{43} | — | November 16, 2006 | Mount Lemmon | Mount Lemmon Survey | · | 910 m | MPC · JPL |
| 497935 | 2006 WN_{45} | — | September 30, 2006 | Mount Lemmon | Mount Lemmon Survey | CYB | 3.0 km | MPC · JPL |
| 497936 | 2006 WO_{45} | — | November 16, 2006 | Mount Lemmon | Mount Lemmon Survey | · | 3.9 km | MPC · JPL |
| 497937 | 2006 WQ_{57} | — | October 19, 2006 | Catalina | CSS | H | 520 m | MPC · JPL |
| 497938 | 2006 WS_{72} | — | September 25, 2006 | Mount Lemmon | Mount Lemmon Survey | · | 780 m | MPC · JPL |
| 497939 | 2006 WS_{96} | — | September 28, 2006 | Mount Lemmon | Mount Lemmon Survey | · | 1.0 km | MPC · JPL |
| 497940 | 2006 WP_{104} | — | November 19, 2006 | Kitt Peak | Spacewatch | · | 860 m | MPC · JPL |
| 497941 | 2006 WB_{110} | — | November 19, 2006 | Kitt Peak | Spacewatch | · | 770 m | MPC · JPL |
| 497942 | 2006 WX_{110} | — | November 19, 2006 | Kitt Peak | Spacewatch | · | 890 m | MPC · JPL |
| 497943 | 2006 WA_{133} | — | October 27, 2006 | Mount Lemmon | Mount Lemmon Survey | MAS | 620 m | MPC · JPL |
| 497944 | 2006 WQ_{135} | — | October 23, 2006 | Mount Lemmon | Mount Lemmon Survey | · | 890 m | MPC · JPL |
| 497945 | 2006 WK_{146} | — | November 20, 2006 | Socorro | LINEAR | LIX | 3.2 km | MPC · JPL |
| 497946 | 2006 WY_{147} | — | September 28, 2006 | Mount Lemmon | Mount Lemmon Survey | · | 2.8 km | MPC · JPL |
| 497947 | 2006 WV_{149} | — | November 20, 2006 | Kitt Peak | Spacewatch | · | 1.0 km | MPC · JPL |
| 497948 | 2006 WR_{150} | — | November 20, 2006 | Kitt Peak | Spacewatch | (5) | 1.4 km | MPC · JPL |
| 497949 | 2006 WK_{158} | — | November 22, 2006 | Kitt Peak | Spacewatch | V | 510 m | MPC · JPL |
| 497950 | 2006 WP_{179} | — | November 24, 2006 | Mount Lemmon | Mount Lemmon Survey | · | 2.3 km | MPC · JPL |
| 497951 | 2006 WD_{188} | — | November 16, 2006 | Kitt Peak | Spacewatch | · | 1.2 km | MPC · JPL |
| 497952 | 2006 WF_{195} | — | September 28, 2006 | Mount Lemmon | Mount Lemmon Survey | · | 3.1 km | MPC · JPL |
| 497953 | 2006 WW_{205} | — | November 27, 2006 | Mount Lemmon | Mount Lemmon Survey | · | 1.4 km | MPC · JPL |
| 497954 | 2006 XG_{11} | — | October 31, 2006 | Kitt Peak | Spacewatch | · | 3.2 km | MPC · JPL |
| 497955 | 2006 XX_{12} | — | December 1, 2006 | Mount Lemmon | Mount Lemmon Survey | · | 1.1 km | MPC · JPL |
| 497956 | 2006 XE_{19} | — | December 11, 2006 | Kitt Peak | Spacewatch | · | 1.1 km | MPC · JPL |
| 497957 | 2006 XD_{34} | — | December 11, 2006 | Kitt Peak | Spacewatch | · | 1.8 km | MPC · JPL |
| 497958 | 2006 XG_{35} | — | December 11, 2006 | Kitt Peak | Spacewatch | · | 1.3 km | MPC · JPL |
| 497959 | 2006 XZ_{49} | — | November 15, 2006 | Mount Lemmon | Mount Lemmon Survey | CYB | 4.7 km | MPC · JPL |
| 497960 | 2006 XP_{51} | — | October 23, 2006 | Catalina | CSS | · | 4.0 km | MPC · JPL |
| 497961 | 2007 AC_{8} | — | December 23, 2006 | Catalina | CSS | (116763) | 2.9 km | MPC · JPL |
| 497962 | 2007 AA_{28} | — | January 10, 2007 | Mount Lemmon | Mount Lemmon Survey | EUN | 960 m | MPC · JPL |
| 497963 | 2007 AD_{29} | — | January 10, 2007 | Mount Lemmon | Mount Lemmon Survey | · | 800 m | MPC · JPL |
| 497964 | 2007 AT_{29} | — | January 10, 2007 | Kitt Peak | Spacewatch | · | 1.4 km | MPC · JPL |
| 497965 | 2007 BQ_{1} | — | January 16, 2007 | Catalina | CSS | (5) | 1.1 km | MPC · JPL |
| 497966 | 2007 BO_{11} | — | January 17, 2007 | Kitt Peak | Spacewatch | EUN | 1.3 km | MPC · JPL |
| 497967 | 2007 BF_{22} | — | January 24, 2007 | Socorro | LINEAR | · | 1.2 km | MPC · JPL |
| 497968 | 2007 BW_{32} | — | January 24, 2007 | Mount Lemmon | Mount Lemmon Survey | · | 800 m | MPC · JPL |
| 497969 | 2007 BO_{33} | — | January 8, 2007 | Mount Lemmon | Mount Lemmon Survey | · | 1.2 km | MPC · JPL |
| 497970 | 2007 BB_{39} | — | December 24, 2006 | Kitt Peak | Spacewatch | · | 1.8 km | MPC · JPL |
| 497971 | 2007 BU_{41} | — | November 22, 2006 | Mount Lemmon | Mount Lemmon Survey | · | 1.1 km | MPC · JPL |
| 497972 | 2007 BL_{79} | — | January 27, 2007 | Kitt Peak | Spacewatch | · | 800 m | MPC · JPL |
| 497973 | 2007 BG_{80} | — | January 17, 2007 | Palomar | NEAT | · | 1.7 km | MPC · JPL |
| 497974 | 2007 BQ_{101} | — | January 27, 2007 | Kitt Peak | Spacewatch | · | 1 km | MPC · JPL |
| 497975 | 2007 CZ_{10} | — | January 10, 2007 | Mount Lemmon | Mount Lemmon Survey | CYB | 2.7 km | MPC · JPL |
| 497976 | 2007 CT_{16} | — | February 8, 2007 | Mount Lemmon | Mount Lemmon Survey | · | 960 m | MPC · JPL |
| 497977 | 2007 CO_{27} | — | January 9, 2007 | Mount Lemmon | Mount Lemmon Survey | · | 850 m | MPC · JPL |
| 497978 | 2007 CS_{29} | — | January 25, 2007 | Kitt Peak | Spacewatch | KON | 1.8 km | MPC · JPL |
| 497979 | 2007 CF_{37} | — | January 27, 2007 | Kitt Peak | Spacewatch | ADE | 1.4 km | MPC · JPL |
| 497980 | 2007 CM_{45} | — | November 27, 2006 | Mount Lemmon | Mount Lemmon Survey | · | 1.2 km | MPC · JPL |
| 497981 | 2007 CA_{58} | — | February 9, 2007 | Catalina | CSS | · | 2.1 km | MPC · JPL |
| 497982 | 2007 CJ_{79} | — | February 9, 2007 | Catalina | CSS | · | 1.6 km | MPC · JPL |
| 497983 | 2007 DS_{15} | — | February 17, 2007 | Kitt Peak | Spacewatch | · | 1.2 km | MPC · JPL |
| 497984 | 2007 DR_{18} | — | February 17, 2007 | Kitt Peak | Spacewatch | · | 1.4 km | MPC · JPL |
| 497985 | 2007 DT_{18} | — | February 17, 2007 | Kitt Peak | Spacewatch | KON | 1.7 km | MPC · JPL |
| 497986 | 2007 DC_{23} | — | February 17, 2007 | Kitt Peak | Spacewatch | · | 1 km | MPC · JPL |
| 497987 | 2007 DF_{24} | — | February 17, 2007 | Kitt Peak | Spacewatch | · | 1.2 km | MPC · JPL |
| 497988 | 2007 DK_{30} | — | February 17, 2007 | Kitt Peak | Spacewatch | EUN | 1.1 km | MPC · JPL |
| 497989 | 2007 DD_{40} | — | January 10, 2007 | Kitt Peak | Spacewatch | · | 1.1 km | MPC · JPL |
| 497990 | 2007 DC_{44} | — | February 17, 2007 | Mount Lemmon | Mount Lemmon Survey | MAR | 950 m | MPC · JPL |
| 497991 | 2007 DH_{52} | — | February 17, 2007 | Mount Lemmon | Mount Lemmon Survey | MAR | 1.3 km | MPC · JPL |
| 497992 | 2007 DT_{66} | — | February 21, 2007 | Kitt Peak | Spacewatch | · | 1.5 km | MPC · JPL |
| 497993 | 2007 DA_{75} | — | February 21, 2007 | Kitt Peak | Spacewatch | MAS | 650 m | MPC · JPL |
| 497994 | 2007 DF_{94} | — | February 23, 2007 | Kitt Peak | Spacewatch | GEF | 1.2 km | MPC · JPL |
| 497995 | 2007 DC_{100} | — | February 25, 2007 | Mount Lemmon | Mount Lemmon Survey | · | 1.4 km | MPC · JPL |
| 497996 | 2007 DV_{110} | — | February 22, 2007 | Kitt Peak | Spacewatch | · | 1.1 km | MPC · JPL |
| 497997 | 2007 EK_{19} | — | January 27, 2007 | Kitt Peak | Spacewatch | · | 710 m | MPC · JPL |
| 497998 | 2007 EH_{50} | — | March 10, 2007 | Mount Lemmon | Mount Lemmon Survey | · | 1.4 km | MPC · JPL |
| 497999 | 2007 EO_{55} | — | March 12, 2007 | Mount Lemmon | Mount Lemmon Survey | (5) | 920 m | MPC · JPL |
| 498000 | 2007 EO_{58} | — | February 6, 2007 | Kitt Peak | Spacewatch | · | 1.2 km | MPC · JPL |

back to top

== Meaning of names ==
As minor planet discoveries are confirmed, they are given a permanent number by the IAU's Minor Planet Center (MPC), and the discoverers can then submit names for them, following the IAU's naming conventions. The list below concerns those minor planets in the specified number-range that have received names, and explains the meanings of those names.

Official naming citations of newly named small Solar System bodies are approved and published in a bulletin by IAU's Working Group for Small Bodies Nomenclature (WGSBN). Before May 2021, citations were published in MPC's Minor Planet Circulars for many decades. Recent citations can also be found on the JPL Small-Body Database (SBDB). Until his death in 2016, German astronomer Lutz D. Schmadel compiled these citations into the Dictionary of Minor Planet Names (DMP) and regularly updated the collection.

Based on Paul Herget's The Names of the Minor Planets, Schmadel also researched the unclear origin of numerous asteroids, most of which had been named prior to World War II. This article incorporates text from this source, which is in the public domain: SBDB New namings may only be added to this list below after official publication as the preannouncement of names is condemned. The WGSBN publishes a comprehensive guideline for the naming rules of non-cometary small Solar System bodies.

| Named minor planet | Provisional | This minor planet was named for... | Ref · Catalog |
|---|---|---|---|
| 497593 Kejimkujik | 2006 JU_{69} | Kejimkujik National Park and National Historic Site is an area of natural beauty and historical significance in Nova Scotia, Canada. The indigenous Mi'kmaq people consider Kejimkujik to be a sacred ancestral place. The Royal Astronomical Society of Canada declared Kejimkujik to be a Dark Sky Preserve in 2010. | IAU · 497593 |
| 497700 MacDougall | 2006 SC_{80} | Aidan J. MacDougall, Canadian student of astrophysics at the University of Waterloo as well as an intern at the Canadian Space Agency. | IAU · 497700 |
