= Boggy Lake Wilderness Area =

Wilderness area in Nova Scotia, Canada

- Interactive map of Boggy Lake Wilderness Area
- Location: Nova Scotia
- Nearest city: New Chester
- Area: 4,670 hectares (11,500 acres)
- Established: January 23, 2004
- Governing body: Nova Scotia Department of Environment and Climate Change

Boggy Lake Wilderness Area is a protected wilderness area located in Guysborough County, Nova Scotia, Canada, adjacent to New Chester. The wilderness area is governed by the Nova Scotia Department of Environment and Climate Change, under the Wilderness Areas Protection Act.

== Geography ==
Boggy Lake Wilderness Area comprises approximately 4,670 hectares (11,500 acres) in area. The wilderness area has many woodlands, lakes, and river. Numerous drumlins are scattered throughout the wilderness area.

== Ecology ==
=== Fauna ===
Boggy Lake Wilderness Area provides habitat for the white-tailed deer and the endangered mainland moose, and it historically served as one of the final regional refuges for caribou.

=== Flora ===
Boggy Lake Wilderness Area is dominated with shade-tolerant deciduous and coniferous forests. It is also dominant with hardwood and sugar maple, yellow birch, and red spruce. Lichen species include Leptogium saturninum, Lobaria pulmonaria, Lobaria quercizans, and Parmeliella triptophylla.

== Recreation ==
Boggy Lake Wilderness Area offers a variety of opportunities for canoeing, camping and angling in a wilderness setting. The wilderness area is suitable for off-trail exploring. However, no managed hiking trails exist.

Northern portions of the wilderness area overlaps the Liscomb Game Sanctuary, which restricts hunting to muzzleloader, bow, and crossbow.

== History ==
Boggy Lake Wilderness Area has been established on January 23, 2004. In 2015, a 946 hectares (2,340 acres) patch of land conjoined the wilderness area.

== Access ==
Boggy Lake Wilderness Area can be accessed via Nova Scotia Trunk 7 and Nova Scotia Route 374, as well as forest access roads located around its perimeter. Other access points include drive-to boat launches at Bear Lake, Round Lake and Long Lake.

== See also ==
- List of protected areas of Nova Scotia
- Boggy Lake
