= List of provincial parks in Nova Scotia =

This is a list of provincial parks in Nova Scotia, Canada. These provincial parks are maintained by the Nova Scotia Provincial Parks branch of the Department of Natural Resources.

== Annapolis County ==
Name	Established	Coordinates
Cottage Cove Provincial Park		44.993367°N 65.178517°W
Fundy Provincial Park		44.743895°N 65.679359°W
Mickey Hill Provincial Park		44.732583°N 65.493367°W
North Mountain Provincial Park		44.715906°N 65.727167°W
Roxbury Provincial Park		44.805633°N 65.167422°W
Upper Clements Provincial Park	1979-03-27	44.701388888889°N 65.566388888889°W
Valleyview Provincial Park	1973-02-13	44.871388888889°N 65.3125°W

== Antigonish County ==
Name	Established	Coordinates
Arisaig Provincial Park	1981-08-18	45.755555555556°N 62.1675°W
Bayfield Beach Provincial Park	2014-08-12	45.640078°N 61.759247°W
Beaver Mountain Provincial Park		45.564444444444°N 62.163888888889°W
Cape George Provincial Park		45.871917°N 61.899333°W
Cape Jack Beach Provincial Park		45.68294°N 61.574378°W
Dunns Beach Provincial Park		45.686602°N 61.878519°W
Linwood Provincial Park		45.638463°N 61.586952°W
Mahoney Beach Provincial Park		45.706432°N 61.907659°W
Monks Head Provincial Park		45.667018°N 61.825733°W
Pomquet Beach Provincial Park		45.64485°N 61.821417°W

== Cape Breton County ==
Name	Established	Commons category	Picture	Coordinates
Barrachois Provincial Park	1983-03-29			46.141666666667°N 60.443333333333°W
Belfry Beach Provincial Park				45.759166°N 60.211773°W
Ben Eoin Provincial Park	1975-02-11	Ben Eoin Provincial Park		45.96222222°N 60.45972222°W
Big Pond Beach Provincial Park Reserve				46.260501°N 60.235291°W
Dominion Beach Provincial Park	1992-03-10			46.220277777778°N 60.039722222222°W
Gaspereaux River Provincial Park				45.908836°N 60.407209°W
Groves Point Provincial Park	1980-08-26			46.229166666667°N 60.345277777778°W
Main-A-Dieu Provincial Park				46.000224°N 59.848108°W
Mira River Provincial Park	1976-02-05			46.029444444444°N 60.044166666667°W
Petersfield Provincial Park	1984-11-13			46.146944444444°N 60.219722222222°W

== Colchester County ==
Name	Established	Coordinates
Balmoral Mills Provincial Park		45.64305°N 63.194808°W
Brule Shore Provincial Park		45.746949°N 63.222885°W
Caddell Rapids Lookoff Provincial Park		45.199033°N 63.390433°W
Five Islands Provincial Park	1972-03-28	45.393888888889°N 64.054166666667°W
Londonderry Provincial Park		45.471717°N 63.596383°W
MacElmons Pond Provincial Park		45.391111111111°N 63.4275°W
Shubenacadie Provincial Park		45.097162°N 63.388753°W
Tatamagouche Provincial Park	1974-12-19	45.706944444444°N 63.268888888889°W

== Cumberland County ==
Name	Established	Commons category	Picture	Coordinates
Amherst Shore Provincial Park	2000-08-30			45.95°N 63.8867°W
Blue Sea Beach Provincial Park				45.8048°N 63.30125°W
Cape Chignecto Provincial Park	1998-06-23	Cape Chignecto Provincial Park		45.3503°N 64.8251°W
Fox Harbour Provincial Park	1990-11-20			45.835°N 63.4325°W
Gulf Shore Provincial Park	1972-02-08			45.875°N 63.626666666667°W
Heather Beach Provincial Park	1980-05-20			45.874444444444°N 63.7525°W
Northport Beach Provincial Park	1974-12-19			45.926111111111°N 63.844444444444°W
Shinimicas Provincial Park	1973-03-06			45.870277777778°N 63.908888888889°W
Tidnish Dock Provincial Park	1982-07-27			45.997222222222°N 64.007777777778°W
Wentworth Provincial Park	1972-06-01			45.627222222222°N 63.567222222222°W

== Digby County ==
Name	Established	Picture	Coordinates
Annapolis Basin Look Off Provincial Park	1996-04-10		44.639166666667°N 65.756388888889°W
Central Grove Provincial Park	1976-07-13		44.334722222222°N 66.275555555556°W
Lake Midway Provincial Park	1981-08-18		44.529722222222°N 66.041111111111°W
Mavillette Beach Provincial Park	1983-05-31		44.09°N 66.192777777778°W
New France Provincial Park			44.320914°N 65.765233°W
Savary Provincial Park	1974-12-19		44.512777777778°N 65.907222222222°W
Smiths Cove Look Off Provincial Park	1996-04-10		44.613611111111°N 65.690555555556°W
Smuggler's Cove Provincial Park	1982-08-10		44.17°N 66.183333333333°W

== Guysborough County ==
Name	Established	Picture	Coordinates
Andrews Island Provincial Park			45.300214°N 60.955582°W
Black Duck Cove Provincial Park			45.275059°N 61.029932°W
Boylston Provincial Park	1972-01-25		45.423333333333°N 61.528888888889°W
Cooeycoff Lake Provincial Park			45.305976°N 61.222343°W
Ecum Secum Provincial Park			44.961059°N 62.129316°W
Judds Pool Provincial Park	1983-04-05		45.02°N 62.210555555556°W
Lochiel Lake Provincial Park	1975-02-11		45.354166666667°N 62.058611111111°W
Marie Joseph Provincial Park			44.967777777778°N 62.084722222222°W
New Harbour Provincial Park			45.18164°N 61.456318°W
Pearts Cove Provincial Park			45.375751°N 61.496658°W
Port Bickerton Provincial Park			45.098151°N 61.683083°W
Port Shoreham Beach Provincial Park			45.426117°N 61.3991°W
Salsman Provincial Park	1972-06-01		45.236111111111°N 61.770277777778°W
Sherbrooke Lake Provincial Park			45.138151°N 61.954308°W
Sherbrooke Provincial Park			45.152517°N 61.975317°W
Tor Bay Provincial Park			45.187917°N 61.35445°W
West Cooks Cove Provincial Park			45.352249°N 61.506958°W

== Halifax County ==
Name	Established	Commons category	Picture	Coordinates
Blind Bay Provincial Park				44.525347°N 63.841639°W
Clam Harbour Beach Provincial Park	1980-05-13			44.731388888889°N 62.891388888889°W
Cleveland Beach Provincial Park	1978-11-28			44.65°N 63.996388888889°W
Cole Harbour-Lawrencetown Provincial Park	1998-12-15			44.662222222222°N 63.403611111111°W
Crystal Crescent Beach Provincial Park	1981-11-03			44.460277777778°N 63.620277777778°W
Dollar Lake Provincial Park	1981-03-10			44.9303°N 63.3186°W
Elderbank Provincial Park				44.980617°N 63.216167°W
Herring Cove Provincial Park				44.572538°N 63.552207°W
Hubbards Provincial Park				44.638717°N 64.06135°W
Jerry Lawrence Provincial Park	1976-07-13			44.689444444444°N 63.846111111111°W
Lake Charlotte Provincial Park	2015-12-29			44.777258°N 62.922821°W
Laurie Provincial Park	1972-01-25			44.883888888889°N 63.601944444444°W
Long Lake Provincial Park	1984-10-09	Long Lake Provincial Park (Nova Scotia)		44.6175°N 63.6353°W
Lower East Chezzetcook Provincial Park				44.690223°N 63.188467°W
Martinique Beach Provincial Park	1971-06-29			44.692222222222°N 63.131666666667°W
McCormacks Beach Provincial Park				45.963883333333°N 60.81035°W
McNabs and Lawlor Islands Provincial Park	2002-11-01			44.60992°N 63.515433°W
Moose River Gold Mines Provincial Park	1986-06-24			44.980833333333°N 62.944722222222°W
Mount William Provincial Park				45.117341°N 62.976766°W
Musquodoboit Valley Provincial Park	1973-06-19			45.055277777778°N 63.112222222222°W
Oakfield Provincial Park	1973-11-06			44.915277777778°N 63.587222222222°W
Owls Head Provincial Park Reserve				44.71798°N 62.824202°W
Paces Lake Provincial Park				44.797847°N 63.219452°W
Porters Lake Provincial Park	1972-06-13			44.687777777778°N 63.301666666667°W
Portobello Provincial Park				44.745607°N 63.563327°W
Queensland Beach Provincial Park	1980-05-07			44.636944444444°N 64.028333333333°W
Sackville Lakes Provincial Park	2013-07-02			44.7791667°N 63.6569444°W
Shubenacadie Canal and Waterway Provincial Park				44.703386°N 63.556662°W
Spry Bay Provincial Park				44.842083°N 62.620233°W
Taylor Head Provincial Park	1980-05-13			44.818611111111°N 62.563055555556°W
Upper Tantallon Provincial Park				44.699636°N 63.857174°W
Wellington Provincial Park				44.863449°N 63.624465°W
West Dover Provincial Park	2015-12-29			44.510305°N 63.908587°W
William E. DeGarthe Memorial Provincial Park	1988-08-03			44.494166666667°N 63.914166666667°W

== Hants County ==
Name	Established	Coordinates
Anthony Provincial Park	1974-12-19	45.315277777778°N 63.605833333333°W
Bell Provincial Park	2014-08-12	45.759166°N 60.211773°W
Cheverie Provincial Park		45.154934°N 64.178782°W
Cockscomb Lake Provincial Park		44.936231°N 63.864169°W
Falls Lake Provincial Park	1984-03-13	44.841944444444°N 64.240277777778°W
Horne Settlement Provincial Park		44.939829°N 63.559459°W
Smileys Provincial Park	1971-10-19	45.013888888889°N 63.963333333333°W

== Inverness County ==
Name	Established	Coordinates
Ainslie Point Provincial Park		46.161031°N 61.218309°W
Craigmore Provincial Park	1973-07-03	45.811666666667°N 61.481666666667°W
Lake O' Law Provincial Park		46.276388888889°N 60.962222222222°W
Mabou Provincial Park	1974-12-19	46.081666666667°N 61.372777777778°W
MacCormack Beach Provincial Park		45.9639°N 60.8103°W
Marble Mountain Provincial Park		45.823973°N 61.036413°W
North Ainslie Provincial Park		46.179011°N 61.188655°W
Orangedale Provincial Park		45.89495°N 61.078663°W
Port Hood Station Provincial Park	2015-12-29	46.003183°N 61.52995°W
Scottsville Provincial Park		46.192619°N 61.156511°W
South West Margaree Provincial Park	1975-02-11	46.283611111111°N 61.167222222222°W
West Mabou Beach Provincial Park	2001-08-23	46.077002°N 61.473645°W
Whycocomagh Provincial Park	1972-01-25	45.968055555556°N 61.101388888889°W

== Kings County ==
Name	Established	Picture	Coordinates
Blomidon Lookoff Provincial Park			45.199533°N 64.409067°W
Blomidon Provincial Park			45.2681°N 64.337°W
Cape Split Provincial Park			45.314667°N 64.42925°W
Clairmont Provincial Park	1972-06-27		45.009166666667°N 64.911111111111°W
Coldbrook Provincial Park	1980-08-05		45.068055555556°N 64.573611111111°W
Lake George Provincial Park			44.924417°N 64.68961°W
Lumsden Pond Provincial Park	1981-11-03		45.024444444444°N 64.397777777778°W
Scots Bay Provincial Park			45.300512°N 64.397594°W

== Lunenburg County ==
Name	Established	Coordinates
Bayswater Beach Provincial Park	1976-07-13	44.5025°N 64.066111111111°W
Card Lake Provincial Park	1976-11-30	44.719722222222°N 64.264444444444°W
Cookville Provincial Park		44.4228°N 64.551883°W
East River Provincial Park		44.588333333333°N 64.172222222222°W
Fancy Lake Provincial Park	1985-03-12	44.328611111111°N 64.531944444444°W
Graves Island Provincial Park	1971-11-23	44.560833333333°N 64.206111111111°W
Hirtles Beach Provincial Park		44.264823°N 64.273582°W
Kingsburg Beach Provincial Park		44.274478°N 64.258454°W
Moshers Beach Provincial Park		44.257375°N 64.28946°W
Pinehurst Provincial Park		44.489508055556°N 64.641666111111°W
Rissers Beach Provincial Park	1973-06-19	44.230833333333°N 64.429722222222°W
Second Peninsula Provincial Park	2013-05-21	44.404722222222°N 64.296111111111°W
Wentzells Lake Provincial Park	1983-03-29	44.465555555556°N 64.621666666667°W

== Pictou County ==
Name	Established	Commons category	Picture	Coordinates
Cape John Beach Provincial Park				45.799175°N 63.105125°W
Caribou-Munroes Island Provincial Park	1972-02-22			45.721666666667°N 62.654166666667°W
Green Hill Provincial Park	1984-03-06			45.582777777778°N 62.793888888889°W
Harris Provincial Park				45.686807°N 62.746482°W
MacKenzie Beach Provincial Park				45.759476°N 62.715862°W
Melmerby Beach Provincial Park	1977-07-26			45.6576°N 62.5085°W
Merigomish Harbour Provincial Park				45.630768°N 62.509117°W
Powells Point Provincial Park	1974-12-19			45.653055555556°N 62.559444444444°W
Rushtons Beach Provincial Park				45.752733333333°N 63.120833333333°W
Salt Springs Provincial Park	1972-06-13			45.545555555556°N 62.873333333333°W
Waterside Beach Provincial Park	1980-05-20			45.761111111111°N 62.775833333333°W

== Queens County ==
Name	Established	Coordinates
Camerons Brook Provincial Park	1981-06-23	44.333611111111°N 64.954722222222°W
Medway River Provincial Park		44.175717°N 64.662931°W
Mersey River Provincial Park		44.099016°N 64.868174°W
Port L’Hebert Provincial Park		43.8748°N 64.963733°W
Summerville Beach Provincial Park	1971-08-03	43.95°N 64.821388888889°W
Ten Mile Lake Provincial Park	1975-02-11	44.189444444444°N 64.833611111111°W
Thomas Raddall Provincial Park	1997-06-24	43.8392°N 64.9033°W

== Richmond County ==
Name	Established	Commons category	Picture	Coordinates
Battery Provincial Park	1972-03-28	St. Peters National Historic Site		45.655°N 60.869444444444°W
Burnt Island Provincial Park				45.58321°N 61.081957°W
Dundee Provincial Park				45.69745°N 61.105433°W
False Bay Provincial Park	2024-02-13			45.621147°N 61.012745°W
Hay Cove Provincial Park				45.740959°N 60.751047°W
Irish Cove Provincial Park				45.815017°N 60.692283°W
Lennox Passage Provincial Park	1985-03-12	Lennox Passage Provincial Park		45.5925°N 61.021666666667°W
Louisdale Provincial Park				45.60636°N 61.071657°W
Petit-de-Grat Provincial Park				45.498793°N 60.977898°W
Point Michaud Beach Provincial Park				45.592217°N 60.680083°W
Pondville Beach Provincial Park	1996-04-10			45.538333333333°N 60.977777777778°W

== Shelburne County ==
Name	Established	Coordinates
Baker Inlet Provincial Park		43.455425°N 65.588937°W
Blanche Provincial Park		43.527189°N 65.418305°W
Bulls Head Provincial Park		43.463856°N 65.575826°W
Cape Negro Provincial Park		43.55293°N 65.451565°W
Indian Fields Provincial Park	2015-12-29	44.047402°N 65.47225°W
Louis Head Provincial Park		43.756788°N 65.013528°W
Roseway Beach Provincial Park		43.603933°N 65.345907°W
Sable River Provincial Park		43.831388888889°N 65.075277777778°W
Sand Hills Beach Provincial Park	1976-05-11	43.529722222222°N 65.555277777778°W
The Islands Provincial Park	1972-04-25	43.765°N 65.335°W

== Victoria County ==
Name	Established	Commons category	Picture	Coordinates
Barra Forest Provincial Park Reserve				46.024826°N 60.797911°W
Bras d'Or Provincial Park				46.28782°N 60.415696°W
Cabots Landing Provincial Park	1974-12-19	Cabot Landing Provincial Park		46.9439°N 60.4668°W
Cape Smokey Provincial Park	1983-03-29			46.593888888889°N 60.381111111111°W
Dalem Lake Provincial Park	1977-01-25			46.2464°N 60.4322°W
MacNeils Vale Provincial Park				46.017878°N 60.813789°W
Plaster Provincial Park	1996-04-10			46.414444444444°N 60.475277777778°W
Ross Ferry Provincial Park				46.143867°N 60.583817°W
St. Anns Provincial Park				46.207222222222°N 60.623055555556°W
Trout Brook Provincial Park				46.095633°N 61.1409°W
Uisage Ban Falls Provincial Park		Uisge Ban Falls Provincial Park		46.2031°N 60.7783°W

== Yarmouth County ==
Name	Established	Coordinates
Chebogue Meadows Provincial Park		43.891258°N 66.054464°W
Ellenwood Lake Provincial Park	1971-11-23	43.927222222222°N 65.996944444444°W
Glenwood Provincial Park	1983-03-29	43.796666666667°N 65.875555555556°W
Ogden Lake Provincial Park		44.053674°N 65.919192°W
Pembroke Beach Provincial Park		43.861312°N 66.153316°W
Port Maitland Beach Provincial Park	1976-07-13	43.987222222222°N 66.1525°W
Tusket River Lookoff Provincial Park		43.864684°N 65.980411°W

== See also ==
- List of protected areas of Nova Scotia
