= Ogden Round Lake Wilderness Area =

Wilderness area in Guysborough County

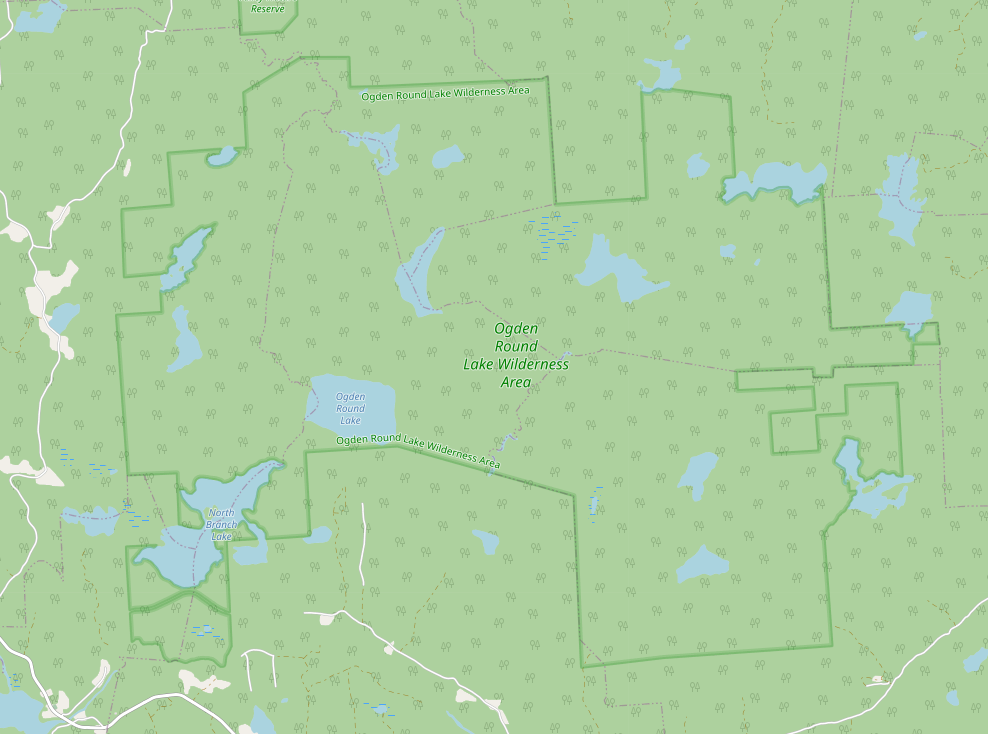
- Map of Ogden Round Lake Wilderness Area
- Interactive map of Ogden Round Lake Wilderness Area
- Location: Guysborough County, Nova Scotia
- Nearest city: Ogden, Nova Scotia
- Coordinates: 45°24′10.0″N 61°38′44.4″W
- Area: 5,606 hectares (13,850 acres)
- Established: 1998
- Governing body: Nova Scotia Department of Environment and Climate Change

Ogden Round Lake Wilderness Area is a wilderness area in Guysborough County, Nova Scotia, Canada, adjacent to Ogden. It is managed by the Nova Scotia Department of Environment and Climate Change. The wilderness area has good opportunity for fishing, hiking and exploration by canoes.

The wilderness area is 5,606 hectares (13,850 acres) in area. It has wetlands with stillwaters, unique landforms, and ecosystems. Ogden Round Lake Wilderness Area protects portions of eight watersheds. The area has deciduous forests, with local species.

It was established in 1998, and expanded 134 hectares (330 acres) in 2023.

Ogden Round Lake Wilderness Area can be accessed via minor spur routes from Nova Scotia Route 16. Off-highway vehicle use is permitted on 12 kilometres (7.5 mi) of designated trails.

== Geography and ecology ==
Ogden Round Lake Wilderness Area comprises 5,606 hectares (13,850 acres) in area. It has several wetlands with stillwaters. The wilderness area includes a variety of unique landforms and ecosystems in the Mulgrave Hills natural landscape. It protects portions of eight tertiary watersheds.

Ogden Round Lake Wilderness Area protects immature old-growth deciduous forests which is regionally significant, protecting habitat for local species.

== History ==
Ogden Round Lake Wilderness Area was established in 1998 under the Wilderness Areas Protection Act. Since then, it has expanded 134 hectares (330 acres) in 2023, providing connectivity between Roman Valley Nature Reserve.

== Routes and vehicle use ==
Ogden Round Lake Wilderness Area can be accessed via minor spur routes from Nova Scotia Route 16, as well as the Guysborough Nature Trail, also known as McAllister Bridge, whoch commences at Guysborough and terminates at St. Mary’s Nature Trail.

Off-highway vehicle use is permitted on 12 kilometres (7.5 mi) of designated trails managed under agreements with the Snowmobilers Association of Nova Scotia (SANS), All-terrain Vehicle Association of Nova Scotia (ATVANS), and Nova Scotia Offroad Riders Association (NSORRA) under agreements with Nova Scotia Department of Environment and Climate Change.

== See also ==
- List of protected areas of Nova Scotia
- Archibald Lake Wilderness Area
- St. Mary's River
