= Kelley River Wilderness Area =

Wilderness area in Nova Scotia

Coordinates: 45°35′16″N 64°24′38″W

- Location of Kelley River Wilderness Area
- Location: Nova Scotia
- Nearest city: Harrison Settlement
- Area: Approximately 21,000 hectares (52,000 acres)

Kelley River Wilderness Area is a protected wilderness area located in Cumberland County, Nova Scotia, Canada, adjacent to Harrison Settlement. It is the 39th wilderness to be established in Nova Scotia. Part of the wilderness area overlaps with the Chignecto Game Sanctuary. Hunting within the sanctuary is regulated under the Wildlife Act, which is administered by the Department of Natural Resources.

The area is suitable for a wide variety of outdoor activities, including hunting, sport fishing, canoeing, camping, hiking and sight-seeing.

== Geography ==
Kelley River Wilderness Area comprises just over 21,000 hectares (52,000 acres), being one of the largest wilderness areas in Nova Scotia. It straddles the watersheds of the Kelley River and Atkinson Brook and includes undeveloped sections of the River Hebert and Halfway River, as well as a tidal portion of the Maccan River.

=== Terrain ===
The terrain includes hills and flats but consists primarily of low ridges and imperfectly drained hummocks.

== Biodiversity ==
Kelley River Wilderness Area is an area of extensive, mature and older forest. It provides habitat for endangered species, such as wood turtle, Inner Bay of Fundy Salmon and the endangered mainland moose. Forests in the area are diverse, with alder swamps and mixedwood hills occurring alongside red maple floodplains and expanses of black and red spruce.

== History ==
Kelley River Wilderness Area was designated in 2012, with the addition of several small parcels in 2015.

=== Consultation ===
The province spent two years of review, public consultation and analysis to designate the wilderness area. Most respondents were generally supportive of wilderness protection in the area. The designations were announced on June 6, 2012.

== Management and protection ==
The area is managed by the Nova Scotia Department of Environment and Climate Change under the province’s Wilderness Areas Protection Act.

== See also ==
- List of protected areas of Nova Scotia
