= Portapique River Wilderness Area =

Wilderness area in Nova Scotia

Portapique River WIlderness Area
- Interactive map of Portapique River WIlderness Area
- Location: Nova Scotia
- Nearest city: Lornevale
- Coordinates: 45°30′23″N 63°44′12″W
- Area: 3,024 hectares (7,470 acres)
- Established: 1998

Portapique River Wilderness Area is a wilderness area in both Cumberland County and Colchester County, Nova Scotia, Canada, near Lornevale. It has outdoor recreation values, such as hunting, hiking, backcountry skiing, and snowshoeing. The area has high mineral potential, with some part of the area licensed for mineral exploration. Portapique River Wilderness Area was designated in 1998 and expanded by approximately 50% in 2022, adding 974 hectares (2,410 acres).

== Geography ==
Portapique River Wilderness Area comprises approximately 3,024 hectares (7,470 acres) of area. It is centered around the mixed forest canyon of Portapique River. The canyon and the highly dissected ravines of its tributaries cut through the ancient till-mantled rounded granite of the Cobequid Mountains.

== Biodiversity ==
Portapique River supports populations of the rare blacknose dace and Atlantic salmon, while mainland moose inhabit the surrounding terrestrial areas. Lichens are also common in the area, including species in the genus Lobaria, as well as Collema subflaccidum, Leptogium cyanescens and Parmeliella triptophylla. Less common lichen species include C. furfuraceum, C. nigrescens, Nephroma bellum, and Pseudocyphellaria crocata.

== Management and protection ==
Portapique River Wilderness Area is managed by the Nova Scotia Department of Environment and Climate Change under the province's Wilderness Areas Protection Act.

== See also ==
- List of protected areas of Nova Scotia
