= The Stillwaters Wilderness Area =

Wilderness area in Nova Scotia, Canada

Coordinates: 45°56′17″N 60°4′8″W

- Former name: Gull Lake
- Interactive map of The Stillwaters Wilderness Area
- Location: Cape Breton, Nova Scotia
- Nearest city: Louisbourg
- Area: 2,969 hectares (7,340 acres)
- Established: December 15, 2014
- Governing body: Nova Scotia Department of Environment and Climate Change

The Stillwaters Wilderness Area, formerly referred to as Gull Lake, is a protected wilderness area located in Cape Breton, Nova Scotia, Canada, adjacent to Louisbourg. The wilderness area was established in December 15, 2026 under the Wilderness Area Protection Act. It is governed by the Nova Scotia Department of Environment and Climate Change.

== Geography and ecology ==
The Stillwaters Wilderness Area comprises approximately 2,969 hectares (7,340 acres) in area. The wilderness area has a variety of forests, wetlands, lakes, and stillwaters adjacent to the Fortress of Louisbourg National Historic Site. The Stillwaters Wilderness Area contains a large peatland ecosystem with a mixed forest cover of young to mature spruce, fir and hardwood.

== Land use ==
The wilderness area offers a range of activities such as sport fishing, trapping, and backcountry canoeing. However, the water quality protection is a management priority. The Stillwaters Wilderness Area overlaps with the drinking water supply of Louisbourg, protecting the supply.

== Access ==
The Stillwaters Wilderness Area can be accessed by Nova Scotia Highway 22, as well as minor forest roads such as Park Service Road.

== See also ==
- List of protected areas of Nova Scotia
