= Raven Head Wilderness Area =

Wilderness area in Nova Scotia

Coordinates: 45°33′40″N 64°38′42″W

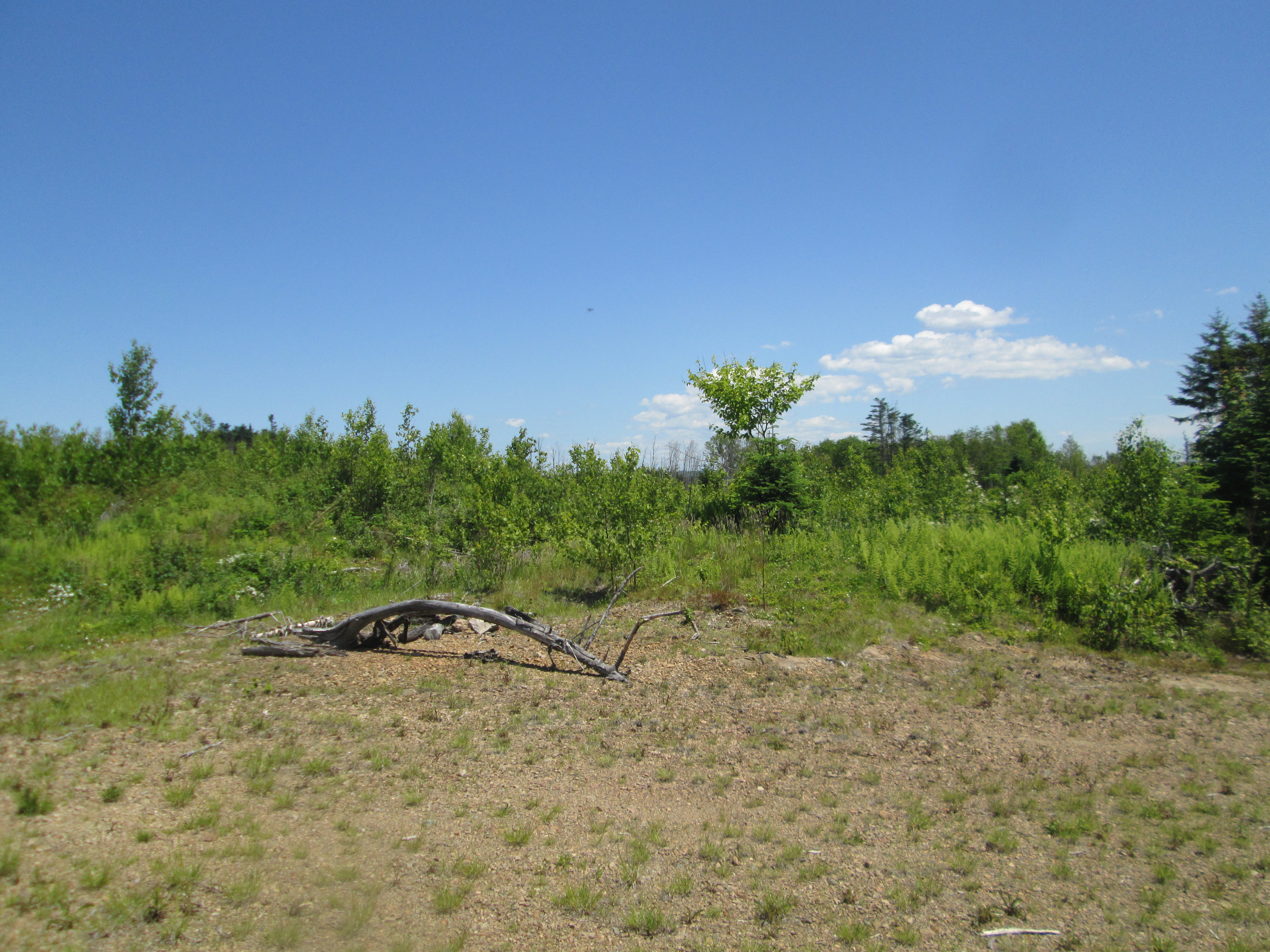
- Raven Head Wilderness Area
- Interactive map of Raven Head Wilderness Area
- Location: Cumberland County, Nova Scotia
- Nearest city: Sand River
- Area: 5,650 hectares (14,000 acres)
- Established: June 5th, 2012

Raven Head Wilderness Area is a protected wilderness area located in Cumberland County, Nova Scotia, Canada, near Sand River. It is the 40th wilderness area designated in Nova Scotia. The area has outdoor recreation values, such as recreation, camping, sportfishing, hunting, canoeing, education, research, and other activities. It has high petroleum potential, which overlaps with a regional agreement for petroleum exploration.

== Geography ==
Raven Head Wilderness Area comprises approximately 5,650 hectares (14,000 acres) of area. It protects 44 kilometres (27 mi) of undeveloped coast along the Bay of Fundy. The area contains fossil-bearing coastal cliffs, sheltered coves, beaches, small saltmarshes, and coastal forest. The northern end of the wilderness area, adjacent to Ragged Reef Point, extends almost to the Joggins Fossil Cliffs UNESCO World Heritage Site.

== Biodiversity ==
Raven Head Wilderness Area has forests consisting of hardwood, mixedwood, and softwood stands. The area provides habitat for the endangered mainland moose and other sensitive species.

== History ==
The addition of two coastal portions in 2015 expanded the wilderness area from 5,270 hectares (13,000 acres) to 5,650 hectares (14,000 acres).

=== Consultation ===
The province spent two years of review, public consultation and analysis to designate the wilderness area. Most respondents were generally supportive of wilderness protection in the area. It was designated in June 5th, 2012.

== Access ==
The Raven Head Wilderness Area is accessible via Nova Scotia Route 209. Forest access roads extending toward the beach at Pollys Flats, near Apple Head, are excluded from the wilderness area and remain open to public vehicular access.

== Management and protection ==
The Raven Head Wilderness Area is managed by the Nova Scotia Department of Environment and Climate Change under the province’s Wilderness Areas Protection Act.

== See also ==
- List of protected areas of Nova Scotia
- Bay of Fundy
