= Margaree River Wilderness Area =

Wilderness area in Nova Scotia

Coordinates: 46°29′59″N 60°53′4″W

Magaree River Wilderness Area
- Interactive map of Magaree River Wilderness Area
- Nearest city: Kingross
- Area: 8,990 hectares (22,200 acres)
- Established: December 3, 1998
- Governing body: Nova Scotia Department of Environment and Climate Change

The Margaree River Wilderness Area is a wilderness area located in Cape Breton, Nova Scotia, Canada, adjacent to Kingross. It protects the northeast Margaree River, a Canadian Heritage River. The wilderness area has a variety of recreational values, such as wilderness hiking, exploring, and fishing.

== Geography ==
The Margaree River Wilderness Area comprises approximately 8,990 hectares (22,200 acres) in area. The wilderness area helps protect water quality of the Margaree River. Steep slopes in the wilderness area lead to fast-flowing tributaries of the northeast Margaree River.

== Ecology ==
The Margaree River Wilderness Area provides habitat for fish, such as Atlantic salmon, brook trout, and gaspereau, as well as unique plants and animals. Mammals and birds include the Canada Lynx, American Marten, bicknell's thrush, and the rusty blackbird.

== History ==
The Margaree River Wilderness Area was established on December 3, 1998, and was expanded on November 25, 2015.

== Management and protection ==
The Raven Head Wilderness Area is managed by the Nova Scotia Department of Environment and Climate Change under the province's Wilderness Areas Protection Act.

== See also ==
- List of protected areas of Nova Scotia
- Margaree Salmon Association
