= Canso Coastal Barrens Wilderness Area =

Wilderness area in Nova Scotia

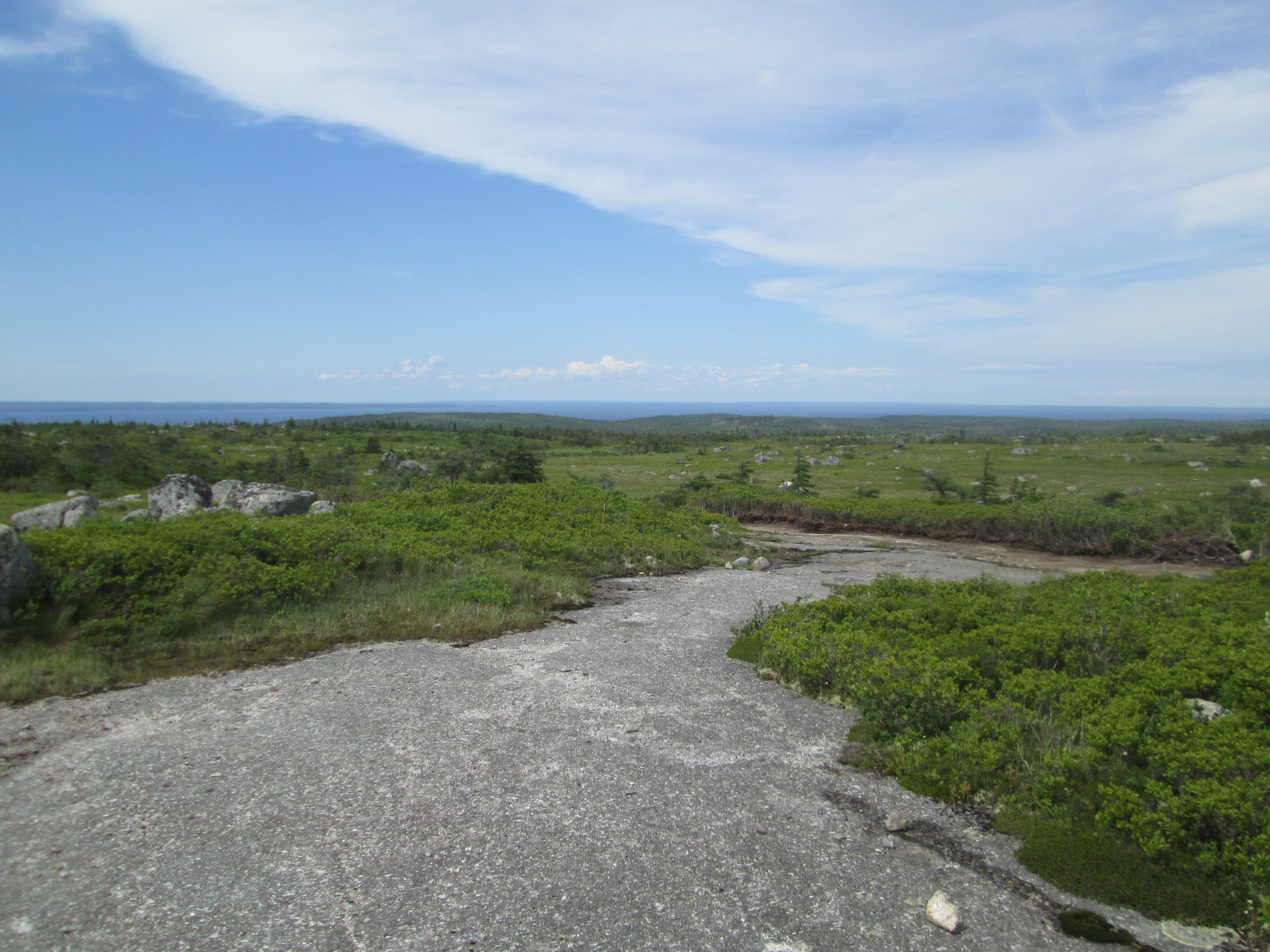
- Landscape of Canso Coastal Barrens Wilderness Area
- Interactive map of Canso Coastal Barrens Wilderness Area
- Location: Nova Scotia
- Nearest city: Cole Harbour
- Area: 8,026 hectares (19,830 acres)
- Established: January 23, 2004
- Governing body: Nova Scotia Department of Environment and Climate Change

Canso Coastal Barrens Wilderness Area is a protected wilderness area located in Guysborough County, Nova Scotia, Canada, adjacent to Cole Harbour. It is governed by the Nova Scotia Department of Environment and Climate Change.

== Geography ==
Canso Coastal Barrens Wilderness Area comprises approximately 8,026 hectares (19,830 acres) in area. The coastline of the area has many natural features, such as islands, inlets, bays, small salt marshes, peninsulas, harbours, lagoons, headlands, and beaches. The wilderness area has exposed, granite bedrock barrens and patches of mature coniferous forest.

== Ecology ==
Canso Coastal Barrens Wilderness Area provides habitat for several birds, seals, and whales. The wilderness area is also home to the arctic-alpine plants.

=== Birds ===
Canso Coastal Barrens Wilderness Area supports an variety of waterfowl, seabirds, and waders, including Eiders, Mergansers, Purple Sandpipers, and the Harlequin Duck. Breeding, migrating, or overwintering birds include the Blackpoll Warbler, Fox Sparrows and Boreal Chickadee.

== History ==
Canso Coastal Barrens Wilderness Area was established on January 23, 2004 and was expanded on November 4, 2025, by 238 hectares (590 acres) in Andrew Island, under the Wilderness Areas Protection Act.

== Access ==
Canso Coastal Barrent Wilderness Area can be accessed via Nova Scotia Trunk 16 and Nova Scotia Route 316, as well as minor forest trails.

== See also ==
- List of protected areas of Nova Scotia
- Bonnet Lake Barrens Wilderness Area
