= Terence Bay Wilderness Area =

Wilderness area in Nova Scotia

Coordinates: 44°33′5″N 63°40′41″W

- Interactive map of Terence Bay Wilderness Area
- Location: Nova Scotia
- Nearest city: Terence Bay
- Area: 4,551 hectares (11,250 acres)
- Established: January 26, 2004
- Governing body: Nova Scotia Department of Environment and Climate Change

Terence Bay Wilderness Area is a protected wilderness area in Halifax County, Nova Scotia, Canada, adjacent to Terence Bay, a rural community. The wilderness area is governed by the Nova Scotia Department of Environment and Climate Change under the province's Wilderness Areas Protection Act.

== Geography and ecology ==
Terence Bay Wilderness Area comprises approximately 4,551 hectares (11,250 acres) in area. There are vulnerable species in the area, such as rare lichens and the endangered mainland moose.

== History ==
Terence Bay Wilderness Area was established on January 26, 2004. The province acquired private parcels of land for addition to the wilderness area in 2004, 2015 and 2020.

== Access ==
Terence Bay Wilderness Area can be accessed via Nova Scotia Route 306 and Nova Scotia Route 333, as well as minor forest roads. Vehicle use inside the wilderness area is prohibited, with the exception of authorized maintenance operations.

== See also ==
- List of protected areas of Nova Scotia
