= Eigg Mountain-James River Wilderness Area =

Wilderness area in Nova Scotia

- Interactive map of Eigg Mountain-James River Wilderness Area
- Location: Antigonish County
- Coordinates: 45°40′25″N 62°8′53″W
- Area: 7,705 hectares (19,040 acres)
- Established: 2005

Eigg Mountain-James River Wilderness Area is a protected wilderness area in Antigonish County, Nova Scotia, Canada. It is located northwest of the town of Antigonish. The wilderness area is governed by Nova Scotia Department of Environment and Climate Change.

== Geography ==
Eigg Mountain-James River Wilderness Area comprises approximately 7,705 hectares (19,040 acres) of area. It is located in the Pictou-Antigonish Highlands, a rugged upland region characterized by rolling hills, forested slopes, and deeply incised river valleys. The wilderness area is situated within James River Watershed Protected Water Area, which provides drinking water to Antongish. Eigg Mountain-James River Wilderness Area was designated in 2005 and expanded in 2007, 2015, 2022 and again in 2024.

== Biodiversity ==
The undisturbed woodlands support a diverse variety of plant and animal species, creating a unique ecosystem. Habitat is suitable for species such as goshawk, mainland moose, and atlantic salmon. With well-drained hardwood dominated forests, mixed forest canyons, floodplains, and wetlands, the wilderness area protects the largest remaining contiguous tract of older forest in this part of Nova Scotia.

== Access ==
Eigg Mountain-James River Wilderness Area can be accessed via several major forest access roads, such as Connors Mountain Road, and Pleasant Valley Road. Bicycle use is permitted on routes managed by ATVANS. These routes, along with adjacent forest access roads, provide opportunities for accessing and experiencing the Eigg Mountain–James River Wilderness Area by bicycle.

== See also ==
- List of protected areas of Nova Scotia
- Eigg Mountain
