= Smuggler's Cove =

Smuggler's Cove, Smugglers Cove, or Smuggler Cove may refer to:

- Smuggler's Cove (bar), a tiki bar in San Francisco, California, or its eponymous 2016 book
- Smuggler's Cove (film), a 1948 American film
- Dead Man's Float, a 1980 Australian film also known as Smugglers Cove
- Smuggler's Cove Provincial Park, a provincial park in Nova Scotia, Canada
- Smuggler Cove Marine Provincial Park, a provincial park in British Columbia, Canada
- Smuggler Cove Shell Midden, an archeological site in Oregon
- Navagio Beach, sometimes referred to as Smugglers Cove, a cove on the Greek island of Zakynthos
- Mystery of Smugglers Cove. a 1980 Hardy Boys novel

== See also ==
- Smuggler (disambiguation)
- Cove (disambiguation)
