= Shelburne River Wilderness Area =

Wilderness area in Nova Scotia

Coordinates: 44°14′30″N 65°15′40″W

- Map of Shelburne River Wilderness Area
- Location: Queens County, Nova Scotia
- Nearest city: Indian Fields
- Area: 3,445 hectares (8,510 acres)
- Established: 2009
- Governing body: Nova Scotia Department of Environment and Climate Change

Shelburne River Wilderness Area is a protected wilderness area located in Queens County, Nova Scotia, Canada, adjacent to Indian Fields. It is governed by the Nova Scotia Department of Environment and Climate Change.

== Geography ==
Shelburne River Wilderness Area comprises a total of 3,445 hectares (8,510 acres). Wedged between the Tobeatic Wilderness Area and Kejimkujik National Park. The area contains the Shelburne River, Dunn Lake, Morton Lake, Harlow Lake, Irving Lake, Sand Lake, and Prince John Brook.

== Ecology ==
The wilderness area provides important habitat connectivity for wide-ranging mammals such as the endangered pine marten and mainland moose, aquatic species including brook trout, and old-forest-dependent species such as the northern goshawk.

== History ==
The Shelburne River was designated a Canadian Heritage River in 1997 under the federal Canada Heritage Rivers Program in recognition of its national significance. In 2009, the lower portion of its watershed was designated as the Shelburne River Wilderness Area, and in 2015 the protected area was expanded to its present extent.

=== Consultation ===
A public consultation was held to determine whether the Shelburne River should be designated as a wilderness Area. In March 2007, Premier MacDonald announced that he would purchase of more than 10,000 hectares of high-value conservation land from Bowater Mersey Paper Company Ltd. On 26 July 2007, the province announced that it would designate all of the lands, creating 30 new parks and protected areas, including the Shelburne River Wilderness Area.

== See also ==
- List of protected areas of Nova Scotia
