= Tracadie River Wilderness Area =

Wilderness area in Nova Scotia

- Interactive map of Tracadie River Wilderness Area
- Location: Nova Scotia
- Nearest city: North Intervale
- Area: 2,526 hectares (6,240 acres)
- Established: December 29, 2015
- Governing body: Nova Scotia Department of Environment and Climate Change

The Tracadie River Wilderness Area is a protected wilderness area located in Guysborough County, Nova Scotia, Canada, adjacent to North Intervale. It is governed by the Nova Scotia Department of Environment and Climate Change, under the Wilderness Areas Protection Act. The wilderness area was established on December 29, 2015.

== Geography ==
The Tracadie River Wilderness Area comprises approximately 2,526 hectares (6,240 acres) of area. The wilderness area contains five small freshwater lakes and several bogs with various sizes. The wilderness area is mixed with forests, lakes, streams, and wetlands. Good soils make the wilderness area more biologically productive.

== Ecology ==
The Tracadie River Wilderness Area protects the provincially endangered mainland moose. Rolling hills support extensive mature to old-growth sugar maple and yellow birch forests. On flat grounds, the forests are dominated with red and black spruce, fir, and white pine.

== Recreation ==
The Tracadie River Wilderness Area has plenty recreational values, such as walking, hunting, sportfishing, and trapping. Some parts of the wilderness area is suitable for cross country skiing.

== Access ==
The Tracadie River Wilderness Area can be accessed via North Intervale Road which cuts through the wilderness area.

== See also ==
- List of protected areas of Nova Scotia
