= Christies Beach =

Christies Beach may refer to

- Christies Beach, South Australia a southern suburb of Adelaide
- Christies Beach (Nova Scotia) a Provincial Protected Beach in Nova Scotia, Canada
