= Cloud Lake Wilderness Area =

Wilderness Area in Nova Scotia

Coordinates: 44°48′46″N 64°53′31″W

- Interactive map of Cloud Lake Wilderness Area
- Location: Nova Scotia
- Nearest city: Torbrook
- Area: 15,802 hectares (39,050 acres)
- Established: 2004
- Governing body: Environment and Climate Change of Nova Scotia

Cloud Lake Wilderness Area is a protected wilderness area located in both Annapolis County and Kings County, Nova Scotia, Canada, adjacent to Greenwood and Torbrook. It is governed by Environment and Climate Change of Nova Scotia. The area spans parts of the LaHave and Nictaux river watersheds.

== Geography ==
Cloud Lake Wilderness area comprises approximately 15,802 hectares (39,050 acres) of woodland, lakes and river within South Mountain.

=== Geology ===
Cloud Lake Wilderness Area landscape consists of an extensive upland region of exposed granite bedrock, characterized by diverse forested landforms, glacial deposits, numerous large scattered lakes, steep-sided streams, and wetlands. It contains representative examples of these features, such as kettle lakes, eskers, and bedrock-controlled lakes, as well as associated river and stream systems.

== History ==
Cloud Lake Wilderness Area was established in 2004, and was expanded in 2007 through the addition of a 507.1 hectares (1,253 acres) parcel acquired from Bowater Mersey, with a further expansion in 2015.

== Access ==
Cloud Lake Wilderness Area is accessible via Nova Scotia Route 10, as well as by forest roads such as Alton Road.

== See also ==
- List of protected areas of Nova Scotia
