= Tidney River Wilderness Area =

Wilderness area in Nova Scotia

- Interactive map of Tidney River Wilderness Area
- Location: Nova Scotia
- Area: 22,700 hectares (56,000 acres)
- Established: 1998
- Governing body: Nova Scotia Department of Environment and Climate Change

Tidney River Wilderness Area is a protected wilderness area located in both Shelburne County and Queens County, Nova Scotia, Canada, near Sable River. Most of the Tidney River watershed is in the wilderness area. The rivers of the wilderness area provide opportunities for canoeing, camping and angling, remote from the nearest settlements or maintained roads.

== Geography ==
Tidney River Wilderness Area comprises approximately 22,700 hectares (56,000 acres) in area. It protects a representative portion of the Sable River Basin. The flat, basin-like terrain surrounds long stretches of three major rivers: Tidney River, Sable River, and Broad River, that drain to the Atlantic Ocean.

== Ecology ==
The rivers are fed by slow-moving brooks that snake through dense forests of black spruce, fir, and tamarack, as well as red maple swales and extensive bogs. Species sensitive to human disturbance, such as the mainland moose, is home to the wilderness area. Parts of the area provide the right forest and climatic conditions to support over a dozen species of rare lichen, including the vole ears lichen and boreal felt lichen.

== History ==
Tidney River Wilderness Area was designated in 1998 and expanded in 2012. In 2015 additional lands were added at Misery Brook, the upper Sable and Broad Rivers and the head of West Brook.

== Access ==
Tidney River Wilderness Area can be accessed via Nova Scotia Route 103, as well as minor forest trails.

== Management and protection ==
The Raven Head Wilderness Area is managed by the Nova Scotia Department of Environment and Climate Change under the province’s Wilderness Areas Protection Act.

== See also ==
- List of protected areas of Nova Scotia
