= South Panuke Wilderness Area =

Wilderness area in Nova Scotia

Coordinates: 44°42′35″N 64°11′4″W

- Interactive map of South Panuke Wilderness Area
- Location: Nova Scotia
- Nearest city: East River
- Area: 7,191 hectares (17,770 acres)
- Established: 2015
- Governing body: Nova Scotia Department of Environment and Climate Change

South Panuke Wilderness Area is a protected wilderness area in both Halifax County, Hants County, and Lunenburg County, Nova Scotia, Canada, adjacent to East River. The wilderness area is governed by the Nova Scotia Department of Environment and Climate Change. It has several recreational values, such as canoeing, hiking, hunting, fishing, and trapping.

== Geography ==
South Panuke Wilderness Area comprises 7,191 hectares (17,770 acres) in area. Much of the wilderness area consists of hills, ridges, and hummocks. It represents a key opportunity to preserve a continuous, forested ecological corridor linking central and western mainland Nova Scotia.

== Ecology ==
=== Flora ===
South Panuke Wilderness Area has mature red spruce that is widespread, which is sometimes mixed with hemlock or white pine. Black spruce grows on poorly drained lands.

=== Fauna ===
South Panuke Wilderness Area protects endangered animals, such as mainland moose and martens. The wilderness area also protects birds and fish, including brook trout and the Atlantic salmon.

== Access ==
South Panuke Wilderness Area can be accessed via Nova Scotia Route 103 and Nova Scotia Trunk 14, as well as minor forest roads.

A 7 kilometres (4.3 mi) section of an off-highway vehicle trail traverses the wilderness area, following former forest access roads between Canaan and Timber Lake. The trail can also be accessed via bicycles.

== See also ==
- List of protected areas of Nova Scotia
