= Trout Brook Wilderness Area =

Protected area in Nova Scotia

Coordinates: 46°5′20″N 61°3′50″W

- Interactive map of Trout Brook Wilderness Area
- Location: Nova Scotia
- Nearest city: Trout Brook, Nova Scotia
- Area: 3,103 hectares (7,670 acres)
- Established: 1998
- Governing body: Nova Scotia Department of Environment and Climate Change

Trout Brook Wilderness Area is a protected wilderness area located in Inverness County, Nova Scotia, Canada, adjacent to Lake Ainslie and Wagmatcook First Nation. The wilderness area is governed by Nova Scotia Department of Environment and Climate Change.

The wilderness area has an area of 3,103 hectares (7,670 acres). Yellow birch and balsam fir can be found in the protected area.

== Geography ==
Trout Brook Wilderness Area comprises 3,103 hectares (7,670 acres) in area. The southeastern part, where there is uplands border Humes River Wilderness Area at a major forest access road near Lewis Mountain. The area features the Trout Brook canyon complex and rises into the Keppoch plateau.

The western edge of the wilderness area extends to Nova Scotia Highway 395, where trouts flow into Lake Ainsile. The lower part of Trout Brook, adjacent to the Highway 395 bridge, is a part of a Special Trout Management Area, which is a designated body of water managed with stricter rules to protect and enhance specific trout populations.

== Ecology ==
The plateau-forest made of yellow birch and balsam fir can be seen in hardwood-dominated lowlands. Balsam fir can be seen in higher elevation then yellow birch. The birch trees range from young to approximately 170 years old, while balsam firs are younger than the birch trees. Black spruces and fir occur in poorly drained flats. The landscape of Trout Brook Wilderness Area makes an ideal habitat for marten and the endangered Canada lynx.

== History ==
Trout Brook Wilderness Area was established in 1998, and expanded by almost 200 hectares (490 acres) in 2015. An additional 38 hectares (94 acres) has been added in 2023. The designation and land addition was operated via Wilderness Area Protection Act.

== Access ==
The wilderness area can be accessed via Nova Scotia Highway 395, as well as minor forest roads.

== See also ==
- List of protected areas of Nova Scotia
