= Lake Rossignol Wilderness Area =

Wilderness area in Nova Scotia

- Interactive map of Lake Rossignol Wilderness Area
- Location: Queens County
- Nearest city: Pleasantfield
- Area: 4,145 hectares (10,240 acres)
- Established: 1998
- Governing body: Environment and Climate Change of Nova Scotia

Lake Rossignol Wilderness Area is a protected wilderness area in Queens County, Nova Scotia, Canada, adjacent to Pleasantfield. It is named after Lake Rossignol, which is the largest freshwater lake in Nova Scotia. The wilderness area is located south of Kejimkujik National Park. It is managed by the Nova Scotia Department of Environment and Climate Change.

== Geography ==
Lake Rossignol Wilderness Area comprises approximately 4,145 hectares (10,240 acres) of area. It is situated within the transition zone between the LaHave Drumlins and Lake Rossignol Hills natural landscapes. The wilderness area consists of three named lakes: Big Rocky Lake, Little Rocky Lake, and Maclean Lake.

== Biodiversity ==
Lake Rossignol Wilderness Area’s terrain includes wetlands and poorly drained conifer forests, which are habitats for the endangered Eastern ribbon snake and Long's bulrush. Striking, cigar-shaped drumlins with productive hardwood and mixedwood forests occupy the northern portion of the area. Approximately 71% of the land is forested.

== History ==
The wilderness area was established in 1998. Several small parcels have been added to the wilderness area since, including 25 hectares at Bull Moose Lake in 2015, and 224 hectares at Maclean Lake.

In July 2006, the Protected Areas Branch of Nova Scotia Environment and Climate Change invited 34 scientists, students and volunteers to conduct a four-day bioblitz of the wilderness area. Biological sampling, including fungi, lichens, and turtles, has been conducted in the area.

== See also ==
- List of protected areas of Nova Scotia
