= Bowers Meadows Wilderness Area =

Wilderness Area in Nova Scotia

- Interactive map of Bowers Meadows Wilderness Area
- Location: Nova Scotia
- Nearest city: Beaverdam Lake
- Established: January 26, 2004
- Governing body: Nova Scotia Department of Environment and Climate Change

The Bowers Meadows Wilderness Area is a protected wilderness area in Shelburne County, Nova Scotia, Canada, near Beaverdam Lake. The wilderness area is governed by the Nova Scotia Department of Environment and Climate Change. It is northwest of the Quinns Meadow Natural Reserve.

== Geography ==
The Bowers Meadows Wilderness Area comprises 4,120 hectares (10,200 acres) of area. It protects terrestrial ecosystems of the Shelburne Headlands Natural Landscape. The wilderness area has large fen and bog-dominated wetlands that has developed in a post-glacial landscape characterized by glacial outwash deposits and low sinuous esker ridges. It also has salt marshes.

== History ==
The Bower Meadows Wilderness Area was established in January 26, 2004, and was expanded in November 4, 2025 by 48 hectares (120 acres), under the Wilderness Areas Protection Act.

== Recreation ==
The Bowers Meadows Wilderness Area offers a variety of opportunities, such as swimming, birdwatching, hunting, canoeing, hiking, camping, and clam digging.

== Access ==
The Bowers Meadows Wilderness Area can be accessed via Nova Scotia Route 103 and Nova Scotia Route 309, as well as minor forest roads.

== See also ==
- List of protected areas of Nova Scotia
