= New Chester =

New Chester may refer to one of the following places:

Canada

- New Chester, Nova Scotia

United States

- New Chester, Wisconsin, a town
