= Polletts Cove-Aspy Fault Wilderness Area =

Wilderness area in Nova Scotia

Coordinates: 46°54′26″N 60°36′13″W

- Interactive map of Polletts Cove-Aspy Fault Wilderness Area
- Location: Cape Breton
- Area: 27,230 hectares (67,300 acres)
- Established: 1999
- Governing body: Nova Scotia Department of Environment and Climate Change

The Polletts Cove-Aspy Fault Wilderness Area is a protected wilderness area located in Cape Breton, Nova Scotia, Canada, adjacent to Bay St. Lawrence and Pleasant Bay. The wilderness area is governed by the Nova Scotia Department of Environment and Climate Change.

== Geography ==
The Polletts Cove-Aspy Fault Wilderness Area is the largest wilderness area in Cape Breton, comprising approximately 27,230 hectares (67,300 acres) in area. The wilderness area has ancient faults, cirques, canyons, coastal mountain barrens, wetlands, talus slopes, and stunted spruce-fir plateau forests.

== Ecology ==
=== Flora ===
Arctic floras such as diapensia, blue mountain heather, pink crowberry, northern blueberry, and alpine bilberry grows on the wilderness area. Eastern waterfan, an aquatic endangered lichen, occurs in the canyon streams. Grasses include maidenhair and green spleenwort ferns.

=== Fauna ===
The Polletts Cove-Aspy Fault Wilderness Area protects the endangered bicknell’s thrush and piping plover. The wilderness area also provides habitat to shorebirds. Mammals include the Canada lynx and mainland moose.

== History ==
The Polletts Cove-Aspy Fault Wilderness Area were designated in 1999 under the Wilderness Areas Protection Act. It was expanded by 89 hectares (220 acres) in 2015.

== Access ==
The Polletts Cove-Aspy Fault Wilderness Area can be accessed via Nova Scotia Route 30, as well as minor forest roads.

== See also ==
- List of protected areas of Nova Scotia
