= Elgg (disambiguation) =

Elgg may refer to:

- Elgg, a municipality in the district of Winterthur in the canton of Zürich in Switzerland
  - Elgg railway station
  - Elgg Castle
- Elgg (software), an open source social networking platform

== See also ==
- Eigg (disambiguation)
