= Five Bridge Lakes Wilderness Area =

Wilderness area in Nova Scotia

Coordinates: 44°36′33″N 63°48′21″W

- Interactive map of Five Bridge Lakes Wilderness Area
- Location: Halifax County
- Area: 8,626 hectares (21,320 acres)
- Established: October 18, 2011
- Governing body: Nova Scotia Department of Environment and Climate Change

The Five Bridge Lakes Wilderness Area is a protected wilderness area in Halifax County, Nova Scotia, Canada, near Upper Tantallon. The wilderness area is managed by the Nova Scotia Department of Environment and Climate Change under the province's Wilderness Areas Protection Act. It helps to normalize air quality and protecting watersheds.

== Geography ==
The Five Bridge Lakes Wilderness Area comprises 8,626 hectares (21,320 acres) in area. The wilderness area has many forests, barrens, wetlands, rivers, and lakes.

== History ==
The Five Bridge Lakes Wilderness Area was established on October 18, 2011.

=== Consultation ===
The consultation to create the wilderness area lasted two years and resulted in its creation. In total, 121 votes were submitted. 85 people supported the designation of the proposed wilderness area, while six people opposed it. Private lands are not being considered as part of this wilderness area. However, some respondents advocated to add the private lands to the wilderness area.

Wilderness areas protect our natural spaces, and the wildlife within them. With the designation of this wilderness area, families can continue to participate in outdoor activities like hiking, running, canoeing and fishing, close to the city.

— Sterling Belliveau,

== Access ==
The Five Bridge Lakes Wilderness Area can be accessed via Nova Scotia Route 103 and Nova Scotia Route 333, as well as forest trails, such as Old Saint Margarets Bay Road.

== Recreation ==
The Five Bridge Lakes Wilderness Area offers a variety of opportunities for recreations, including hiking, running, canoeing, trout fishing, hunting, and nature appreciation. It is also suitable for education and research.

=== Bluff Wilderness Hiking Trail ===
The Bluff Wilderness Hiking Trail is a hiking trail inside the wilderness area. The hiking trail is more than 30 kilometres (19 mi) long. Bicycles or motorized vehicles are not permitted on The Bluff Trail. The hiking trail is managed by Woodens River Watershed Environmental Organization by an agreement with Nova Scotia Department of Environment and Climate Change.

== See also ==
- List of protected areas of Nova Scotia
