= Eigg (disambiguation) =

Eigg is a Scottish Island.

Eigg may also refer to:

- Eigg Mountain: a highland region in Antigonish County, Nova Scotia, Canada
- MV Eigg, a 1974 car ferry built for Caledonian MacBrayne

== See also ==
- Egg (disambiguation)
