= Pleasantfield, Nova Scotia =

Community in Nova Scotia, Canada

Coordinates: 44°14′28.55″N 64°54′18.6″W

Pleasantfield in Nova Scotia

Pleasantfield is a community in the Canadian province of Nova Scotia, located in the Region of Queens Municipality.

== See also ==
- Lake Rossignol Wilderness Area
