= Anthony Provincial Park =

Provincial park in Nova Scotia, Canada

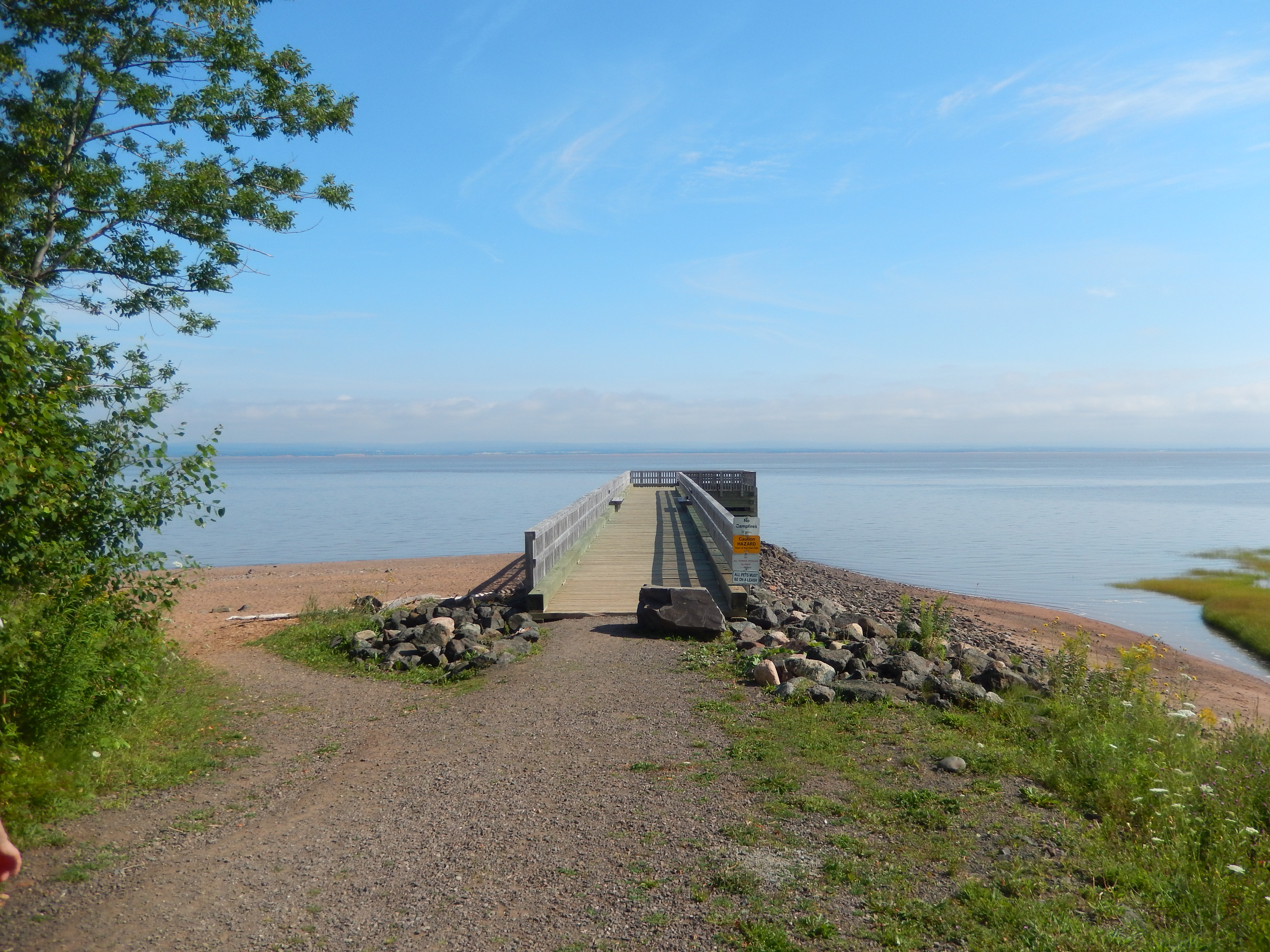
- Anthony Provincial Park
- Interactive map of Anthony Provincial Park
- Type: Provincial park
- Location: Hants County, Nova Scotia, Canada
- Nearest town: Selma
- Coordinates: 45°18′55″N 63°36′21″W
- Area: 7.74 hectares (19.1 acres)
- Created: December 19, 1974
- Operator: Parks and Recreation Division, Nova Scotia Department of Natural Resources
- Open: May 17 to October 14
- Status: Designated; Operational
- Website: Anthony Provincial Park

Anthony Provincial Park is a coastal provincial park in the Canadian province of Nova Scotia, located in Hants County. The primary feature of the park is the wharf overlooking the Cobequid Bay. The park was established by Order in Council (OIC 74-1379) on December 19, 1975.

Historically, the wharf at present-day Anthony Provincial Park was used for shipping pulpwood to Hantsport, and the Brown and Anthony shipyard once constructed wooden vessels nearby. The park is popular for fishing and is known to be home to a significant population of shorebirds, marsh and uplands birds. The area including Anthony Provincial Park along the Bay of Fundy shore is known for being the site of the highest tides in the world, and American scientists visited what is now the park to study the tides in 1943.

== See also ==
- List of provincial parks in Nova Scotia
- Burntcoat, Nova Scotia
