= Archibald Lake Wilderness Area =

Wilderness area in Nova Scotia

- Location of Archibald Wilderness Area
- Location: Guysborough County, Nova Scotia
- Nearest city: Sherbrooke, Nova Scotia
- Coordinates: 45°12′27″N 61°57′06″W
- Area: 687 hectares (1,700 acres)
- Established: 28 August 2023
- Governing body: Nova Scotia Department of Environment and Climate Change

Archibald Lake Wilderness Area (IPA: /ˈɑːrtʃɪbɔːld leɪk ˈwɪldɚnəs ˈɛəriə/) is a protected wilderness area in Guysborough County, Nova Scotia, Canada, near Sherbrooke. The wilderness area is governed by the Nova Scotia Department of Environment and Climate Change.

== Geography ==
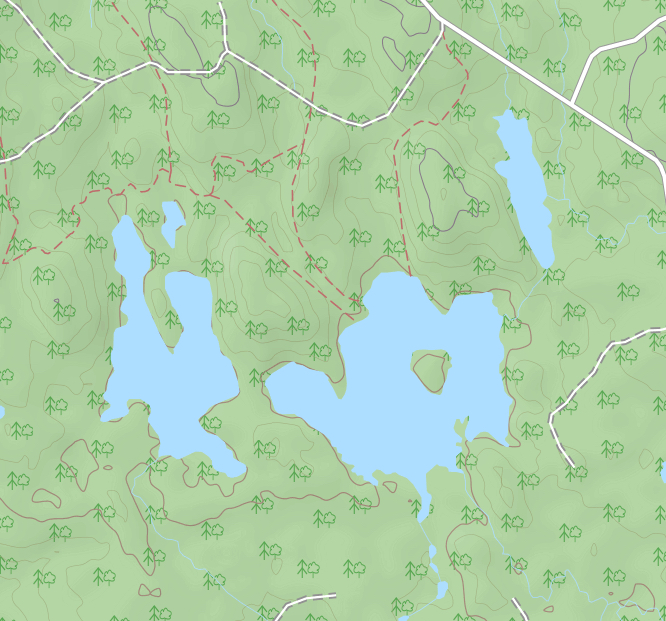
Map of Archibald Lake Wilderness Area

Archibald Lake Wilderness Area comprises a total of 687 hectares (1,700 acres). The wilderness area has 3 lakes: Archibald Lake, MacDonald Lake, and Rocky Lake, and surrounded by well drained hardwood drumlins, wetlands, and old forests. About 10 hectares around Archibald Brook is subject to mineral exploration rights. The wilderness area helps maintain water quality and flow in Archibald Brook, a tributary of St. Marys River.

== Ecology ==
Archibald Lake Wilderness Area identified 37 rare species, including 7 species being endangered. The wilderness area is home to the Mainland Moose, Blue Felt Lichen, Canada Warbler, Common Nighthawk, Olive-Sided Flycatcher, Black-Saddle Pelt Lichen, and Green Starburst Lichen. It is also home to the Atlantic Salmon, Brook Trout, Gaspereau, American Eels, and Eastern Pearlshell Mussels. Approximately 300 hectares of the wilderness area is old hardwood forest on drumlins.

== History ==
Archibald Lake Wilderness Area was proposed in early 2020. A total of 226 votes were submitted. 53 respondents indicated they live locally or have strong family ties to the area, 129 votes indicated strong support for protection, while 97 votes indicated no support for protection on the area. Agriculture Minister and MLA for Guysborough-Tracadie Greg Morrow made the announcement on August 28, 2023, declaring the existence of Archibald Lake Wilderness Area.

Today is a great day for the people of Guysborough County and all Nova Scotians, and I am thrilled to make this announcement which will help ensure a sustainable and healthy future for our province, our people and our economy. The Archibald Lake area – with its lakes, hardwood hills, and old-growth forest – is a beautiful, scenic and pristine natural gem. By protecting it forever, we are ensuring generations of Nova Scotians will be able to experience and benefit from all it has to offer including the health benefits of spending time in natural areas.

== Cochrane Hill Gold Project ==
A proposed gold mining project known as the Cochrane Hill Gold Project is located near the Archibald Lake Wilderness Area. The project entered the federal environmental assessment process in 2018, during which public comments were invited on its potential environmental effects. However, environmental concerns were raised in part due to proposals involving the use of nearby water resources. The federal assessment process was later terminated after the project failed to submit required information within the given time. In 2023, the designation of the Archibald Lake Wilderness Area placed the surrounding land under legal protection, prohibiting mining and other industrial activities near its boundary.

== Access and recreation ==
Archibald Lake Wilderness Area can be accessed by Nova Scotia Route 7 and Indian River Road, near the rural community of Stillwater. Near the wilderness area, there is a hiking trail to the lake and the wilderness area.

== See also ==
- List of protected areas of Nova Scotia
- Nova Scotia Route 211
