= Smuggler (disambiguation) =

A smuggler is a person involved in the clandestine transportation of goods or persons.

Smuggler may also refer to:

== Art, entertainment, and media ==
=== Films ===
- Smuggler (1996 film), a 1996 Bollywood film starring Dharmendra
- Smuggler (2011 film), Japanese live-action film based on the manga
- Smugglers (2023 film), Korean film
- The Smuggler (1911 film), a 1911 American silent film William Garwood, Florence La Badie, Harry Benham
- The Smuggler (1912 film), French film with René Navarre
- The Smuggler (2014 film), American film with James Kyson
- The Smuggler or The Mule (2014 film), alternative DVD title for 2014 Australian film
- The Smugglers (1916 film), American silent film starring Donald Brian
- The Smugglers, US title of the British 1947 film The Man Within
- The Smugglers (1967 film) (French: Les Contrebandières), a 1967 French film
- The Smugglers (1971 film) (Italian: L'amante dell'Orsa Maggiore), 1971 Italian film

=== Literature ===
- Smuggler (character), a Marvel Comics superhero
- Smuggler (manga), a Japanese manga series by Shohei Manabe
- Smuggler (2016), the memoir of drug smuggler William Roger Reaves, who introduced Barry Seal to the Medellin Cartel
- The Smugglers (1831), novel by John Banim
- The Smugglers (1913), novel by S. R. Crockett
- The Smugglers (1909), by Charles George Harper
- The Smugglers (1966), by Barbara Kimenye
- The Smugglers (1999), by Iain Lawrence
- The Smugglers (1978), by Ruth Manning-Sanders
- The Smugglers (1974), by Paul Petersen

=== Television ===
- Smuggler, a 1981 miniseries starring Oliver Tobias
- The Smugglers (Doctor Who), a serial in the long-running British science fiction series Doctor Who

=== Other uses in arts, entertainment, and media ===
- The Smugglers (band), a Canadian indie rock band
- The Smugglers, an 1882 musical scored by John Philip Sousa
- Smuggler (company), an American film, theatre, TV, commercial, and music video production company

=== Other uses ===
- Smuggler (horse), an American Champion Thoroughbred racing mare

== See also ==
- Coyote (person)
- Mule (smuggling)
- Smuggler's Cove
