= Margaree Salmon Association =

- Margaree Salmon Association
- Purpose: Wildlife Conservation
- Location: Margaree, Nova Scotia
- Official language: English
- Board of directors: President Paul MacNeil, Vice President Paddy Poirier, Vice President Julia Marie Campbell, Treasurer Bill Haley, Secretary Peter Mancini, Roderick Bird, Keith Christmas, Skyler Jeddore, Eugene Leblanc, Greg Lovely, Blair Pardy, Joel Robinson, John Stinson, Gioia Usher
- Affiliations: Atlantic Salmon Conservation Foundation, Margaree Fish Hatchery,Unama'ki Institute of Natural Resources
- Website: https://www.margareesalmon.ca/

The Margaree Salmon Association is a wildlife conservation group that was established in 1982 in Margaree, Cape Breton Island, Nova Scotia, Canada. The association is a nonprofit organization, that dedicates itself to restoration ecology, through conservation, protection and enhancement of spawning and rearing habitat of the salmonid lineage; specific to the Atlantic salmon and trout species. The association engineers habitat enhancing structures into tributaries of the Margaree River watershed. The Margaree River is public domain, attracting yearly visits by anglers near and far.

== History ==
The Association was involved in the nomination and designation of the Margaree River-Lake Ainslie watershed; as a Canadian Heritage Rivers System. As well, the Association works in collaboration with the Inland Fisheries Division of the Nova Scotia Department of Fisheries and Aquaculture and Fisheries and Oceans Canada, to assist with scientific study in areas of broodstock collection, stock assessment and water quality sampling.

== Partnerships ==
The Margaree Salmon Association works in partnership with the Atlantic Salmon Conservation Foundation and the NSLC Adopt-A-Stream Program to carry out habitat improvement initiatives.

== See also ==
- Margaree River Wilderness Area
