= Wallace Bay National Wildlife Area =

National Wildlife Area in Nova Scotia

- IUCN category VI (protected area with sustainable use of natural resources)
- Interactive map of Wallace Bay National Wildlife Area
- Location: Nova Scotia
- Nearest city: Kerrs Mill
- Area: 580.5 hectares (1,434 acres)
- Established: 1980

Wallace Bay National Wildlife Area is a 580.5 hectares (1,434 acres) National Wildlife Area located in Cumberland County, Nova Scotia, Canada, adjacent to Kerrs Mill and Wallace. The wildlife area is protected and managed in accordance with the Wildlife Area Regulations. The wildlife area was established in 1980.

The wilderness area includes approximately 100 hectares (250 acres) of woodland and some oldfields. Birds in the area include northern pintail, mallard, redhead, sora, osprey, and common tern.

Activities such as wildlife viewing, hiking, swimming, picking edible plants and mushrooms, boat launching and landing, motorized boating, non-motorized boating, cross country skiing, and snowshoeing are allowed. Waterfowl hunting and muskrat trapping is also allowed.

== Geography ==
Wallace Bay National Wildlife Area comprises approximately 580.5 hectares (1,434 acres) in area, with 186 hectares (460 acres) of controlled water level freshwater wetlands constructed by Ducks Unlimited Canada in 1973. The wilderness area includes about 100 hectares (250 acres) of woodlands, and some oldfields.

== Birds ==
Eight species of waterfowls breed regularly on the wildlife area, such as green-winged teal, American black duck, northern pintail, and blue-winged teal. Birds that are found on the area, but not annually, include wood duck, mallard, and redhead. The shallow wetlands provide nesting habitat for several regularly breeding marsh birds including the pied-billed grebe, American bittern, sora, American coot, and Wilson's snipe. Other species observed on occasion and presumed to breed irregularly include least bittern, Virginia rail, marsh wren, osprey, and common tern.

== Activities ==
The wilderness area has a variety of activities, such as wildlife viewing, hiking, swimming, picking edible plants and mushrooms, boat launching and landing, motorized boating (with less than 10 horsepower), non-motorized boating, cross country skiing, and snowshoeing. Waterfowl hunting and muskrat trapping is allowed.

== Access ==
Wallace Bay National Wildlife Area can be accessed via Nova Scotia Trunk 6, as well as minor forest roads, such as North Wallace Road and Wallace Bay National Wildlife Area Trail.

== See also ==
- List of protected areas of Nova Scotia
