= Big Glace Bay Lake National Wildlife Area =

Protected area in Nova Scotia, Canada

Coordinates: 46°10′N 59°56′W

- Big Glace Bay Lake Migratory Bird Sanctuary
- Interactive map of Big Glace Bay Lake National Wildlife Area
- Location: Nova Scotia
- Nearest city: Glace Bay
- Area: 394 hectares (970 acres)
- Established: 2022 July

Big Glace Bay Lake National Wildlife Area, also known as Big Glace Bay Lake Migratory Bird Sanctuary, is a 394 hectares (970 acres) National Wildlife Area and a Migratory Bird Sanctuary located in Cape Breton, Nova Scotia, Canada, adjacent to Glace Bay. It is protected and managed in accordance with the Wildlife Area Regulations.

The protected area is centered around Big Glace Bay Lake, a large body of brackish water that covers the majority of the sanctuary.

The area protects a variety of birds, such as Canada geese, American black ducks and piping plovers.

Designated in July 2022, the area was previously heavily industrialized, formerly hosting a coal-fired power plant and a heavy water plant.

== Geography ==
Big Glace Bay Lake National Wildlife Area comprises approximately 394 hectares (970 acres) in area. It has a body of water that takes a majority of the area, named Big Glace Bay Lake. A 1.5 kilometres (0.93 mi) sand and gravel beach separates the ocean from the salt marsh and intertidal flats. The water in the area contains brackish water, which is a combination of salt and fresh water.

The area has 5% of gravel beaches and salt marshes each, 23% of mixed woodland, and 67% of eelgrass flats.

== Birds ==
Key birds in the area include American black ducks, Canada geese, common goldeneyes, buffleheads, piping plovers, common terns, and willets. The water combination of salt and fresh water makes it particularly attractive to waterfowl.

== History ==
Big Glace Bay Lake National Wildlife Area was designated in July 2022. However, before the designation, a coal-fired power plant once sat at the western end of the estuary. The Seaboard power plant opened in 1930 to supply power to Cape Breton, but it was disestablished in the 1980s. Adjacent to it, a heavy water plant was built in the 1960s to produce heavy water for nuclear reactors, but it was also disestablished in the 1980s. Later, the federal government completed a cleanup of the site in 2012.

During the process of creating the area, ECCC acquired two additional patches of land to ensure a conservation buffer exists at the western end of Big Glace Bay Lake.

== Activity ==
The wilderness area has a variety of activities, such as wildlife viewing, hiking, swimming, picking edible plants and mushrooms, boat launching and landing, motorized boating (with less than 10 horsepower), non-motorized boating, cross country skiing, and snowshoeing.

== Access ==
Big Glace Bay Lake National Wildlife Area can be accessed by Nova Scotia Route 255 and Donkin Highway.

== See also ==
- List of protected areas of Nova Scotia
- Donkin, Nova Scotia
- Birch Grove, Nova Scotia

== External link ==
- Big Glace Bay Lake National Wildlife Area - OpenStreetMap
