= Bonnet Lake Barrens Wilderness Area =

Wilderness area in Nova Scotia

Bonnet Lake Barren Wilderness Area
- Interactive map of Bonnet Lake Barren Wilderness Area
- Nearest city: Cole Harbour and Upper Whitehead
- Coordinates: 45°16′28.3″N 61°19′43.6″W
- Area: 10,387 hectares (25,670 acres)
- Governing body: Environment of Nova Scotia

Bonnet Lake Barrens Wilderness Area is a near-coastal wilderness area in Guysborough County, Nova Scotia, Canada, adjacent to Cole Harbour and Upper Whitehead. It is governed by Environment and Climate Change of Nova Scotia. The wilderness area is measured 190.14 kilometres (118.15 mi) from Halifax, and 153.65 kilometres (95.47 mi) from Truro.

== Geography ==
Bonnet Lake Barrens Wilderness Area is approximately 10,387 hectares (25,670 acres) in area. The wilderness area has many wind-swept granite barrens, semi-barrens and coastal spruce-fir forests. It also has ecologically sensitive raised bogs, rare plants, and an array of lakes and waterways, including ponds, still-waters, brooks and streams.

The wilderness area contains unique, crescent shaped beaches, originally formed from glacial debris.

== History ==
Bonnet Lake Barrens Wilderness Area was established on January 23, 2004, and has expanded 20.23 hectares (50.0 acres) in March 2011, and another 258 hectares (640 acres) in 2025.

== Access ==
Bonnet Lake Barrens Wilderness Area can be accessed by Marine Drive in Nova Scotia Route 316. It can be also accessed via a cycling spur route, starting from Larry's River to Cape Breton.

== See also ==
- List of protected areas of Nova Scotia
