= Ogden, Nova Scotia =

Community in Nova Scotia, Canada

Coordinates: 45°20′45.57″N 61°37′54.94″W

Ogden in Nova Scotia

Ogden is a small community in the Canadian province of Nova Scotia, located in the Municipality of the District of Guysborough in Guysborough County.
