= MacCormack Provincial Park =

Provincial park in Nova Scotia, Canada

- Interactive map of MacCormack Provincial Park
- Type: Provincial Park
- Location: 2481 St. Columba Rd, Iona, Nova Scotia
- Nearest town: Iona, Nova Scotia
- Coordinates: 45°57′50″N 60°48′37″W
- Area: 4.43 hectares (10.9 acres)
- Open: dawn to dusk, from May 15 to October 12
- Status: Undesignated / Operational / Wayside Park
- Website: parks.novascotia.ca/park/maccormack

MacCormack Provincial Park is a small picnic park overlooking the Bras d'Or Lake, in the community of Plaster Cove (near Iona, Nova Scotia), in the Canadian province of Nova Scotia, located in Victoria County on Cape Breton Island. The park entrance is on St. Columba Road, just 0.3 kilometres (0.19 mi) north of Iona, Nova Scotia.

As one of few public access points to Bras d’Or Lake the park provides beach access with opportunities for beach walking and carry-in boating, and offers picnic tables scattered through a softwood forest overlooking Plaster Cove. There is a public wharf and a beach protected under the Beaches Act adjacent to the park.
