= Arisaig Provincial Park =

Provincial park in Nova Scotia, Canada

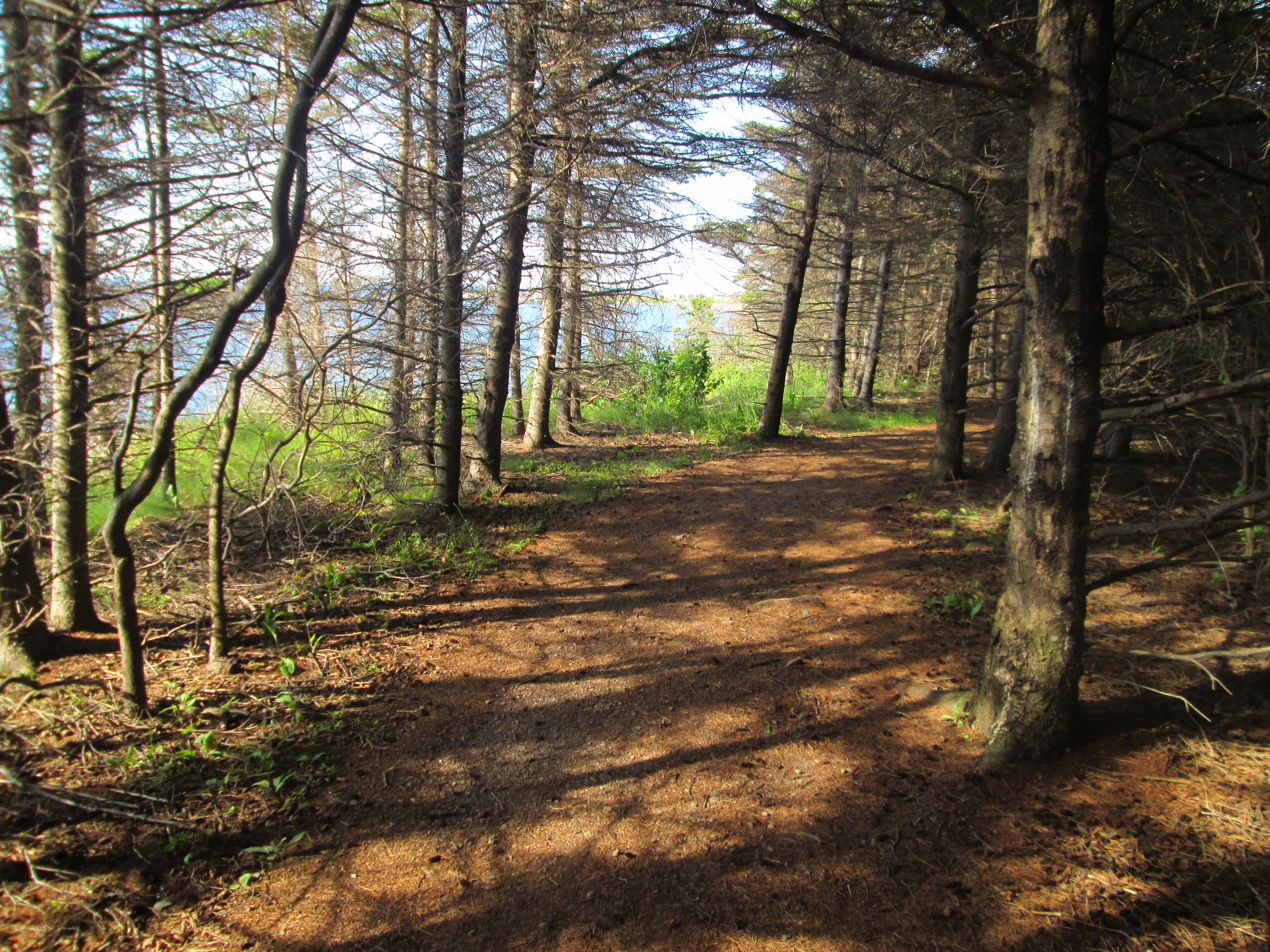
- View of a trail, July 2018

- Location within Nova Scotia
- Location: Nova Scotia, Canada
- Nearest city: Antigonish
- Coordinates: 45°45′14″N 062°10′13″W
- Governing body: Nova Scotia Department of Natural Resources and Renewables

Arisaig Provincial Park is a provincial park located in Antigonish, Nova Scotia, Canada.
