= Eigg Mountain =

Mountain in Nova Scotia, Canada

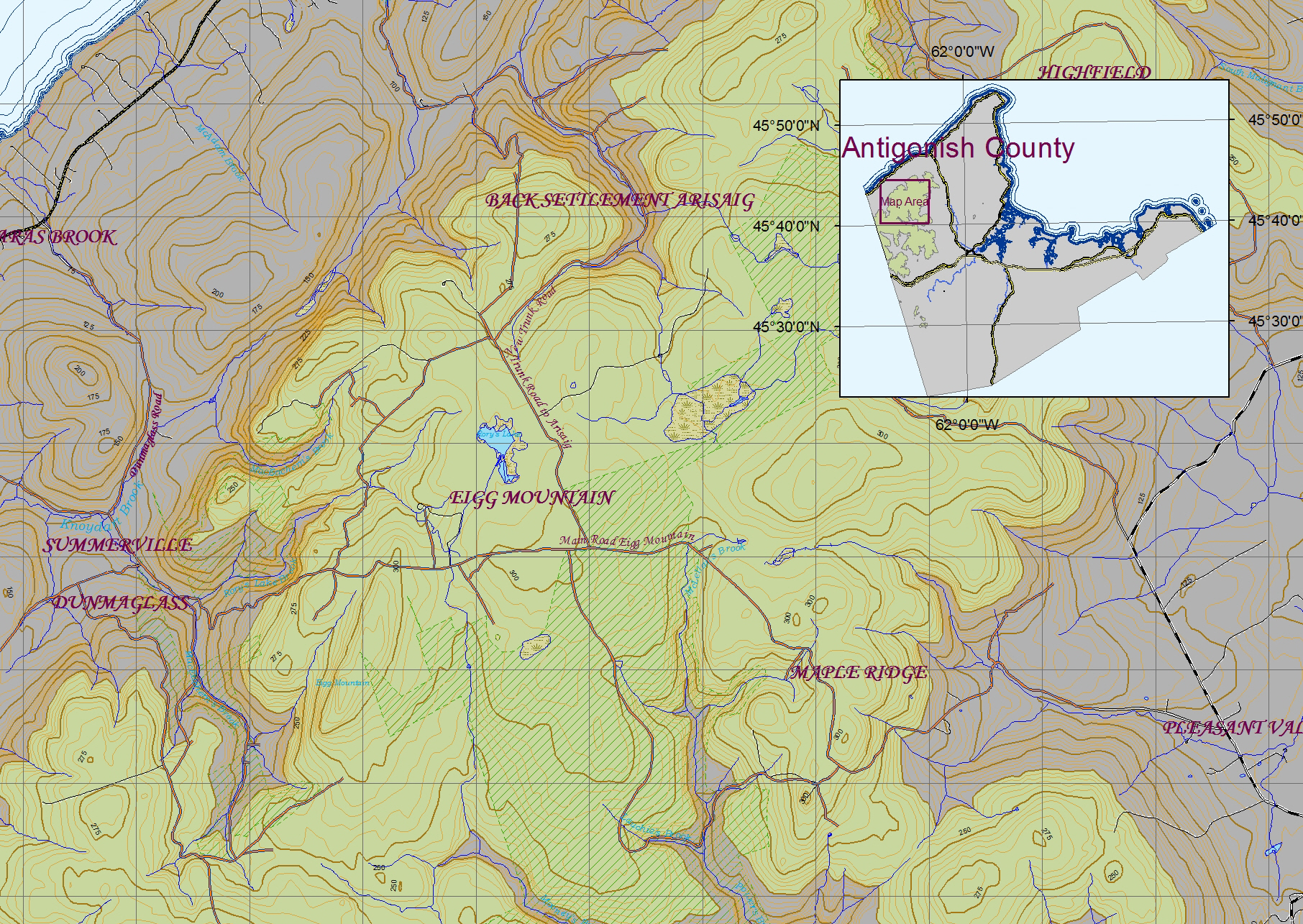
- Map of Eigg Mountain showing highlands area in green
- Interactive map of Eigg Mountain
- 45°42′41″N 62°8′57″W
- Location: Antigonish County, Nova Scotia, Canada

Eigg Mountain is a high plateau (between 225 and 300 metres above sea level), part of the highlands of Antigonish County, Nova Scotia, Canada.

Originally used as winter hunting grounds by the Mi’kmaq people, Eigg Mountain was settled and farmed in the early nineteenth century by immigrants from Ireland and the Scottish Highlands. The place takes its name from the Isle of Eigg in western Scotland where some of the first settlers originated. Farming conditions were difficult at this high elevation. Winters were longer and the snow-cover deeper than in lowland areas. The soil was rocky and thin. Crop failures were reported in the 1890s. The school was closed in 1914. The entire settlement was abandoned shortly thereafter. The history of Eigg Mountain settlement is documented on an interactive online map.

Eigg Mountain has been logged continuously since the eighteenth century, and logging is now the main economic activity there. People still hunt on Eigg Mountain as the Mi’kmaq did centuries ago; however the caribou are gone and the endangered mainland moose is now a protected species. In the summer people enjoy the area by hiking, cycling and exploring with all-terrain vehicles; in the winter by snowshoe, ski and snowmobile. A portion of Eigg Mountain was protected in 2003 as part of the Eigg Mountain-James River Wilderness Area.

The term Eigg Mountain is also used to refer to a peak that rises above the Eigg Mountain plateau to an elevation of 321.9 metres (Co-ordinates: 45°41′23″N 62°10′33″W) and is the site of a horizontal control point or triangulation station.

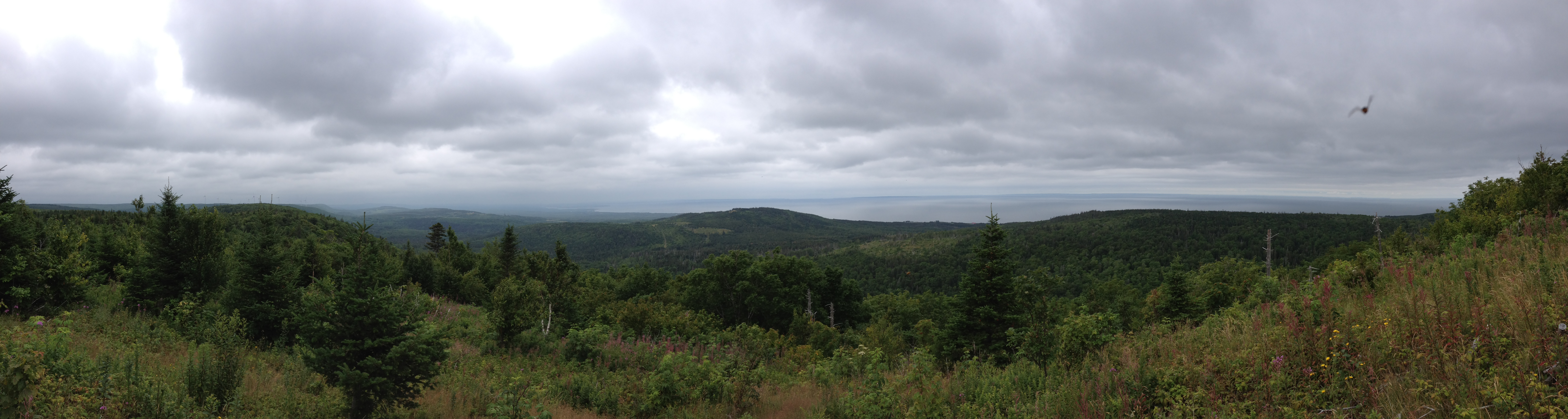
View from a former field on the northwest brow of Eigg Mountain looking towards Prince Edward Island. 45°42′59.5″N 62°10′47″W

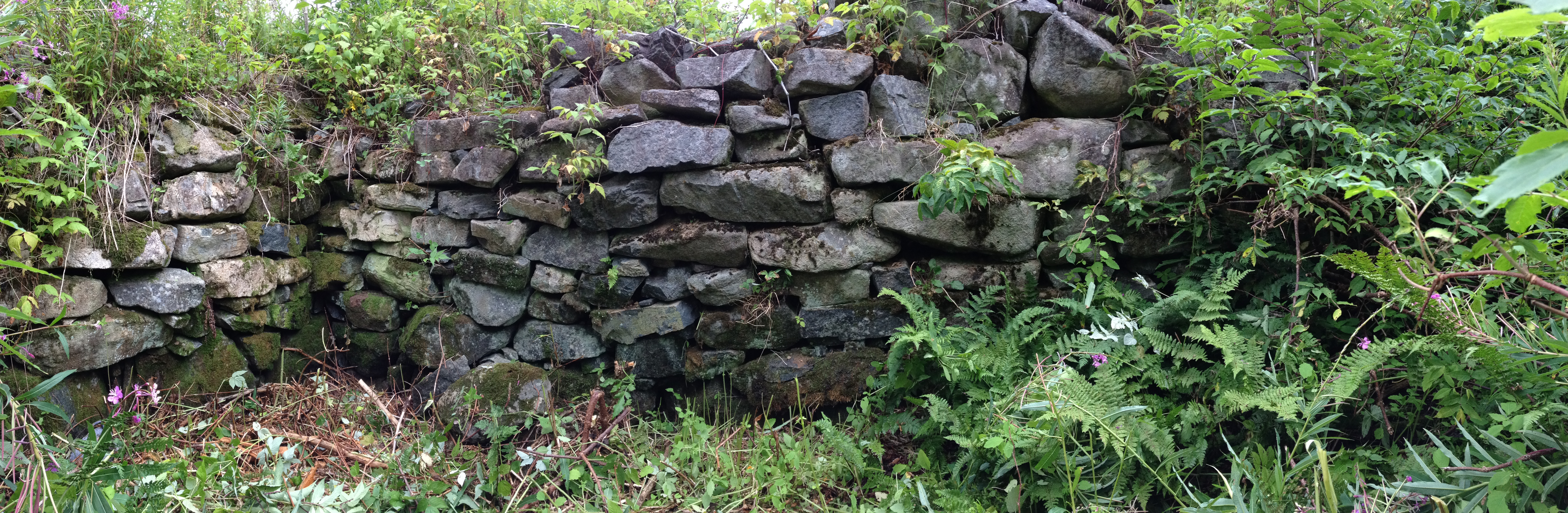
These are the remains of the cellar wall of a house built in the early 1800s by Colin, son of Loddy MacDonald. 45°43′6.6″N 62°9′59.5″W
