= Caribou-Munroes Island Provincial Park =

Provincial park in Nova Scotia, Canada

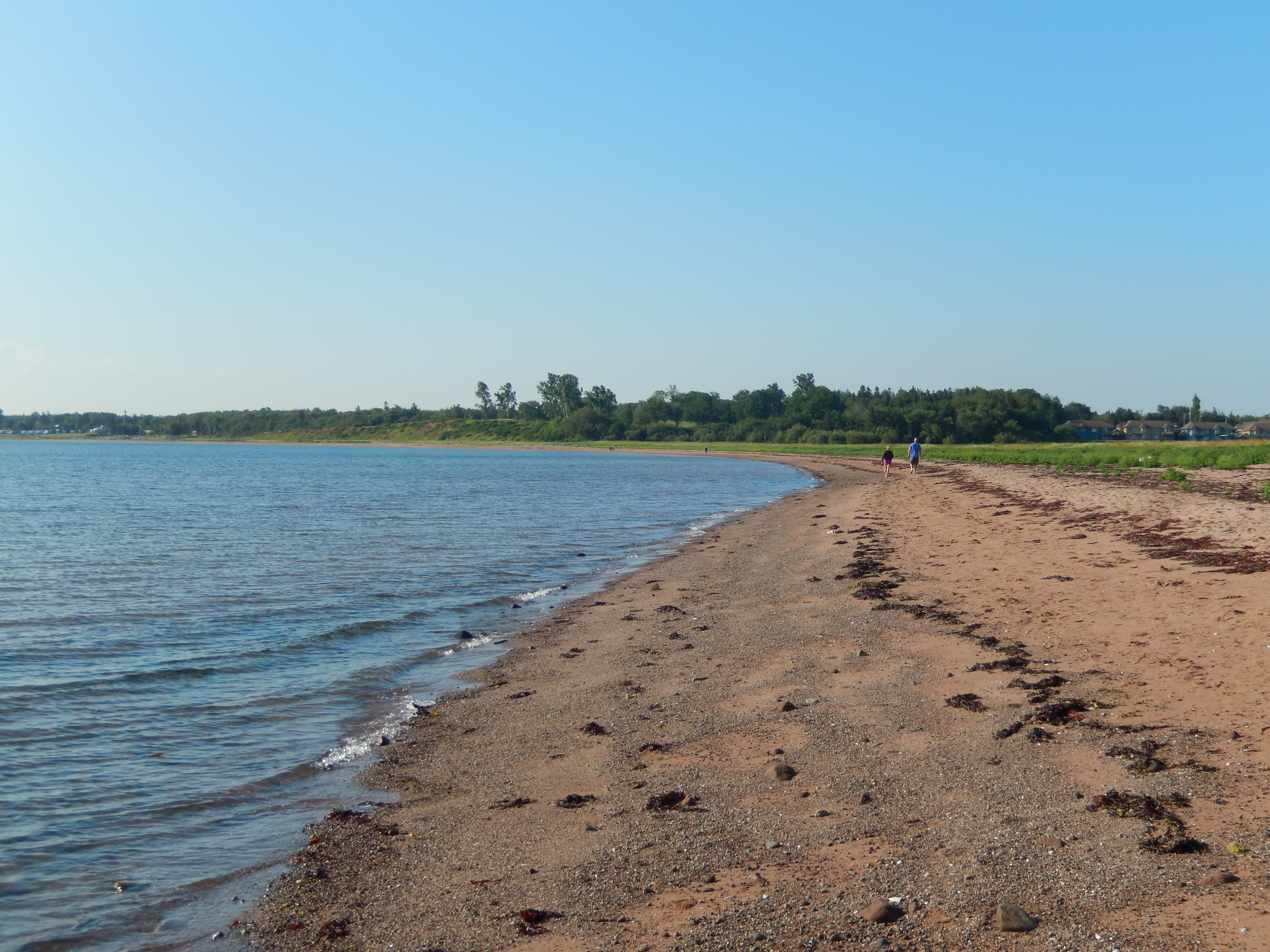
- Interactive map of Caribou-Munroes Island Provincial Park
- Type: Provincial park
- Coordinates: 45°43′18″N 62°39′15″W
- Area: 137.41 hectares (339.5 acres)
- Created: February 22, 1972
- Operator: Parks and Recreation Division, Nova Scotia Department of Natural Resources
- Open: June-October
- Status: Designated; Operational
- Website: Official website

Caribou-Munroes Island Provincial Park is a provincial park in the Canadian province of Nova Scotia, located in the community of Caribou. The park is located 11 kilometers north of the Town of Pictou. The park has 95 campsites, 54 of which are unserviced. The park is a popular spot for birdwatching, and was rated amongst 12 must visit Nova Scotia provincial parks by Maritime Atlantic.

== Climate ==
Caribou-Munroes Island Provincial Park is located in the Dfb zone of the Köppen climate classification. This zone experiences four different seasons with warm, humid summers, and cold, snowy winters. A majority of the province is within this zone. According to the Commission for Environmental Cooperation, the Caribou-Munroes is located within 8.1.9 Maritime Lowlands ecological zone, which it shares with the New Glasgow area, as well as Prince Edward Island, parts of northern and north-eastern New Brunswick, and the parts of the Nova Scotian North Shore. The forests within this area consist of red spruce, balsam firs, red maples, and eastern white pines.

== Geography ==
Map illustrating the closeness of the two peninsulas.

The park consists of the 1.61 kilometer (1 mile) beach, where the lowest point is 0 meters at sea level, and a highest point of 15 meters on parts of the trail. The tides of the Northumberland Strait occasionally make parts of the park inaccessible. Munroe's Island isn't an island like the name implies, but is instead a peninsula surrounded by the Northumberland Strait, with a lake on the eastern part of the peninsula. Caribou Island, which is also a peninsula, is nearby, but not in the park itself.
