= Harrison Settlement =

Community in Nova Scotia, Canada

Coordinates: 45°30′58.79″N 64°22′46.34″W

Harrison Settlement in Nova Scotia

Harrison Settlement is a community in the Canadian province of Nova Scotia, located in Cumberland County.
