= Lornevale =

Community in Nova Scotia, Canada

Coordinates: 45°28′2.04″N 63°40′57.65″W

Lornevale in Nova Scotia

Lornevale is a community in the Canadian province of Nova Scotia, located in Colchester County.
