= Kingross, Nova Scotia =

Community in Nova Scotia, Canada

Coordinates: 46°26′51.2″N 60°55′20.21″W

Kingross in Nova Scotia

Kingross is a small community in the Canadian province of Nova Scotia, located in Inverness County on Cape Breton Island. The artist Anne Morrell Robinson operates a quilt shop in Kingross.

== History ==
Kingross was named after Angus Ross, who immigrated to the area from Skye and was likely the first settler. He thrived in the area and was nicknamed "King".
