= Long Lake (Nova Scotia) =

Long Lake (Nova Scotia) could mean the following:

== Annapolis County ==
- Long Lake at 44°39′10″N 65°13′45″W
- Long Lake at 44°38′59″N 65°2′59″W
- Long Lake at 44°52′55″N 65°18′32″W

== Municipalite Argyle Municipality ==
- Long Lake at 43°54′40″N 65°52′51″W

== Cape Breton Regional Municipality ==
- Long Lake at 45°50′10″N 60°12′2″W

== Municipality of the District of Chester ==
- Long Lake at 44°34′16″N 64°4′46″W
- Long Lake at 44°18′24″N 64°43′29″W
- Long Lake at 44°35′50″N 64°21′40″W
- Long Lake at 44°48′57″N 64°23′14″W

== Municipality of Clare ==
- Long Lake at 44°20′34″N 65°55′7″W

== Colchester County ==
- Long Lake at 45°32′24″N 63°31′1″W
- Long Lake at 45°16′19″N 63°9′51″W
- Long Lake at 44°52′55″N 65°18′32″W
- Long Lake at 45°31′0″N 63°29′57″W
- Long Lake at 45°16′19″N 63°9′51″W
- Long Lake at 45°34′43″N 63°23′15″W

== Cumberland County ==
- Long Lake at 45°54′20″N 64°9′9″W
- Long Lake at 45°39′46″N 64°19′22″W

== Guysborough County ==
- Long Lake at 45°0′43″N 62°3′47″W
- Long Lake at 45°14′4″N 61°6′18″W
- Long Lake at 45°12′7″N 62°3′12″W
- Long Lake at 45°33′15″N 61°29′36″W
- Long Lake at 45°24′58″N 61°42′1″W
- Long Lakeat 45°19′0″N 61°13′0″W

== Hants County ==
- Long Lake at 44°48′21″N 64°0′29″W
- Long Lake at 44°57′47″N 63°48′10″W

== Halifax Regional Municipality ==
- Long Lake at 44°30′7″N 63°53′15″W
- Long Lake at 44°43′50″N 62°58′27″W
- Long Lake at 44°42′16″N 64°0′38″W
- Long Lake at 44°42′20″N 63°47′17″W
- Long Lakeat 44°42′21″N 63°44′49″W
- Long Lake at 44°39′33″N 64°3′36″W
- Long Lakeat 44°38′8″N 63°51′13″W
- Long Lake at 44°49′27″N 62°46′54″W
- Long Lake at 44°45′43″N 64°2′16″W
- Long Lake at 44°43′58″N 63°27′50″W
- Long Lakeat 44°44′4″N 63°4′23″W
- Long Lakeat 45°2′56″N 62°56′42″W
- Long Lake at 44°58′24″N 62°35′47″W
- Long Lake at 45°12′44″N 62°46′14″W
- Long Lakeat 45°5′37″N 62°21′58″W
- Long Lake at 44°48′54″N 62°49′50″W
- Long Lake at 45°4′48″N 62°36′7″W
- Long Lake at 44°37′20″N 63°38′20″W

== Kings County ==
- Long Lake at 44°55′20″N 64°49′45″W

== Pictou County ==
- Long Lake at 45°21′14″N 62°36′58″W

== Region of Queens Municipality ==
- Long Lake at 44°12′37″N 64°42′24″W
- Long Lake at 43°49′37″N 64°53′35″W

== Lunenburg County ==
- Long Lake at 44°18′24″N 64°43′29″W

== Richmond County ==
- Long Lake at 45°40′32″N 60°54′27″W
- Long Lake at 45°39′55″N 60°43′1″W

== Shelburne County ==
- Long Lake at 44°9′18″N 65°23′33″W

== Municipality of the District of Staint Mary's ==
- Long Lake at 45°0′43″N 62°3′47″W
- Long Lake at 45°12′7″N 62°3′12″W
- Long Lake at 45°10′25″N 62°7′26″W
- Long Lake at 45°21′36″N 62°13′36″W
- Long Lake at 45°13′50″N 62°22′55″W
- Long Lake at 45°20′18″N 62°0′25″W
- Long Lake at 45°8′15″N 61°49′56″W
- Long Lakes at 45°1′33″N 62°7′40″W

== Victoria County ==
- Long Lake at 46°48′44″N 60°29′24″W

== Yarmouth County ==
- Long Lake at 44°0′10″N 65°30′23″W

== Other ==
=== Rivers ===
- Long Lake Brook in Colchester County at 45°40′0″N 63°21′57″W
- Long Lake Brook in Colchester County at 45°31′0″N 63°29′57″W
- Long Lakes Brook in Colchester County at 45°1′0″N 62°5′57″W

=== Park ===
- Long Lake Provincial Park in the Halifax Regional Municipality at 44°36′55″N 63°37′16″W
