= Sand River, Nova Scotia =

Community in Nova Scotia, Canada

Coordinates: 45°31′56.38″N 64°40′42.86″W

Sand River in Nova Scotia

Sand River is a community in the Canadian province of Nova Scotia, located in Cumberland County.
