= List of protected areas of Nova Scotia =

This is a list of protected areas of Nova Scotia, Canada.

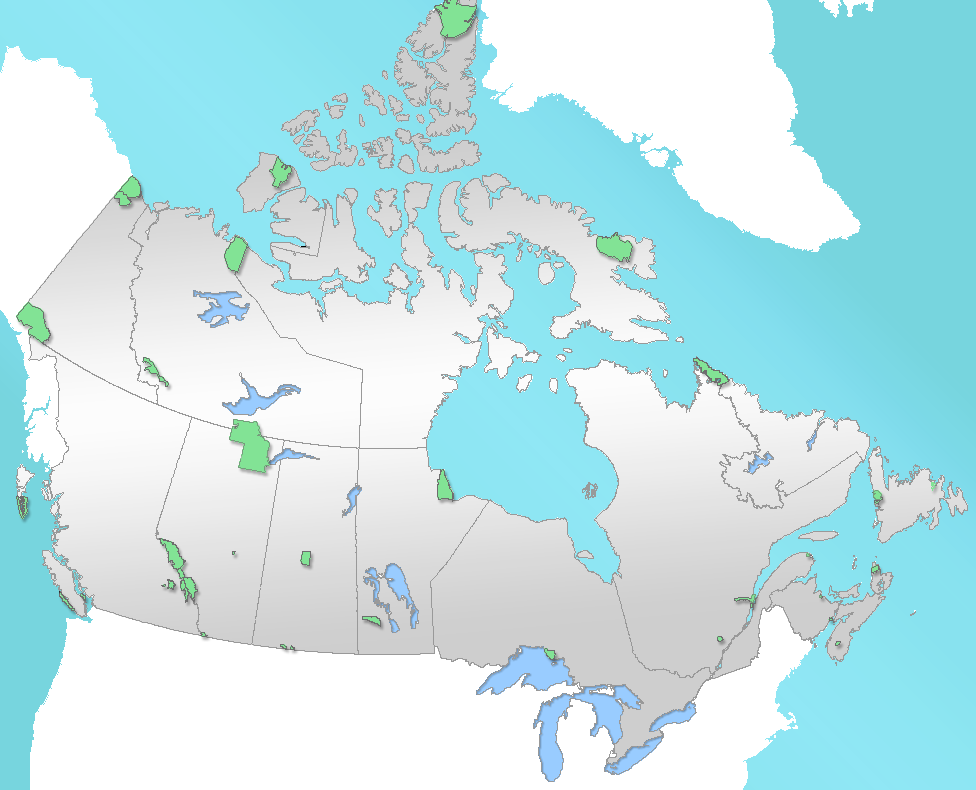
Protected areas by province

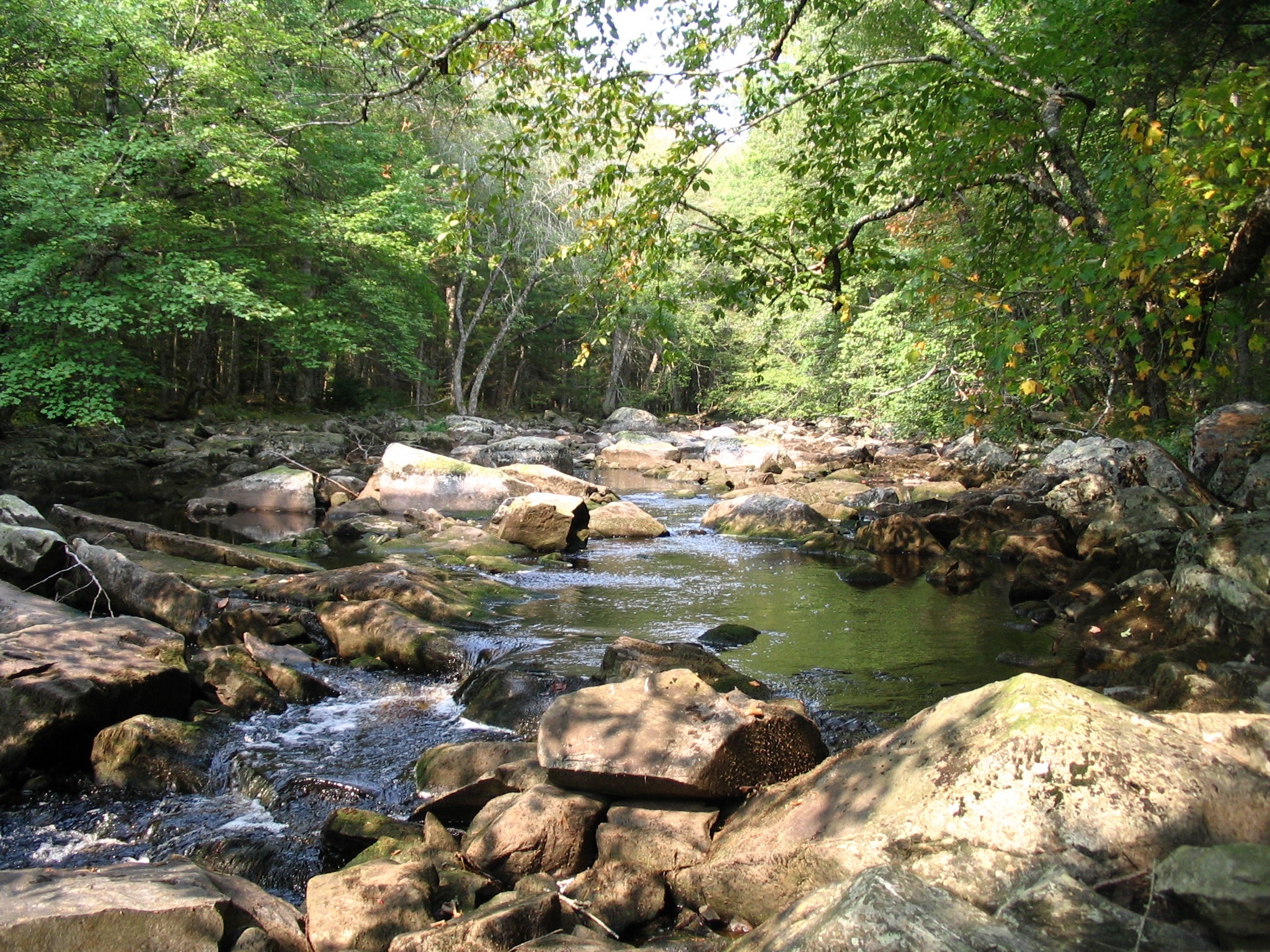
Kejimkujik National Park, Little River

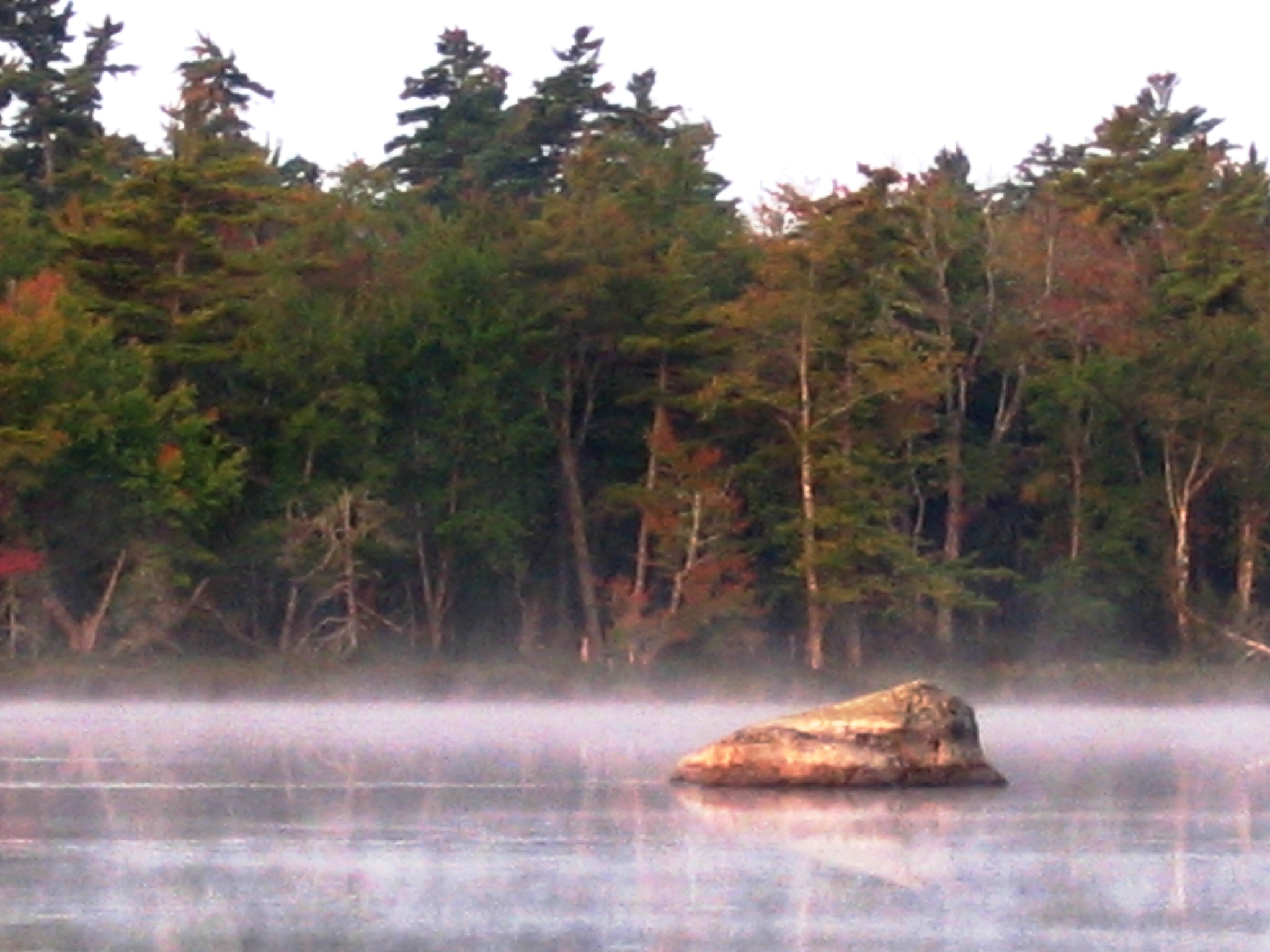
Kejimkujik National Park, Frozen Ocean Lake

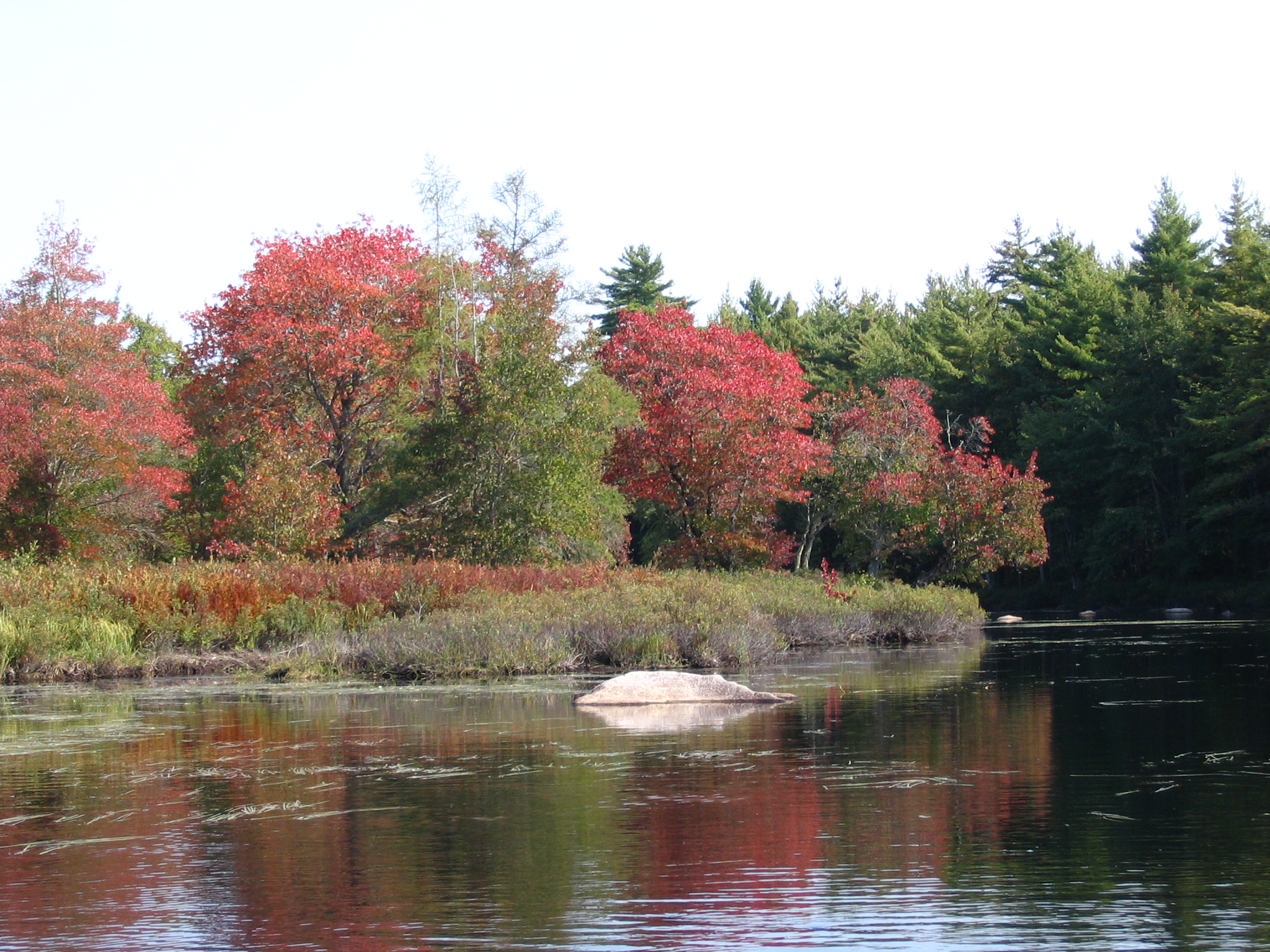
Kejimkujik National Park, Still Brook

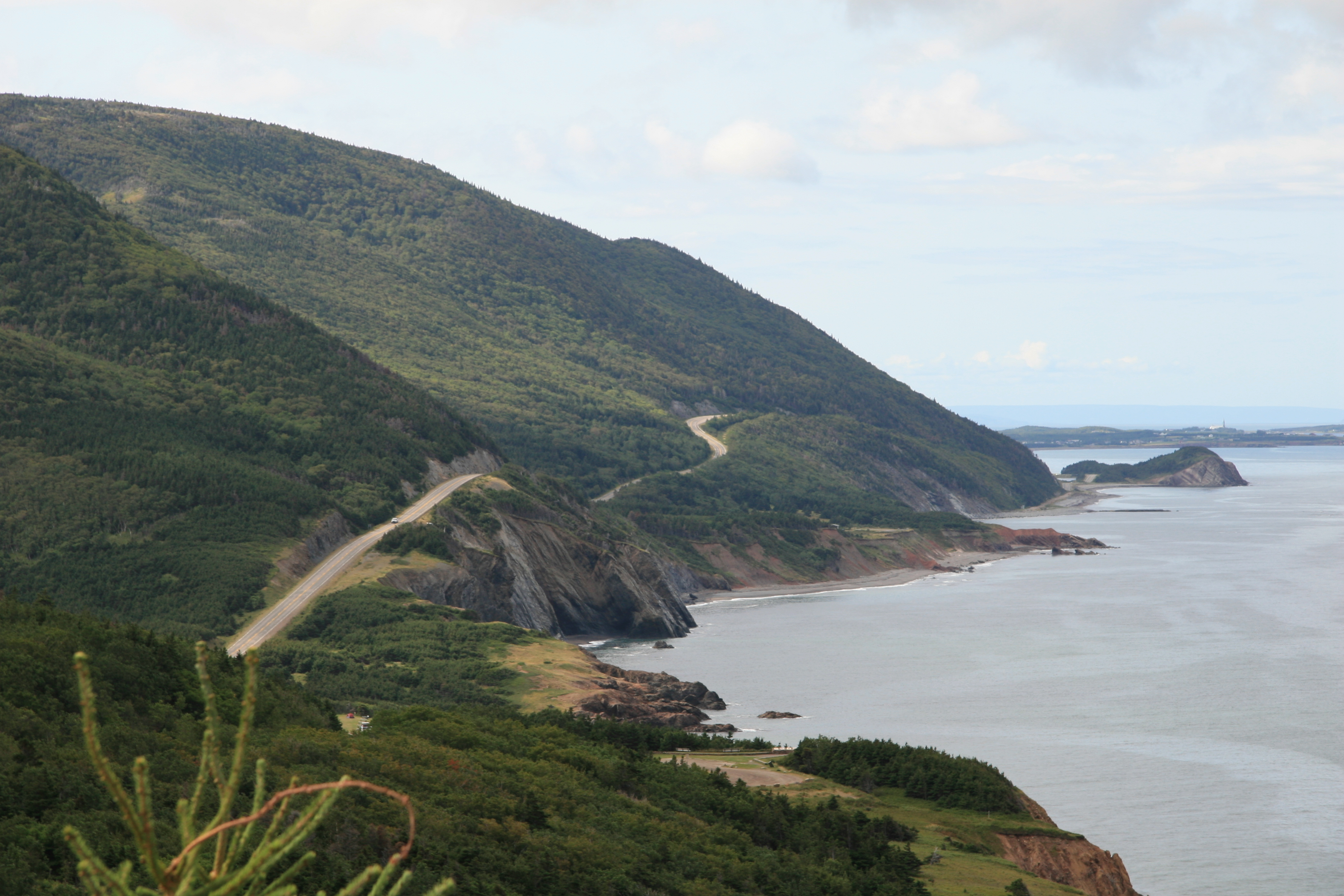
Cape Breton Highlands National Park, the Cabot Trail

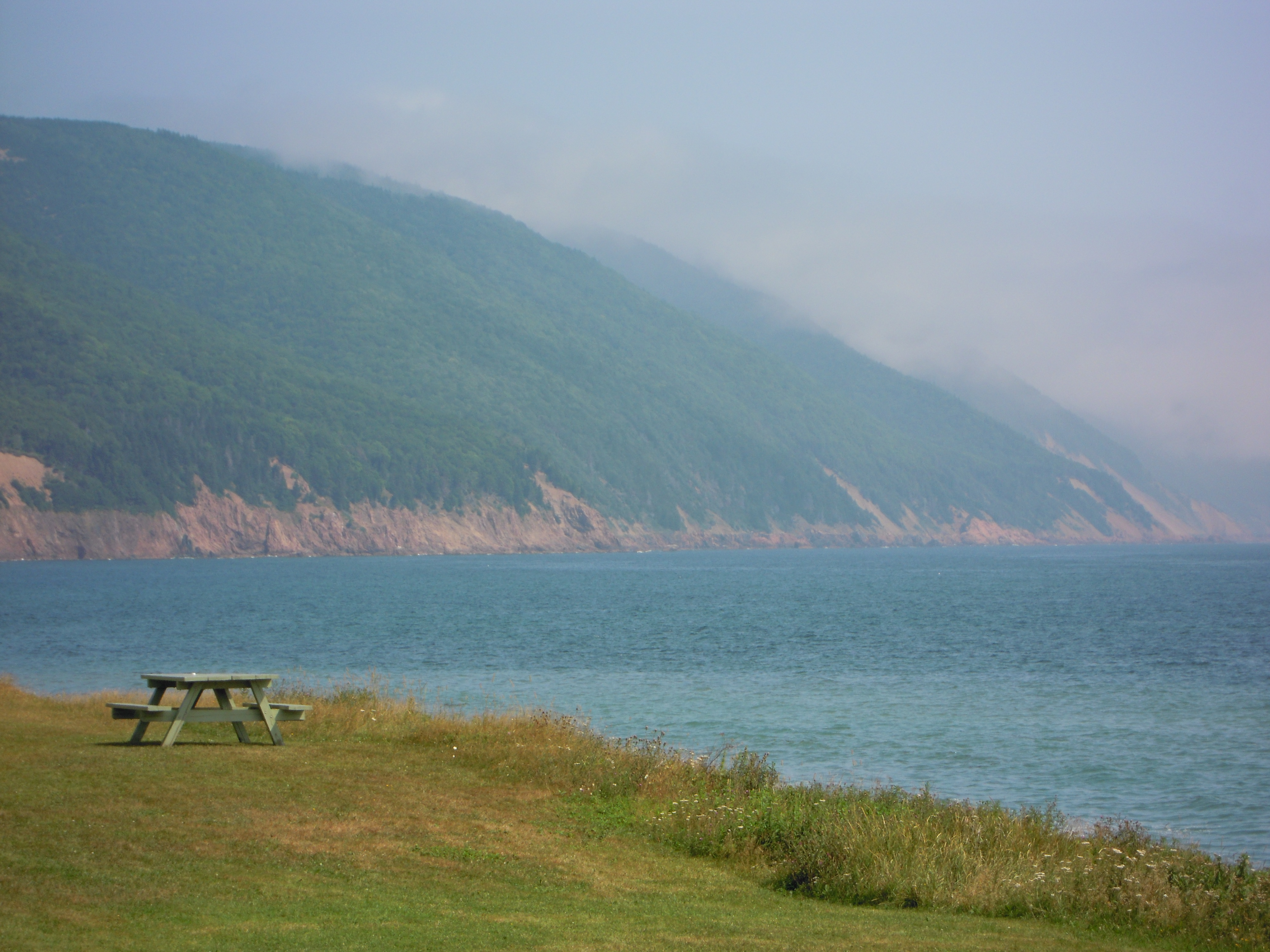
Cabots Landing Provincial Park

== National Parks ==
National parks of Canada are protected natural spaces throughout the country that represent distinct geographical regions of the nation. Under the administration of Parks Canada, a government branch, national parks allow for public enjoyment without compromising the area for future generations, including the management of Canadian wildlife and habitat within the ecosystems of the park. There are two formal national parks in Nova Scotia, with one managed as a reserve.

- Cape Breton Highlands National Park
- Kejimkujik National Park — this park is composed of two sections. The main park is inland, with a seaside adjunct for day use only located near Liverpool.
- Sable Island National Park Reserve

== Canadian Heritage Rivers ==
The Canadian Heritage Rivers System is a program administered by the federal, provincial and territorial governments to conserve river heritage.

- Shelburne River
- Margaree River-Lake Ainslie River System

== National Wildlife Areas ==
A National Wildlife Area is a conservation status for a geographical region in Canada that restricts most human activities on that region. However, land use permits may be issued "for activities that are compatible with conservation". These areas are managed by the Canadian Wildlife Service.

- Big Glace Bay Lake National Wildlife Area (394 ha; 970 acres)
- Boot Island National Wildlife Area (106.6 ha; 263 acres)
- Chignecto National Wildlife Area (475 ha; 1,170 acres)
- John Lusby Marsh National Wildlife Area (552 ha; 1,360 acres)
- Sand Pond National Wildlife Area (532 ha; 1,310 acres)
- Sea Wolf Island National Wildlife Area (40.5 ha; 100 acres)
- Wallace Bay National Wildlife Area (580 ha; 1,400 acres)

== National Migratory Bird Sanctuaries ==
Protected areas administered by Canadian Wildlife Service

- Big Glace Bay Lake (240 ha; 590 acres)
- Kentville (200 ha; 490 acres)
- Port L'Hebert (350 ha; 860 acres)
- Port Joli (280 ha; 690 acres)
- Sable River (260 ha; 640 acres)
- Amherst Point (429 ha; 1,060 acres)
- Sable Island (2,350 ha; 5,800 acres)
- Haley Lake (100 ha; 250 acres)

== Provincial wilderness areas ==
As of January 2016 there were 68 wilderness areas in Nova Scotia. They are regulated by the Wilderness Areas Protection Act under the responsibility of Nova Scotia Environment and are areas where resource extraction, development, use of vehicles and similar activities are prohibited. Hunting, trapping and fishing are permitted.

- Alder Grounds Wilderness Area
- Archibald Lake Wilderness Area
- Boggy Lake Wilderness Area
- Bonnet Lake Barrens Wilderness Area
- Bowers Meadows Wilderness Area
- Canso Coastal Barrens Wilderness Area
- Clattenburgh Brook Wilderness Area
- Cloud Lake Wilderness Area
- Economy River Wilderness Area
- Eigg Mountain-James River Wilderness Area
- Five Bridge Lakes Wilderness Area
- French River Wilderness Area
- Gabarus Wilderness Area
- Gully Lake Wilderness Area
- Jim Campbells Barren Wilderness Area
- Kelley River Wilderness Area
- Lake Rossignol Wilderness Area
- Liscomb River Wilderness Area
- Margaree River Wilderness Area
- McGill Lake Wilderness Area
- Middle River Wilderness Area
- North River Wilderness Area
- Ogden Round Lake Wilderness Area
- Polletts Cove-Aspy Fault Wilderness Area
- Portapique River Wilderness Area
- Raven Head Wilderness Area
- Scatarie Island Wilderness Area
- Shelburne River Wilderness Area
- Ship Harbour Long Lake Wilderness Area
- South Panuke Wilderness Area
- Sugarloaf Mountain Wilderness Area
- Tangier Grand Lake Wilderness Area
- Terence Bay Wilderness Area
- The Big Bog Wilderness Area
- Tidney River Wilderness Area
- Tobeatic Wilderness Area
- Tracadie River Wilderness Area
- Trout Brook Wilderness Area
- Waverley–Salmon River Long Lake Wilderness Area
- White Lake Wilderness Area

== Provincial nature reserves ==
As of January 2016 there were 70 nature reserves in Nova Scotia. They are ecological sites regulated by the Special Places Protection Act, an Act which also protects archaeological, historical and palaeontological sites. They are areas of special natural ecosystems, plant and animal species, features and natural processes. They are areas that provide educational or research field areas but where recreation is restricted.

- Abraham Lake
- Bornish Hill
- Duncans Cove
- Great Barrens and Quinan Lakes
- MacFarlane Woods
- Panuke Lake
- Ponhook Lake
- Quinns Meadow
- River Inhabitants
- Roman Valley
- Rush Lake
- Sloans Lake
- Spinneys Heath
- Sporting Lake
- Washabuck River

== Provincial protected beaches ==
- Aulds Cove Beach
- Ballantyne Cove Beach
- Bartletts Beach
- Bayfield Beach
- Beach Meadows Beach
- Beatty Marsh Beach
- Big Pond Beach
- Black Point Beach
- Bramber Beach
- Bridgeport Beach
- Cape Jack Beach
- Carters Beach
- Catalone Gut Beach
- Chance Harbour Beach
- Cherry Hill Beach
- Cheverie Beach
- Christies Beach
- Church Point Beach
- Collindale Beach
- Conrods Beach and Lawrencetown Beach
- Cooks Cove Beach
- Crescent Beach
- Dominion Beach
- Dunns Beach and Monks Head Beach
- Fancys Beach
- Florence Beach
- Fox Island Main Beach
- Fox Point Beach
- Framboise Beach
- Gabarus Beach
- Glace Bay Beach
- Green Bay Beach
- Hadley Cove Beach
- Half Island Beach
- Hampton Beach
- Harrington Beach
- Hirtles Beach
- Inverness Beach
- Iona Beach
- Isaels Cove Beach
- Jersey Cove Beach
- Johnstons Pond Beach
- Kingsburg Beach
- Larry's River Beach
- Lily Pond Beach
- Linwood Beach
- Little Dyke Beach
- Livingstone Cove Beach
- Lower Cove Beach
- Lower Debert Beach
- Lower East Chezzetcook Beach
- Lower Half Island Cove Beach
- Lower Ardoise Beach
- Mahoneys Beach
- Main-A-Dieu Beach
- Majors Point Beach
- Malcolm Cove Beach
- Malignant Cove Beach
- Margaree Harbour Beach
- McCormacks Beach
- Meisners Beach
- Merigomish Beach
- Middle Harbour Beach
- Noonans Beach
- North Bay Beach
- North Harbour Beach
- Partridge Island Beach
- Point Michaud Beach
- Pomquet Beach
- Pondville Beach
- Port Greville Beach
- Port Hood Beach
- Port Morien Beach
- Queensport Beach
- Ragged Harbour Beach
- Riverside Beach
- Rockey Bay Beach
- Sand Beach
- Sand Point Beach
- Sand River
- Sandy Bay Beach
- Schooner Beach
- Scots Bay Beach
- St. Catherines River Beach
- The Hawk Beach
- Tor Bay Beach
- West Apple River Beach
- Westhaver Beach

== Provincial game sanctuaries ==
- Blandford
- Brule Point
- Chignecto
- Hackmatac Lake
- Liscomb Game Sanctuary
- Martinique Beach
- Melbourne Lake
- Shubenacadie
- Spectacle Island Game Sanctuary
- Sunnybrea
- Upper Clements
- Waverley

== Provincial wildlife management areas ==
- Abercrombie
- Antigonish
- Debert
- Dewey Creek
- Eastern Shore Islands
- Hibernia
- Maccan River
- Manganese Mines
- Minas Basin
- Pearl Island
- Scatarie Island
- Shubenacadie
- Tobeatic

== Marine Protected Areas ==
- Bowie Seamount Marine Protected Area
- Eastport Marine Protected Area
- Gilbert Bay Marine Protected Area
- Gully Marine Protected Area
- Musquash Estuary Marine Protected Area
- Tarium Niryutait Marine Protected Area
- St. Anns Bank Marine Protected Area
- Laurentian Channel Marine Protected Area
- Scott Islands Marine National Wildlife Area

== Private Protected Areas ==
Private Protected Areas are owned by the Nova Scotia Nature Trust, the Nature Conservancy of Canada, the Nova Scotia Bird Society and the Bowater Mersey Paper Company.

== See also ==
- List of provincial parks in Nova Scotia
- List of National Parks of Canada
- List of Canadian provincial parks
- List of parks in the Halifax Regional Municipality
