= Smuggler's Cove Provincial Park =

Provincial park in Nova Scotia, Canada

Coordinates: 44.170°N 66.183°W

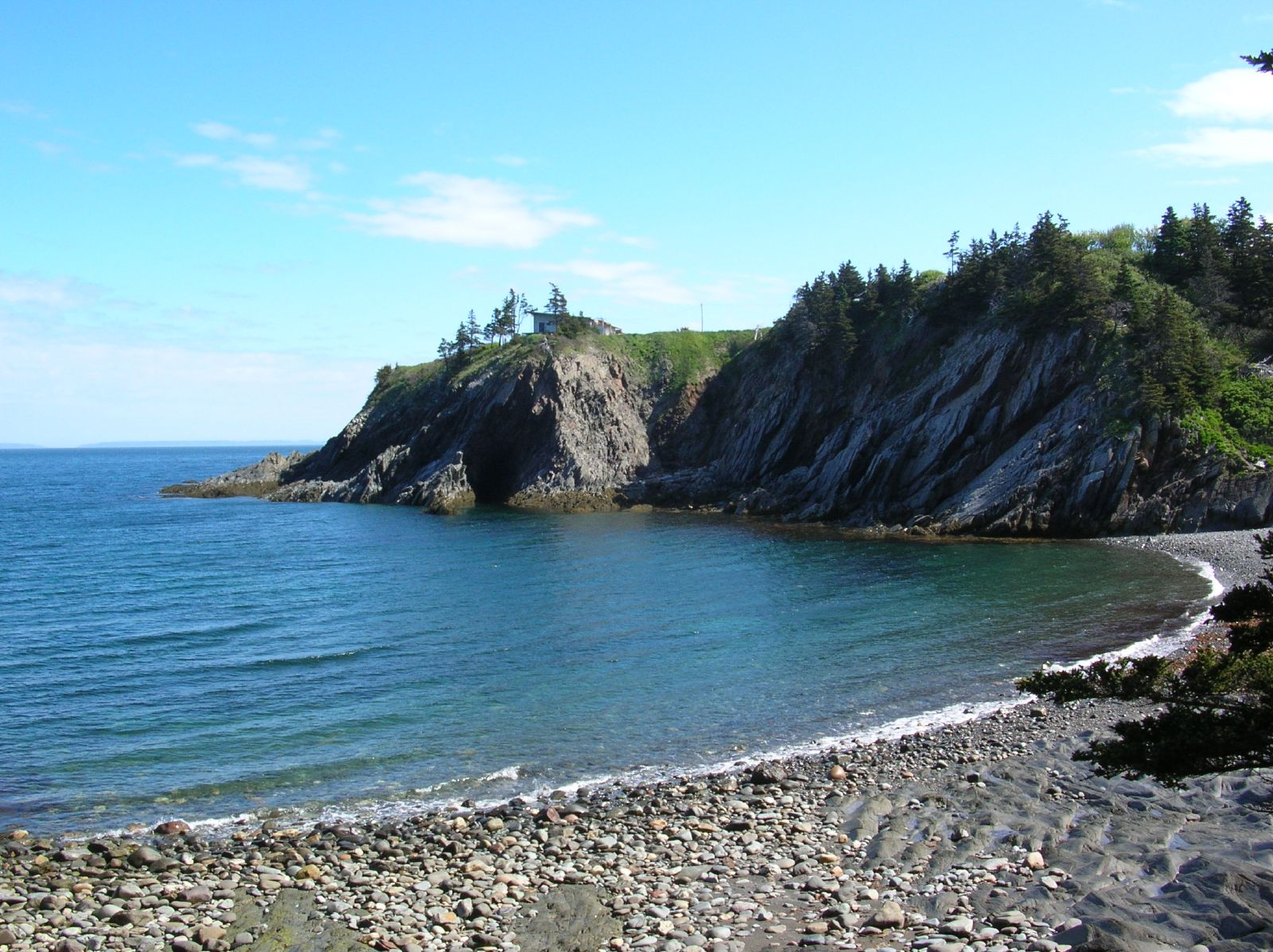
Smuggler's Cove Provincial Park at St. Marys Bay

Smuggler’s Cove Provincial Park (also known as "Le Fourneau") is a provincial park located in Meteghan, Digby County, Nova Scotia, Canada, and can be found alongside Highway 1 in the Yarmouth and Acadian Shores region.

Smuggler’s Cove is known for the small cave in the cliff used for the smuggling of liquor during prohibition in the 1920s. The ocean waters fill the cove during high tide which prevents access to the cave, but it can be traversed briefly during low tide.
