= Liscomb Game Sanctuary =

Conservation area in Nova Scotia, Canada

Coordinates: 45°6′34″N 62°29′16.3″W

Liscomb Sanctuary in Nova Scotia

Liscomb Game Sanctuary is a conservation area that straddles the border of Halifax Regional Municipality and Guysborough County in the Canadian province of Nova Scotia. Nova Scotia Route 374 runs north–south through the sanctuary. Within the sanctuary are two nature reserves and parts of two wilderness areas.

== The game sanctuary ==
Administered by the Department of Natural Resources of the Government of Nova Scotia, Liscomb game sanctuary was established in 1928 as an area where hunting and trapping were prohibited. Its boundaries have been revised since then, but it now covers an area of 43,244 hectares (166.97 mi^{2}). Since 1996 there has been a short hunting season in which only muzzle-loading firearms are permitted. The Alder Ground wilderness area and the Boggy Lake wilderness area partially overlap the sanctuary, resulting in 844 hectares being designated as both sanctuary and wilderness area. However, a quarter of the reserve is privately owned, largely by pulp industry interests.

Land classification	Area (ha)
Forest	36,027
Bogs and wetlands	3,372
Lakes and ponds	2,361
Barrens	852
Roads, etc.	275

The sanctuary is habitat for white-tailed deer and the endangered mainland Nova Scotia moose. It was one of the last areas left to contain caribou. There is current contention amongst wilderness groups as to whether forest harvesting practices involving clear-cutting are affecting wildlife. The Forest Products Association of Nova Scotia contends that the presence of even aged forest stands is due to wildfire rather than harvesting practice.

Parts of the Liscomb Game Sanctuary are of geological importance as they are within the Quartzite Barrens of Nova Scotia, which historically produced lots of gold. Exploration drilling was taking place in 2018.

== Abraham Lake Nature Reserve ==
Within the game sanctuary is the Abraham Lake Nature Reserve, a provincially designated nature reserve owned by the Nature Conservancy of Canada (NCC). Extending over 256 hectares (630 acres), it is noted for its old-growth red spruce, some of which are 200 years old and 30 m tall, which is now a rarity in Nova Scotia. The land was donated to NCC in 1995 by Scott Paper Company and is surrounded by industrial forest lands. There is a 4.5 km hiking trail on the reserve.

== Rush Lake Nature Reserve ==
Also within the game sanctuary is the 307-hectare Rush Lake Nature Reserve which has one of the last stands of mature Acadian forest within the sanctuary. Tree species present are red spruce, sugar maple, yellow birch and American beech. It provides habitat for moose, an endangered species in mainland Nova Scotia.
