= New Chester, Nova Scotia =

Community in Nova Scotia, Canada

Coordinates: 45°1′21.73″N 62°12′41.86″W

New Chester in Nova Scotia

New Chester is a small community in the Canadian province of Nova Scotia, located in the Municipality of the District of St. Mary's in Guysborough County.
