= Nova Scotia Department of Environment and Climate Change =

Government department

Department of Environment and Climate Change
Government department overview
- Formed: 1973; 53 years ago
- Minister responsible: Tim Halman
- Deputy Minister responsible: Lora MacEachern
- Website: novascotia.ca/nse

The Department of Environment and Climate Change of the Canadian province of Nova Scotia is responsible for environmental protection. The department administers the provisions of the Environment Act.

== History ==
Established in 1973 to administer the Environmental Protection Act, the then-Department of the Environment was responsible for developing and implementing policies related to environmental management and protection.

In 2000, the Hamm government announced a restructuring of government departments that led to the grouping of the Department of Labour with the Department of the Environment, which was renamed Department of Environment and Labour. In 2008, it was made a separate department again.

In 2021, the department gained its current name.

== Divisions ==
- Inspection, Compliance, and Enforcement Division
- Policy Division
- Sustainability and Applied Science Division
- Climate Change Division

== See also ==
- Government of Nova Scotia
