= Murdena Marshall =

Mi'kmaw Elder and Knowledge Keeper

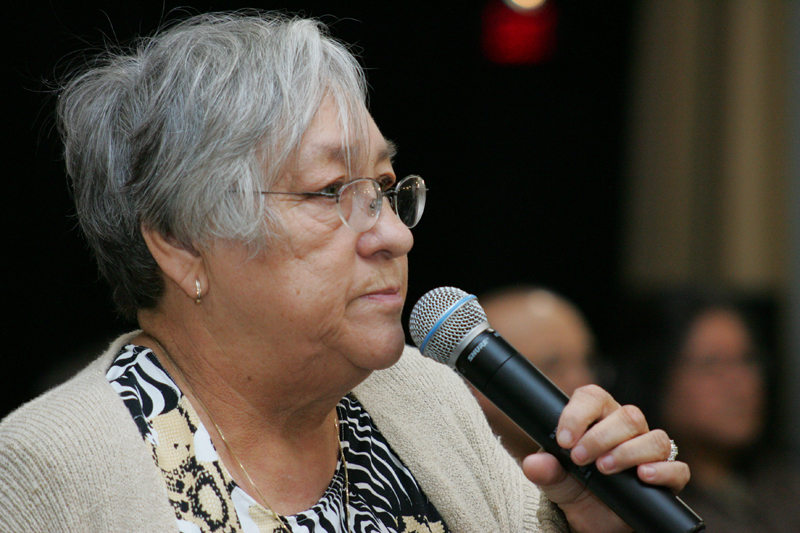
- Murdena Marshall speaking at a book launch event, March 30, 2007
- Born: Murdena Marie Stevens; September 17, 1942; Whycocomagh
- Died: October 22, 2018 (aged 76); Eskasoni
- Spouse: Albert Marshall
- Children: 6

Murdena Marie Marshall (née Stevens; September 17, 1942 – October 22, 2018) was a Mi'kmaw elder, language speaker, knowledge keeper, Traditional Knowledge expert, spiritual leader, author, and associate professor of Mi'kmaw Studies at Cape Breton University. Along with her husband Albert D. Marshall and biologist Cheryl Bartlett, Marshall is recognized as the co-creator of the influential Two-Eyed Seeing research methodology, a methodology now used extensively within Canada, particularly within science and health. Marshall received numerous awards and honors, including an honorary Doctors of Letters, honoris causa, from Cape Breton University in 2009 in recognition of her role in promoting and supporting Mi'kmaw culture and education. A strong advocate for education, several scholarships and awards have been created in her name, including the Murdena Marshall Science Award, and the Murdena and Albert Marshall Bursary at Dalhousie University.

== Early life and education ==
Marshall was born in Whycocomagh to parents Roddie and Elizabeth (Sylliboy) Stevens. Her mother died giving birth when Marshall was eight years old. According to Mi'kmaw custom, she lived with her mother's family and was raised by her grandfather, aunts and uncles. She was the granddaughter of Chief Gabriel Sylliboy, first elected chief of the Mi'kmaw Grand Council. Her grandfather had a strong influence over her education, ensuring she was educated in English and understood Mi'kmaw culture and language.

Marshall attended a Canadian federal government Indian Day School in Eskasoni for her elementary schooling. The Indian Day School in Eskasoni was a racially segregated school run by the Catholic Church on behalf of the federal government of Canada. Marshall attended the Catholic Middle School in Arichat, Cape Breton for grades nine and ten. She attended St. Joseph's Residential Convent School for Girls in Mabou for two years but did not finish her last year of studies.

Marshall returned to school in 1978 with the goal of becoming a teacher. Taking up studies at the University of New Brunswick, she obtained a Bachelor of Education degree in 1984. She also attained a Mi'kmaw Immersion certificate from St. Thomas University. After teaching in her Mi'kmaw community, she completed her Master of Education degree at Harvard University.

== Personal life ==
Murdena married Albert Marshall and lived in Eskasoni with her husband. She was a mother of six children. Her son Tommy died in 1978 and she stated it was his passing that influenced her decision to become a teacher and return to school.

Marshall died in Eskasoni on October 22, 2018. The Honourable Jane Cordy, gave notice of Marshall's death in a sitting of the Senate of Canada on October 25, 2018, noting her contributions to the people of Canada.

== Career ==
After working as a teacher in the Mi'kmaw community, Marshall taught at the University College of Cape Breton (now Cape Breton University). She helped develop and then teach in the Mi'kmaw Studies program along with fellow Mi'kmaw educator Sister Dorothy Moore, Dr. Stephanie Inglis, and Dr. Charles Mac Donald. Marshall helped found the Mi'kmaq College Institute, now known as Unama'ki College.

Together with husband Albert Marshall, and professor Cheryl Bartlett, Marshall co-created Integrative Science, an undergraduate degree program at CBU that brought together Western science and Indigenous traditional ecological knowledge. Integrative Science was created to address the lack of Indigenous knowledges in science curricula and to bolster the number of Mi'kmaw students in the university's science programs. The creation of the program was an initiative of Marshall's to support her hope "that one day the educational mainstream will recognize the Indigenous sciences along-side the Western sciences."

Marshall continued to be active after her retirement, participating in projects with the Unama'ki Institute of Natural Resources, the National Aboriginal Health Organization, and the Native Women's Association of Canada. She was an key early member of the Elders' Advisory Council of the Mi'kmawey Debert Cultural Centre.

== Published Works ==
- Mi'kmaq hieroglyphic prayers: Readings in North America's first Indigenous script (1995)
- Values, customs and traditions of the Mi’kmaq nation (1997)
- I got it from an Elder: Conversations in healing language (2007)
- Muin aqq L'uiknek Te'sijik Ntuksuinu'k/Muin and the Seven Bird Hunters (2010)
- Nkij'inen Teluet: Kina'matnewe'l Telimuksi'ki We'wkl Atukwaqnn (2013)

== Recognition ==
- 1989 - Outstanding Leadership Award, Eskasoni First Nation
- 1996 - National Aboriginal Role Model Award
- 2006 - Grand Chief Donald Marshall Senior Memorial Elder Award
- 2009 - Degree Doctor of Letters honoris causa, Cape Breton University
- 2011 - Recognized in the Senate of Canada in Ottawa by the Honourable Jane Cordy
