= Two-Eyed Seeing =

Term for harmonizing Western and Indigenous knowledge

Two-Eyed Seeing (Mi'kmaq: Etuaptmumk) is a basis in viewing the world through both Western and Indigenous knowledges and worldviews.

Two-Eyed Seeing was introduced by Mi'kmaq Elders Albert D. Marshall and Murdena Marshall from Eskasoni First Nation, alongside professor Cheryl Bartlett. Albert Marshall describes Two-Eyed Seeing as an approach to viewing the world "from one eye with the strengths of Indigenous ways of knowing, and to see from the other eye with the strengths of Western ways of knowing, and to use both of these eyes together".

Two-Eyed Seeing was originally brought forward as a tactic to encourage Mi'kmaq university students to pursue an education in science. Since its implementation, the use of Two-Eyed Seeing has been integrated into various institutions' strategic plans, government policies, and research, some of which include the Canadian Institute of Health Research.

== Background ==
=== Integrative Science ===
In the 1990s, Murdena and Albert Marshall, and Cheryl Bartlett, began a grassroots effort to encourage Indigenous students to participate in science and science-related programs at Cape Breton University (CBU), by developing a science curriculum of both Mi'kmaw and other Indigenous knowledges (IK) and ways of knowing, with mainstream/western knowledge. Its inception began when Bartlett asked Murdena why there was a lack of Mi'kmaq enrollment; her reply: "Well, we Mi'kmaqs have been here for thousands of years—don't you think we've learned something about plants and animals?". The tendency for Western science to fragment and silo the world does not fall in with Mi'kmaw worldview, and thus another reason for a lack of enthusiasm from Mi'kmaq students to pursue an academic career in science.

Bartlett and the Marshalls are the parents of the Integrative Science academic program, conceptualized in the mid-1990s and brought into fruition in 1999 at CBU. The Integrative Science program was developed to shed light on the importance of acquiring knowledge from various perspectives. The curriculum included new science courses called Mi'kmaw for "everything together" (MSIT) as part of a new established undergraduate program called "Integrative Science" (in Mi'kmaw, Toqwa'tu'kl Kjijitaqnn for "bringing our knowledges together") as part of the Bachelor of Science Community Studies (BScCS) degree at CBU.

In 2001, the Maritime Provinces Higher Education Commission approved the program and was then operational as an accredited university degree program in fall of 2001. In 2010, the program was formally assigned to the then new Department of Indigenous Studies. As of 2010, Albert, Murdena and Cheryl were no longer associated with the academic program of Integrative Science but have continued to work and promote the philosophies of Integrative Science.

=== Marshall, Marshall, and Bartlett ===
Dr. Murdena Marshall (1942–2018) was clan mother of the Muin (Bear) Clan and a spiritual leader for the Mi'kmaq. Murdena was instrumental in establishing the Mi'kmaw studies program and was an Associate Professor of Mi'kmaw studies at CBU. Albert Marshall, husband to Murdena Marshall, is from the Moose Clan and has been instrumental in being a voice on environmental issues for Mi'kmaw Elders in Unama'ki. Albert, in 2004, brought to light the guiding principle of Two-Eyed Seeing. Both Murdena and Albert were awarded honorary doctors of letters by CBU in 2009 in recognition of their work encouraging the integration of both Indigenous and Western knowledges, and have subsequently been contributors to the Integrative Science (IS) co-learning journey at CBU, alongside Cheryl Bartlett. Dr. Cheryl Bartlett is a biologist, specializing in wildlife parasitology, and friend of Murdena and Albert. The trio have worked together professionally to weave Indigenous and Western knowledges within science curricula and projects.

=== L'nu culture ===
The concept of Etuaptmumk (Two-Eyed Seeing) reflects the reality of L'nu (Mi'kmaq) constantly evolving as a nation due to colonialism and the ever-changing ecological circumstances of their territory. Two-Eyed Seeing, as a concept, has existed as part of L'nu tribal awareness since the early colonial period. A symbol, often associated with Two-Eyed Seeing, is Trees Holding Hands, conjured by late Mi'kmaw Chief of the Acadia First Nation, Charles Labrador. In Labrador's words, "you see the birch, pine, maple. Look underground and you'll see that all those trees are holding hands. We as people have to do the same".

== Challenges ==
In the Mi'kmaq language, Toqwa'tu'kl Kjijitaqnn (Integrative Science) evokes the idea of bringing knowledge together using the principles of Two-Eyed Seeing. The Two-Eyed Seeing approach is a method of education within Integrative Science that takes on a more holistic, multidisciplinary, and trans-cultural interpretation of the natural world and beyond. The advancement of Integrative Science may pose certain challenges, some of which include differences in interpretation among Indigenous and Western knowledge, differences in knowledge transfer, and available resources.

Philosophical differences among Western and Indigenous knowledge can lead to interpretation problems when attempting to understand the environment from both perspectives, for both the educators, researchers, and learners. Western-trained academics and researchers can unconsciously or consciously categorize it within classifications to understand the concept within Western science philosophies, missing the foundational make-up of Indigenous knowledge as fluid, adaptable and continuously evolving. Students may encounter differing responses to the decolonization of discussion and curricula, some of which have included frustration with peers who are not at the same level of comprehension. There can be an added pressure on Indigenous students who can be seen as experts on the subject and be called upon to share their 'expertise'.

Indigenous knowledges can be seen as living and breathing, based on "gardening" knowledge with living knowledge-keepers, compared to knowledge transfer via books and papers, widely used in Western-based curricula. Knowledge gardening reflects the inclusion of community members, such as Elders and people who work the land, to transfer knowledge passed down from generations and using examples and issues that reflect the interests of the students, and the community in general.

A lack of resources in the classroom and research has led to challenges when implementing an integrative approach. For settler educators, there can be long-term investment of time and effort needed, if not already familiar, to fully understand and engage with the material and deliver an educational experience that fully embraces both Indigenous and Western ways of knowing. In Canada's Nunavut Territory, there is insufficient K-12 Inuit educators to teach Inuit-ways of knowing and understanding, therefore requiring non-Inuit and non-Indigenous educators to teach Inuit values in school, which can lead to a misrepresentation of the full extent of what is required to be taught due to possible unpreparedness.

== In practice ==
Since its introduction, TES has been recognized and applied in Canadian academic institutions, community research, government strategic plans and policies.

Some examples include the Aboriginal Children's Hurt & Healing (ACHH) Initiative. ACHH is an example of research conducted within a TES approach to gather and share Indigenous knowledge towards the goal of improving the health care experience and outcomes. ACHH is a partnership between Dr. Margot Latimer of Dalhousie University/IWK Health and L'nu Eskasoni First Nation Health Director, Sharon Rudderham. This initiative was kickstarted as a result of a very low percentage of admitted Indigenous children to pediatric care when this demographic actually experiences a very high rate of pain, compared to their non-Indigenous counterparts. Through TES, findings have provided community-based evidence about pain occurrences in First Nation youth, facilitating the advocation of resources such as screening equipment and treatment processes. Additionally, an app was created to aid children express their pain and hurt to health care professionals. Through TES, early health care experiences of Indigenous youth were improved with the accessible distribution of health and wellness information and tools, that met the needs and requirements for both Indigenous and non-Indigenous youth.

A 2019 Reflection Paper prepared for the Canadian Commission for UNESCO proposed a "Two-Eyed" concept for guiding the development and application of Artificial Intelligence (AI). It suggested that seeing through one eye with the best of the Indigenous ways of knowing could be a model for balancing ethical concerns with technological priorities as seen through the eye of Western science.

Other examples of the concept of TES being used include the Department of Environment in Nunavut, in which the department used TES to manage their Arctic lands, and led camp events for students, through the Department of Education, to integrate Inuit knowledge and Western science. Canada's Truth and Reconciliation Commission has also used TES when gathering and analyzing information related to the trauma of Indigenous peoples and cultures when forced to attend Residential Schools. The guiding framework has also been employed at the Canadian Institute of Health research – Institute of Aboriginal Peoples' Health (CIHR-IAPH) and within the IAPH's 2014 strategic plan, highlighting its importance in Indigenous health research. The most recent strategic plan, CIHR strategic plan 2021–2031, outlines their commitment to continue to implement the integration of Indigenous ways of knowing within health research and decisions.

=== In Psychotherapy ===
Two-Eyed Seeing has been applied in mental health treatment and psychotherapy as a framework for bringing Indigenous approaches to healing into relationship with Western clinical approaches. In research on the treatment of intergenerational trauma and substance use disorders, Marsh et al. used a Two-Eyed Seeing decolonizing methodology to incorporate Indigenous traditional healing practices alongside the Western-developed Seeking Safety treatment model.

A contemporary application of the framework in psychotherapy is Two Eyed Healing, a practice led by Mi'kmaq therapist Trish Nicholson. Nicholson describes the practice's name and therapeutic approach as rooted in Etuaptmumk (Two-Eyed Seeing), drawing on Indigenous relational, cultural, and embodied ways of knowing alongside evidence-based Western clinical practice.
