= Sister Dorothy Moore =

Mi'kmaw educator and activist (born 1933)

Sister Dorothy Moore is a Mi’kmaw educator, Indigenous Elder, Residential School survivor, and social justice activist. She was the first Mi’kmaw person in a Roman Catholic order, entering the Sisters of St. Martha in 1954 and taking vows in 1956.

Moore was an educator in the public elementary school system in Nova Scotia, taught at the University College of Cape Breton (now Cape Breton University), and contributed to the formation of their Mi'kmaw Studies program. Moore later became the Director of Mi'kmaq Services at the Nova Scotia Department of Education where she was instrumental in the development of the Mi'kmaw language program. She was awarded the Order of Canada and has received numerous other awards including the Order of Nova Scotia and three honorary degrees, including an honorary Doctor of Laws from St. Mary's University in Halifax.

== Early Life & Education ==
Moore was born in 1933 in Membertou First Nation in Sydney, Nova Scotia. She attended an Indigenous day school in Membertou during her childhood and later attended the Shubenacadie Indian Residential School where students were prohibited from speaking the Mi’kmaw language.

Moore returned to Membertou and attended a public school in Sydney and met a nun who helped her attend a boarding school in Mabou, Cape Breton. After graduating high school, Moore was inspired to become one of the Sisters of Saint Martha on seeing them teach in Eskasoni First Nation. In 1954, she became the first Mi'kmaw person to join the order.

== Career ==
Moore became an elementary school teacher and taught for 22 years in the public school system of Nova Scotia and took on the role of principal at Eskasoni Elementary and Junior High School in 1980.

From 1985 to 1995, she taught at the University College of Cape Breton as a faculty member and helped develop the institution's Mi’kmaw Studies program which offered courses in the Mi'kmaw language.

Moore established the first Mi'kmaw language curriculum used by the province of Nova Scotia.

More became Mi'kmaq Education Consultant in the Nova Scotia Department of Education and Culture in 1995 before serving as Director of Mi’kmaq Services in 1999.

== Personal life ==
In the documentary Sister Dorothy Moore: A Life of Courage, Determination and Love, Moore described her experiences at residential school, including being punished because she could not understand English to do mathematics. She said the experience left a lasting impression that remained with her throughout her life.

Despite her treatment by nuns in residential school, Moore says she was "called by God" to "enter a religious life." Her place within the Sisters of St. Martha and her spiritual identity helped her become a leader, activist, and contribute to society.

== Honours ==
In 1999, Moore received a lifetime achievement award from her home community of Membertou.

In 2002, Moore received an honorary degree from MSVU and is featured on the university's Women's Wall of Honour.

Moore was awarded the Order of Nova Scotia in 2003, recognized for being a role model and for her commitment to the restoration and preservation of Mi'kmaw language and culture.

On June 29, 2005, Moore received the Order of Canada for being a champion of the Mi'kmaq, her advocacy for Mi'kmaw youth, and for her efforts to include Mi'kmaw histories in public school curricula as well as university programming.

In 2009, Moore was awarded an Honorary Doctorate of Civil Law from Saint Mary's University, Halifax, Nova Scotia.

In 2011, St. Francis Xavier University in Antigonish, Nova Scotia, established a scholarship for Mi'kmaw students enrolled full-time in their teaching program. In collaboration with Mi'kmaw Kina’matnewey, the scholarship was named the Sister Dorothy Moore Mi’kmaq Education Scholarship.

A collection of Moore's talks, prayers, presentation, and ceremonies, entitled: A Journey of Love and Hope, was published by Nimbus Press in 2022.

A documentary film entitled Sister Dorothy Moore: A Life of Courage, Determination and Love was premiered at the Atlantic Film Festival in September 2022.

In 2024, Moore received an honorary degree from St. Francis Xavier University.

The Sister Dorothy Moore L’nu Resource Centre, located in the Beaton Institute of Cape Breton University, was named in her honour.
