= Pierre Maillard =

French-born priest (c. 1710–1762)

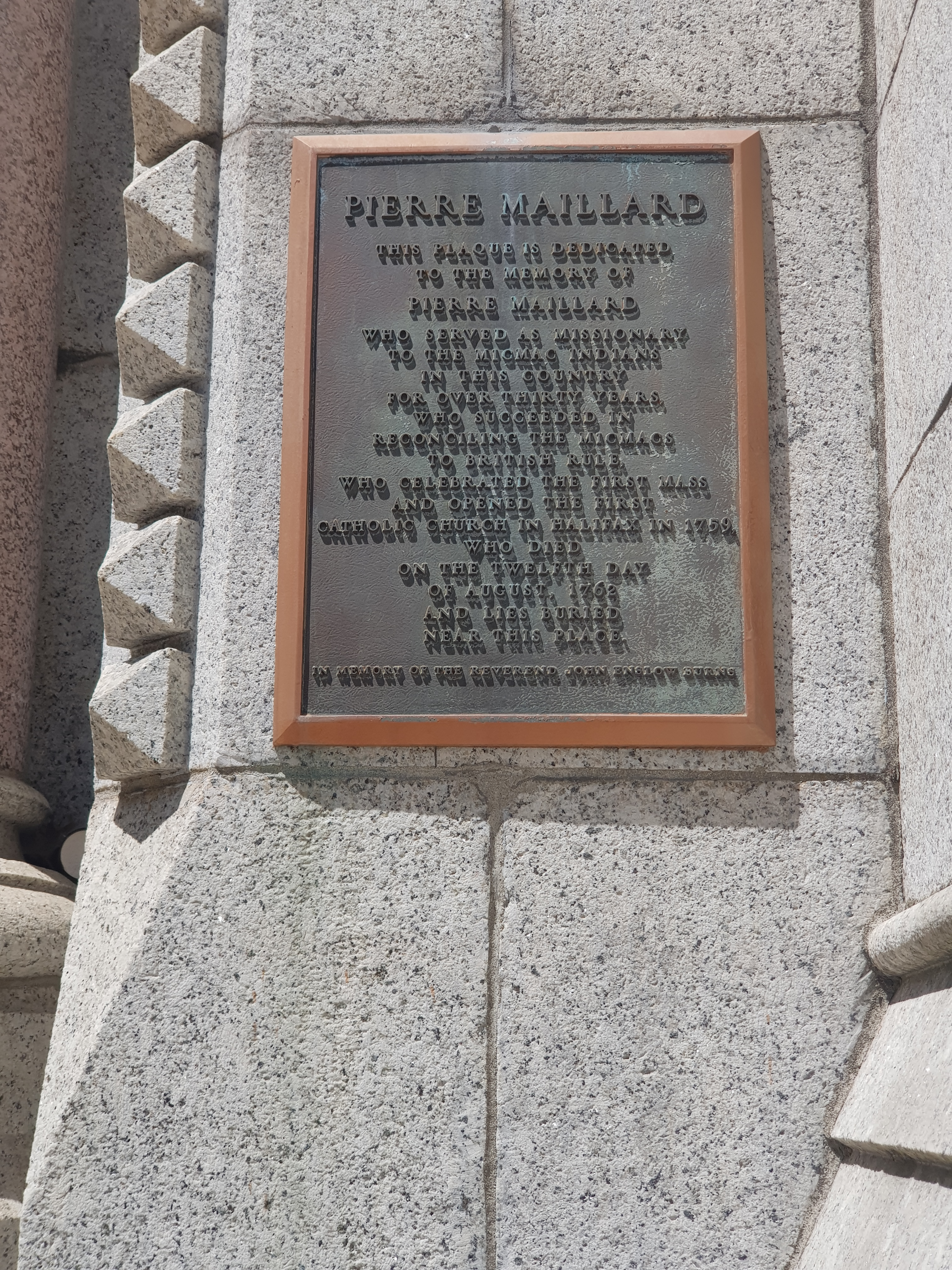
Pierre Maillard, negotiator for the Mi'kmaq, plaque, St. Mary's Basilica (Halifax), Nova Scotia. He is reported to be buried on the grounds of St. Paul's Church (Halifax).

Abbé Pierre Antoine Simon Maillard (French pronunciation: [pjɛʁ majaʁ]; c. 1710 – 12 August 1762) was a French-born priest. He is noted for his contributions to the creation of a writing system for the Mi'kmaq people of Île Royale, New France (now Cape Breton Island, Canada). He is also credited with helping negotiate a peace treaty between the British and the Mi'kmaq that resulted in the Burying the Hatchet ceremony (Nova Scotia). He was the first Catholic priest in Halifax, Nova Scotia, and is buried in the St. Peter's Cemetery, in Downtown Halifax.

== Early life and career ==
Maillard was born in the diocese of Chartres, France, around 1710. He received his ecclesiastical training at the Séminaire de Saint-Esprit, in Paris. In 1734, the Abbé de L'Isle-Dieu selected Maillard in a group of seminarists lent to the Séminaire des Missions Étrangeres, which was short of personnel. After eight months in that institution, Maillard was selected in 1735 for the Mi'kmaq missions on Île Royale (now Cape Breton Island). His recommendation letter stated that "he is a young priest who has greatly edified us. ...full of zeal and piety."

Maillard arrived at Fortress Louisbourg on the ship Rubis on 13 August 1735. He worked extensively with the Mi'kmaq people. He became a witness to and eventually a reluctant participant in the ongoing struggles between the French and the British forces for control of the area.

Maillard quickly immersed himself in learning and becoming proficient in the language of the natives. He also devoted himself to missionary work by visiting all the settlements on Île Royale, Île Saint-Jean (now called Prince Edward Island) and English Acadia (now called Nova Scotia). He pleaded for additional assistance from his French superiors, who responded by sending Jean-Louis Le Loutre. The two worked together on developing the written language.

In 1740, Maillard was appointed Bishop of Quebec's vicar-general for Île Royale. In 1742, the position created friction between his superiors and the provincial of the Recollets of Brittany, who wanted his men to be independent of Maillard's control. Maillard took every opportunity to criticize the conduct of those workers. His severity led Duquesnel (Le Prévost) and François Bigot to demand Maillard's recall, but Maillard's superior, Bishop Pontbriand, reached a compromise by dividing the vicar general's powers between Maillard and the superior of the Recollets in Louisbourg. That arrangement continued until 1754, when Pontbriand confirmed Maillard in his functions as vicar general, which he exercised alone from then on.

== King George's War ==
Along with Abbe Le Loutre, Maillard was involved in supporting the Mi'kmaq, the French, and the Acadians throughout King George's War. Maillard was present when Annapolis Royal was under siege, and after the fall of Louisbourg in June 1745, he encouraged Mi'kmaq warriors to mount raids against British forces.

In the closing months of 1745, the British captured Maillard and sent him to Boston. From there, he was deported to France. However, he quickly in 1746 returned to Acadia on with the Duc d'Anville expedition, which was co-ordinated with Father Le Loutre. He took active part in the military campaigns during the winter of 1746-1747 that were directed by Jean-Baptiste-Nicolas-Roch de Ramezay such as the Battle of Grand Pré.

== Father Le Loutre's War ==
During Father Le Loutre's War, Maillard encouraged the Mi'kmaq declaration of war against the British. He was involved with resisting the founding of Halifax, Nova Scotia, in the summer of 1749. In an attempt to remove his influence from the ongoing events in the area, Halifax Governor Edward Cornwallis tried to persuade Maillard to retire to Minas Basin. In apparent response to that pressure, King Louis XV awarded Maillard an 800 livre annual pension in 1750, and another assistant, Abbé Jean Manach, was dispatched to assist Maillard with his workload. From his mission on Île de la Sainte-Famille, Maillard continued to incite his Mi'kmaq contacts to a state of war until 1758.

To assist the religious efforts, Maillard self-financed construction of buildings from 1754 on Île de la Sainte-Famille (now Chapel Island) in the south of Grand Lac de La Brador, where his main mission was located. He received a reimbursement of 3,000 French livres in March 1757.

== French and Indian War ==
During the French and Indian War, Maillard relocated to Malagomich (now Merigomish, Nova Scotia) to escape the ever-increasing British presence in 1758. He was still there on 26 November 1759, when he and several other French missionaries accepted an offer of peace from British Major Alexander Schomberg, In light of that acceptance, the French military officer Jean-François Bourdon de Dombourg dispatched an accusatory dossier against the missionaries to the French governor of the Canada, who thereupon accused the missionaries of treason and dispatched in spring 1760 a military officer to Restigouche to investigate. To that officer, Maillard sent a letter detailing the near-hopeless situation of the Mi'kmaq in which he opened "by summing up 23 years... spent in this country in the service of our Religion and our Prince." He had indeed treated for peace with the British because of the hopeless situation, as he tried to explain.

Shortly afterward, Maillard accepted an invitation from Nova Scotia Governor Charles Lawrence to travel to Halifax and to assist in pacifying the Mi'kmaq peoples. He became a British official ("Government Agent to the Indians" with an annual salary of £150). He asked for and received permission to maintain an oratory at a Halifax battery, where he held Catholic services for the Acadians and the Mi'kmaqs in the area. In his official capacity, Maillard obtained the agreement from most of the tribal chiefs to sign peace treaties with the British in Halifax.

== Death ==
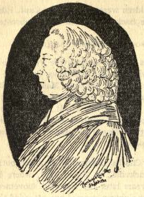
Reverend Thomas Wood at St. Paul's Church (Halifax) (1751-1764)

In July 1762 Maillard fell seriously ill. On 12 August, he died and was attended, at his request, by the Anglican clergyman Thomas Wood. Maillard was accorded a state funeral by the Nova Scotia governor; his pallbearers included the Council President and the Speaker of the Assembly. The government thus recognized his role in negotiating peace treaties between the Mi'kmaq and the British (see Burying the Hatchet ceremony (Nova Scotia)) and his forceful personality. Maillard was buried in an unmarked grave in the Old Burying Ground, in Downtown Halifax.

After the St. Peter's Cemetery opened in 1784 as Halifax's first Catholic cemetery, Maillard's grave was moved to St. Peter's, where it remains unmarked today under the parking lot that was built on top of the cemetery.

Reverend Wood wrote of Maillard:

"He was a very sensible, polite, well bred man, an excellent scholar and a good sociable companion, and was much respected by the better sort of people here as it appeared."

Maillard gave all his belongings away prior to his death. Most of his books were donated to recognized collections of the time. His other belongings were bequeathed to Louis Petitpas, his only companion and confidential agent since 1749 and in whose home he lived in Halifax.

== Legacy ==
As soon as Maillard arrived in Louisbourg, he immersed himself in studying the native language under the tutelage of his predecessor the Abbé de Saint-Vincent. Having a remarkable talent for languages, he succeeded within a few months in mastering the difficult-to-pronounce oral language, and during the winter of 1737-38 perfected a system of hieroglyphics to transcribe Mi'kmaq words. He used these symbols to write formulas for the principal prayers and the responses of the faithful in the catechism so that his followers might learn them more readily. In that development, he was greatly aided by Jean-Louis Le Loutre, another French missionary. Le Loutre marveled at Maillard's achievements in his later reports:

"... naturalized Indian as regards language.... [he succeeded in acquiring the gift of rhyming at each member of a sentence, being able to]... speak Micmac with as much ease and purity as do their women who are the most skilled in this style."

Scholars generally agree that Maillard did not invent Mi'kmaq hieroglyphics. In 1691, Father Chrétien Le Clercq reported that he had devised a similar method to catechize the Mi'kmaq inhabitants of the Gaspé Peninsula; apparently, he had systemized and expanded the Mi'kmaq custom of setting down short messages by using pictograms. There is no direct evidence that Maillard was aware of Le Clercq's work; in any event, Maillard's work is outstanding in that he left numerous works in the language, which continued in use among the Mi'kmaq into the 20th century.

== See also ==
- Étienne Bâtard
- Military history of Nova Scotia
