= CICU-FM =

Radio station at the Eskasoni First Nation, Nova Scotia

Coordinates: 45°55′52″N 60°38′35″W

- Eskasoni First Nation, Nova Scotia; Canada
- Frequency: 94.1 MHz
- Branding: CICU 94.1 FM

Programming
- Format: community radio

Ownership
- Owner: Greg Johnson

History
- First air date: August 1994

Technical information
- Class: VLP
- ERP: 1 watt vertical polarization only
- HAAT: 15 meters (49 ft)

Links
- Website: cicuradio.ca

CICU-FM is a Canadian radio station broadcasting at 94.1 MHz from the Eskasoni First Nation on Cape Breton Island in Nova Scotia. The station broadcasts a community radio format and plays a variety of music, including classic rock, country, etc.

The station received its license from the CRTC on December 23, 1993 and went on the air in 1994.
