= Ray Ivany =

Canadian executive

Raymond E. Ivany ONS OC is a Canadian executive. He was the president and CEO of Nova Scotia Community College, executive vice president at Cape Breton University, and president and vice-chancellor of Acadia University.

== Early life and education ==
Ivany was born and raised in Cape Breton Island, Nova Scotia. He earned his Bachelor of Arts degree and a Diploma in Engineering Technology from Cape Breton University and a Master of Science in Environmental Health degree from East Tennessee State University. From there, Ivany was a Research Fellow at Harvard University's Department of Environmental Science and Physiology within the Harvard T.H. Chan School of Public Health.

== Career ==
Upon concluding his fellowship at Harvard, Ivany served as director of the Centre for Occupational Health and Safety at the University College of Cape Breton (UCCB) from 1986 to 1988. Following this, he was named executive vice president of UCCB, renamed Cape Breton University, from 1994 to 1998 and president and CEO of Nova Scotia Community College. In 2007, Ivany was appointed chair of the Workers' Compensation Board as a result of his experience in occupational safety. Two years later, Ivany was appointed to a six year term as President and Vice-Chancellor of Acadia University. While serving in this role, he increased student enrollment and extended relationships with governments and community organizations. Ivany was subsequently recognized as a Top 50 CEO in Atlantic Canada by the Atlantic Business Magazine. As a result of his achievements, Ivany's term as President and Vice-Chancellor was renewed for five more years in 2014.

During his second term as President and Vice-Chancellor, Ivany was named one of Canada's Most Admired CEOs for 2016 by Waterstone Human Capital. He was also named Person of the Year by Halifax Chamber of Commerce and recognized by the Public Policy Forum. In February 2016, Ivany announced he would step down as President and Vice-Chancellor two years earlier than expected due to health issues. Prior to his retirement, Ivany was recognized by the Public Policy Forum for his "inspirational work in improving government, business and civil society in our country." He was also awarded the inaugural Arthur L. Irving Medal of Commitment for his help in defining Acadia's "unique and eminent position among Canadian post-secondary institutions." In recognition of his impact on the Nova Scotia Community College, the leadership voted to rename its flagship metro campus "The Raymond E. Ivany Campus" in 2017. Likewise, he was a recipient of the Order of Nova Scotia for his career focused on higher education and public policy. As a result of his leadership experience, Ivany was appointed to the Bank of Canada's Board of Directors in September 2018. Near the conclusion of 2020, Ivany was also named a Member of the Order of Canada.
