= Thomas Wood (reverend) =

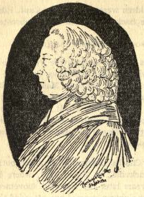
Reverend Thomas Wood

Thomas Wood (1711 – 14 December 1778) was a minister for the Church of England at St. Paul's Church, Halifax, Nova Scotia (1752–64). After 1746, he served as a surgeon in Commander William Shirley's regiment during the occupation of Louisbourg. In August 1752, with Governor Edward Cornwallis's approval, Wood arrived in Halifax and became an assistant at St. Paul's. In July 1766, Wood gave a sermon in the Mi'kmaq language in which the service was attended by many Mi'kmaq people and other dignitaries. In 1767, Wood conducted the marriage of the son of a Mi'kmaq chief. In 1769, Wood wrote about his missionary work on the Saint John River and giving prayers in Mi'kmaq.

He died at Annapolis Royal and is buried at Garrison Cemetery (Annapolis Royal, Nova Scotia).

== Other reading ==
- Herbert Lee, An historical sketch of the first fifty years of the Church of England in the province of New Brunswick (1783–1833), Saint John, N.B., 1880
- F. Pascoe, Two Hundred Years of the S.P.G., an Historical Account of the Society for the Propagation of the Gospel in Foreign Parts, 1701–1900, London, 1901
- O. Raymond, History of the St John River, AD 1604–1784, Saint John, N.B., 1905
- Thomas Wood. A sermon occasioned by the death of ... mrs. Abigail Belcher. 13 October 1771
