= Neil Libbey =

American-Canadian historian

Neil F. Libbey is an author and historian in Sydney, Nova Scotia, a community in the Cape Breton Regional Municipality.

== Personal ==
Born in Hollywood, California, and raised in San Dimas, he moved to Cape Breton in 1985.

Libbey is a graduate of the University College of Cape Breton and the University of Maine, and is a teacher by trade.

== Professional ==
Libbey authored Portside: An Early History of the Royal Cape Breton Yacht Club in 2003 and contributed articles to The Encyclopedia of Yacht Designers published in 2005.

== Books ==
- Neil F. Libbey (2003). Portside: An Early History of the Royal Cape Breton Yacht Club. Sydney, NS: City Printers. ISBN 0-9733429-0-0.
- Lucia Del Sol Knight, Daniel Bruce MacNaughton (2005). The Encyclopedia of Yacht Designers. New York: W. W. Norton. ISBN 0-393-04876-4.
