= Unama'ki Institute of Natural Resources =

Organization

The Unama'ki Institute of Natural Resources (UINR) is an Indigenous led non-profit organization located in the Mi'kmaw community of Eskasoni on Unama’ki (Cape Breton Island), Nova Scotia, Canada.

UINR serves the five Mi'kmaw communities in Unama'ki–Eskasoni, Membertou, Potlotek, Wagmatcook, and Waycobah. Since its formation in 1999, the UINR Board of Directors has been made up of the five Unama’ki Chiefs.

== Overview ==
UINR is responsible for Mi'kmaw natural resources and overseeing environmental issues in Cape Breton. Education of and enforcing policies for commercial fisheries, forestry services, and resource management are among UINR's primary duties. Further areas of focus include aquatic research and stewardship, native species management, traditional Mi’kmaq knowledge, conserving all protected areas, monitoring of water quality, and establishing environmental partnerships.

The guiding principle that directs all of the work at UINR is a concept called Netukulimk, meaning the use of the natural bounty provided by the Creator for the self-support and well-being of the individual and the community. It is about achieving adequate standards of community nutrition and economic well-being without jeopardizing the integrity, diversity or productivity of our environment.

UINR's integration of scientific research with Mi'kmaw traditional knowledge, practice and understanding makes UINR unique. UINR has signed Memorandum of Understandings to work together with many organizations including Environment Canada and Fisheries and Oceans Canada.

As stated on the UINR official website, the three goals of the organization are governance, Two-Eyed Seeing, and partnerships. The goal of governance lies in making networks for support and policy-enforcement available to enable equal participation of Mi’kmaq in natural resource management in Unama’ki and traditional territory. Two-Eyed Seeing, known as Etuaptmumk, integrates Netukulimk with traditional and conventional ways of understanding. Partnerships simply means to network with other groups who share similar goals, of conserving and protecting all natural resources for future generations.
