= Eskasoni 3A =

Coordinates: 45°57′15″N 60°34′28″W

Eskasoni 3A in Nova Scotia

Eskasoni 3A is a Mi'kmaq reserve located in Cape Breton County, Nova Scotia.

It is administratively part of the Eskasoni First Nation.
