= Holy Angels High School =

High school in Nova Scotia, Canada

Coordinates: 46.142885°N 60.196389°W

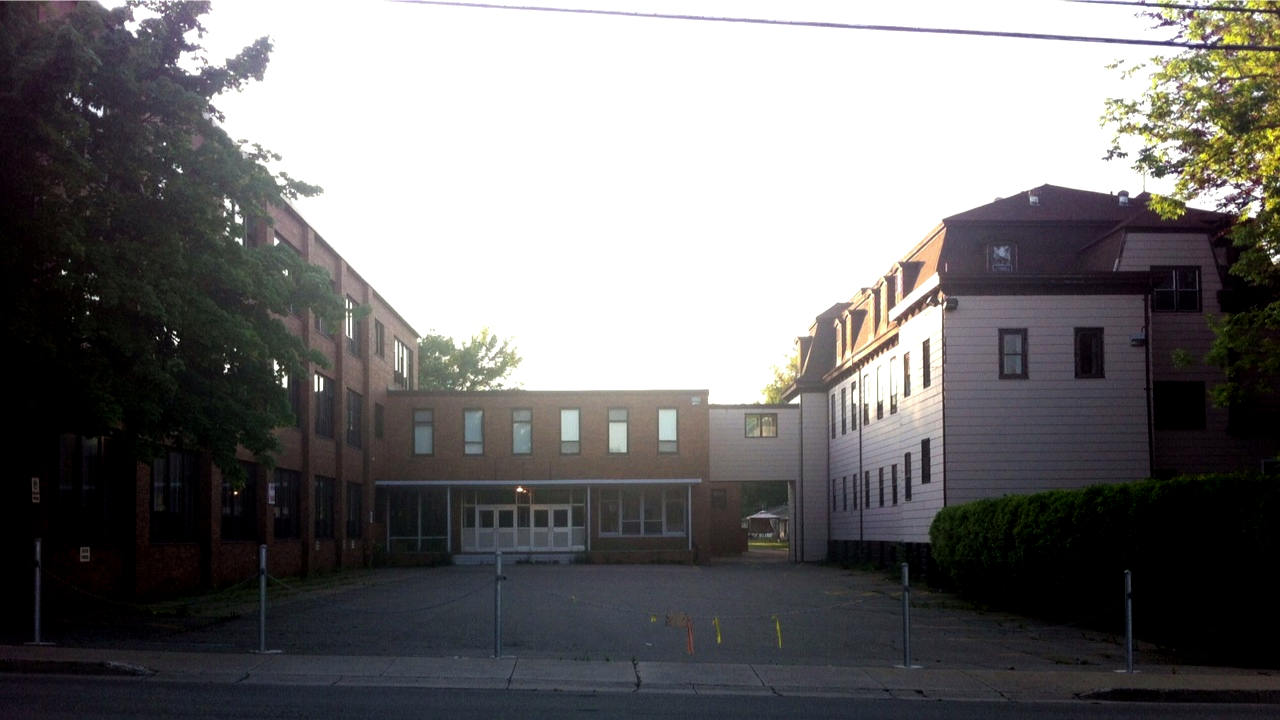
This is a photo of the main entrance to Holy Angels High School in Sydney, Nova Scotia. The school was permanently closed in June 2011 though was renovated into an arts and culture centre

Holy Angels was an all-girls high school located in Sydney, Nova Scotia, Canada. It was founded in 1885 by the Sisters of the Congregation of Notre Dame. They bestowed the school with the Latin motto: Angelis Suis Mandavit De Te meaning "He has entrusted you to the care of his angels".

Holy Angels High School was the only publicly funded all-girls school east of Montreal. It encompassed Grades 10 to 12 and serviced students from all over Cape Breton Island and beyond.

On Thursday, October 28, 2010, the Cape Breton – Victoria Regional School Board announced that it would close Holy Angels High School in June 2011, prompting 200 students to picket outside the board's offices. The school board leased the school from the Sisters of the Congregation of Notre Dame, which planned to sell the property in 2011. The school board said the Nova Scotia Department of Education could not afford to purchase the school from the order. The school closed in June 2011.
