= Miꞌkmaq language =

Eastern Algonquian language

Miꞌkmaq
- Miꞌkmawiꞌsimk
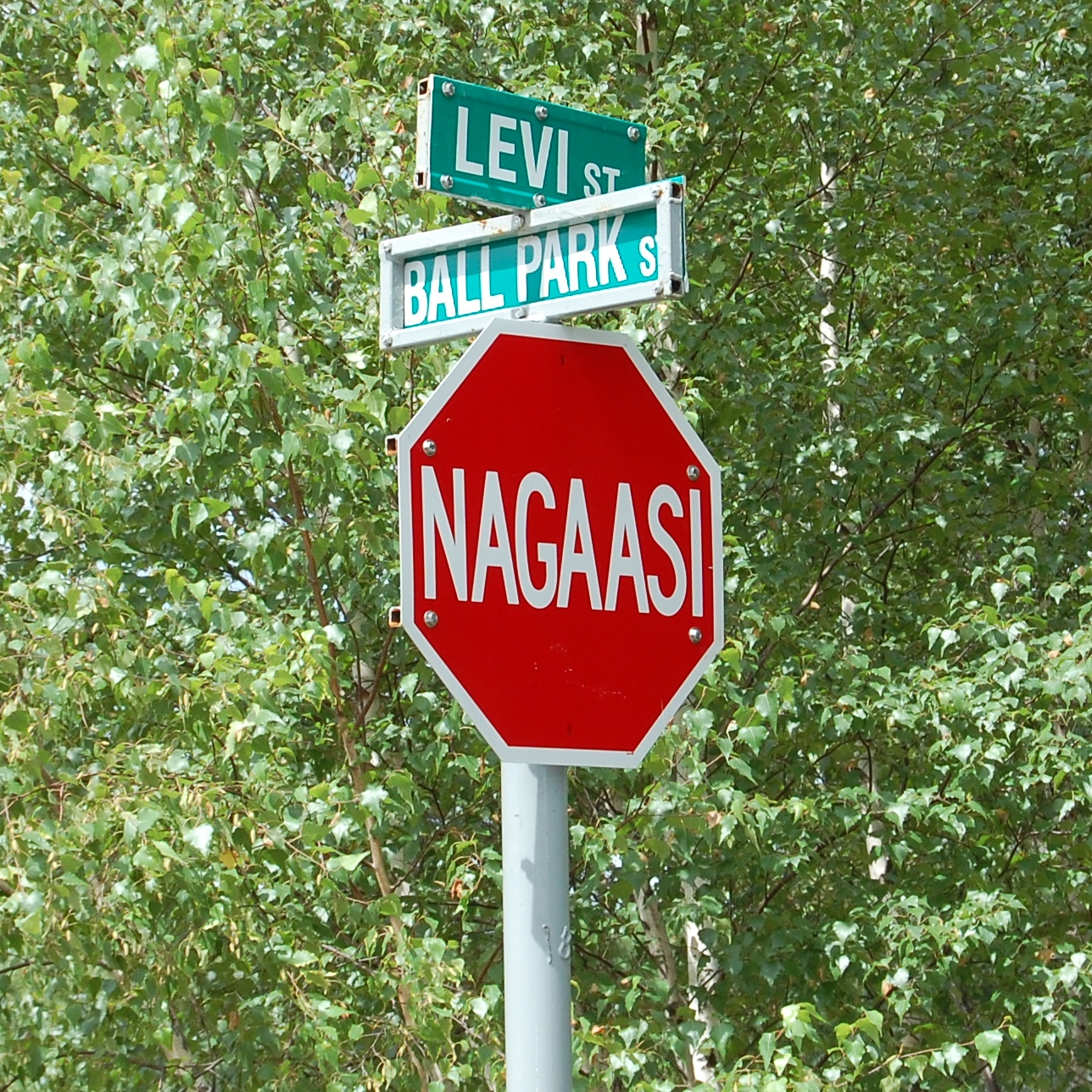
- A stop sign in Miꞌkmaq, Elsipogtog First Nation, New Brunswick, Canada
- Pronunciation: [miːɡmax]
- Native to: Miꞌkmaꞌki, Wabanakia; Canada; United States
- Region: Nova Scotia, New Brunswick, Prince Edward Island, Gaspé Peninsula, Anticosti Island, Newfoundland, northern Maine
- Ethnicity: 168,420 Miꞌkmaq (2016 census)
- Native speakers: 7,140, 4% of ethnic population (2016 census)
- Language family: Algic: Algonquian; Eastern Algonquian; Miꞌkmaq
- Writing system: Latin script; Gomgwejuiꞌgasit (historically)

Official status
- Official language in: Canada: Nova Scotia
- Recognised minority language in: Canada: New Brunswick; Prince Edward Island

Language codes
- ISO 639-2: mic
- ISO 639-3: mic
- Glottolog: mikm1235
- ELP: Mi'kmaq

niꞌkmaq / lꞌnuk "my friends" / "people"
- Person: Miꞌkmaw (Lꞌnu)
- People: Miꞌkmaq (Lnuꞌk)
- Language: Miꞌkmawiꞌsimk
- Country: Miꞌkmaꞌki; Wapnaꞌki

Miꞌkmaq Vertical Flag

Miꞌkmaq (/ˈmɪɡmɑː/ MIG-mah; Mi'kmaq: [miːɡmax]) is an Eastern Algonquian Indigenous language spoken by nearly 11,000 Miꞌkmaq in Canada and the United States; the total ethnic Miꞌkmaq population is roughly 20,000.

The native name of the language is Lnuismk, Miꞌkmawiꞌsimk or Miꞌkmwei (in some dialects). The word Miꞌkmaq is a plural word meaning 'my friends' (singular miꞌkm); the adjectival form is Miꞌkmaw. Miꞌkmaq has historically been spelled and pronounced Micmac /ˈmɪkmæk/ in English. Contemporary spellings include Migmaw and Mikmaw in English, and Míkmaq, Míkmaw and Mìgmao in Miꞌkmaq.

== History and classification ==
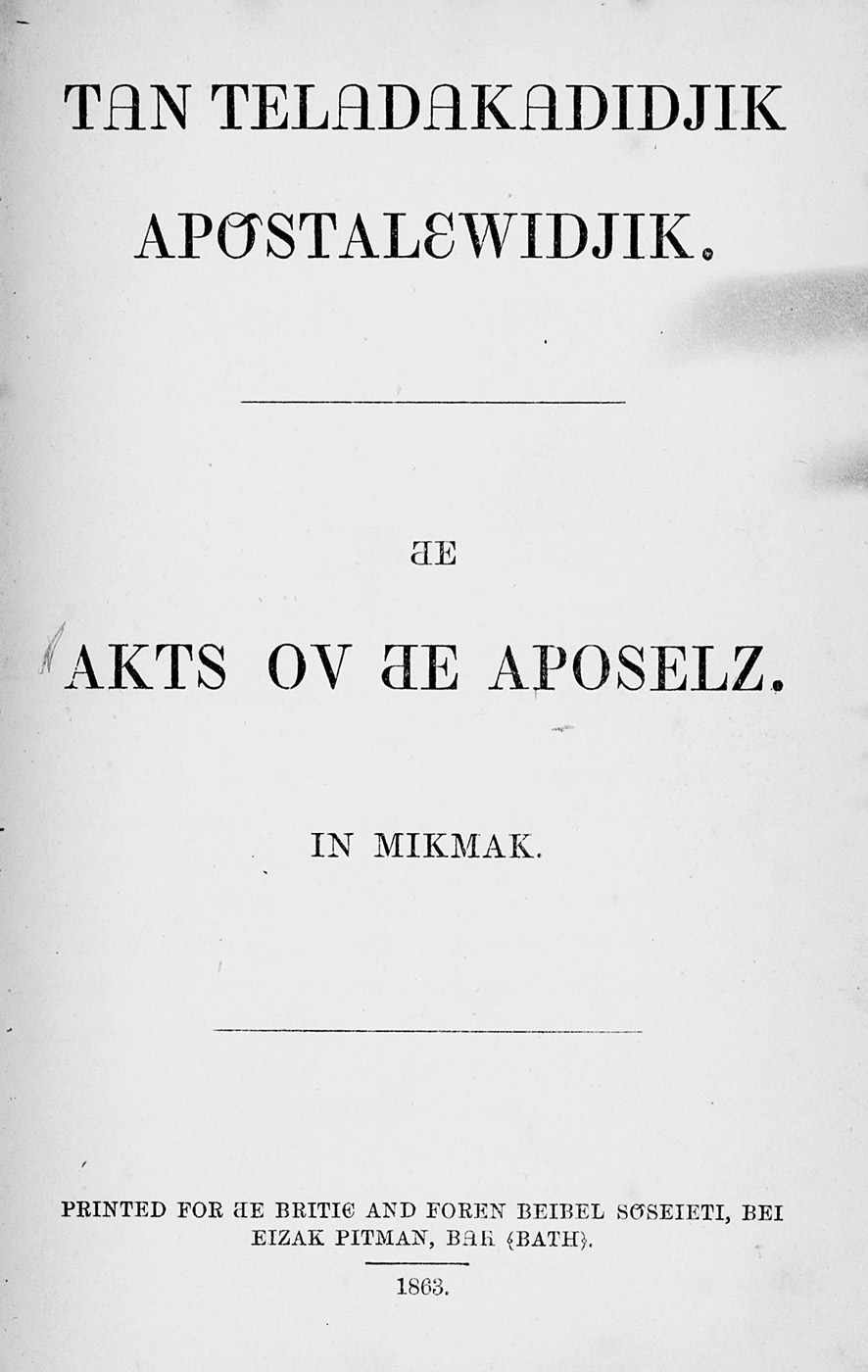
The Bible in the Miꞌkmaq language, Isaac Pitman's edition of 1863

Miꞌkmaq is one of the Algic languages, a family that once spanned from a small portion of California across Central Canada, the Midwestern United States, and the northeastern coast of North America. Within this family, Miꞌkmaq is part of the Eastern Algonquian subgroup spoken largely along the Atlantic coast. It is closely related to several extant languages, such as Malecite-Passamaquoddy, Massachusett and Munsee as well as extinct languages like Abenaki and Unami. Beyond having a similar language background and sharing close geographic proximity, the Miꞌkmaq notably held an alliance with four other tribes within the Eastern Algonquian language group known as the Wabanaki Confederacy: in short, a history of long-term language contact has existed between Miꞌkmaq and its close linguistic relatives.

Miꞌkmaq has many similarities with its fellow Eastern Algonquian languages, including multiple word cognates: for instance, compare the Miꞌkmaq word for 'woman', eꞌpit, to the Maliseet ehpit [æpit], or the varying related words for the color 'white': wapeꞌt in Miꞌkmaq, wapi [wapi] in Maliseet, waapii [wapi] in Munsee, wôbi [wɔ̃bɪ] in Abenaki and wòpe [wɔpe] in Unami. Even outside of the Eastern Algonquian subgroup, there exist similar cognates within the larger Algic family, such as the Cree wāpiskāw [wɔ:bɪska:w] and the Miami-Illinois waapi [wa:pi].

Like many Native American languages, Miꞌkmaq uses a classifying system of animate versus inanimate words. The animacy system in general is common, but the specifics of Miꞌkmaq's system differ even from closely related Algic languages. For instance, in Wampanoag, the word for 'Sun', cone, is inanimate, but the word for 'Earth', ahkee, is animate, a fact used by some scholars to claim that the Wampanoag people were aware of the Earth's rotation around an unmoving Sun; however, in Miꞌkmaq, both the word for 'Sun', naꞌguꞌset, and the word for 'Earth', ugsꞌtqamu, are animate, and parallel cultural knowledge regarding astronomy cannot be gleaned through the language. Much like grammatical gender, the core concept of animacy is shared across similar languages while the exact connotations animacy has within Miꞌkmaq are unique.

Many Acadian French and Chiac words are rooted in the Miꞌkmaq language, due to the Acadians and Miꞌkmaq living together prior to the Expulsion of the Acadians and the British colonization of Acadia; in French-speaking areas, traces of Miꞌkmaq can also be found largely in geographical names within regions historically that were occupied by the Miꞌkmaq people, including Quebec and several towns in Nova Scotia such as Antigonish and Shubenacadie. Moreover, several Miꞌkmaq words have made their way into colonizing languages: the English words caribou and toboggan are borrowings from Miꞌkmaq. The name caribou was probably derived from the Miꞌkmaq word xalibu or Qalipu meaning 'the one who paws'. Marc Lescarbot in his publication in French in 1610 used the term caribou. Silas Tertius Rand translated the Miꞌkmaq word Kaleboo as 'caribou' in his Miꞌkmaq-English dictionary (Rand 1888:98).

The aforementioned use of hieroglyphic writing in pre-colonial Miꞌkmaq society shows that Miꞌkmaq was one of the few Native American languages to have a writing system before European contact.

Linguist Peter Bakker identified two Basque loanwords in Miꞌkmaq, presumably because of extensive trade contact between Basque sailors and Native Americans in the 16th century. The overall friendly exchanges starting in mid-16th century between the Miꞌkmaqs and the Basque whalers provided the basis for the development of an Algonquian–Basque pidgin with a strong Miꞌkmaq imprint, which was recorded to be still in use in the early 18th century.

== Language revitalization efforts and teaching ==
The Miꞌkmaq language is considered vulnerable under the UNESCO Atlas of the World's Languages in Danger scale. This means the language may not be used consistently and instead the dominant language, English, is opted for. This also means it is still somewhat commonly spoken by younger generations or children of Miꞌkmaq people. A lack of fluent Miꞌkmaq speakers is due to the cultural genocide performed by the Canadian government through the introduction of the Canadian Indian residential school system. These schools, under the notation of assimilation, forced Indigenous children to reject their cultural identity and language. This resulted in a significant number of children physically and mentally abused and without the means to speak their mother tongue.

Wagmatcook, Cape Breton, is undergoing significant efforts to revitalize the language. The community created a variety of children's books suited for a range of ages to develop Miꞌkmaq language skills as children mature. The use of Miꞌkmaq immersion schools in this area also increased the proficiency in the language for children and an improved attachment to their Indigenous identity. The immersion schools allowed children to learn their mother tongue, which increases the number of fluent speakers while still obtaining the dominant language. Community member educators also participated in a program to obtain a Certificate in Aboriginal Literacy Education that increased their fluency in the language.

Cape Breton University's Unamaꞌki College specializes "in Miꞌkmaq history, culture and education". As of 2013, "it has some 250 aboriginal students".

"Parents come to me and say they hear their children in the backseat of the car speaking Miꞌkmaq and they're excited", said the Miꞌkmaq language instructor at Lnu Siꞌpuk Kinaꞌmuokuom Miꞌkmaq school in Indian Brook. Miꞌkmaq language courses are mandatory from grades Primary to 12 at the school, which only opened six years ago. Evening classes are starting as of Oct. 2013.

Also as of 2013, Lunenburg County, Nova Scotia's Miꞌkmaq Burial Grounds Research and Restoration Association has about forty students in its Miꞌkmaq language revitalization classes, and Miꞌkmaq greetings are becoming more common in public places.

In 2021, Emma Stevens, a member of the Eskasoni First Nation, recorded a cover version of the Beatles song "Blackbird" in the language to raise awareness and help in its revitalization efforts.

== Phonology ==
The phonemic inventory of Miꞌkmaq is shown below.

=== Vowels ===
	Front		Central		Back	
	short	long	short	long	short	long
Close	i	iː			u	uː
Mid	e	eː	ə		o	oː
Open			a	aː		

=== Consonants ===
	Labial	Alveolar	Palatal	Velar	
	Labial	Alveolar	Palatal	plain	labialized
Nasal	m	n			
Plosive	p	t	t͡ʃ	k	kʷ
Fricative		s		x	xʷ
Approximant		l	j		w

The sounds of Miꞌkmaq can be divided into two groups: obstruents (/p, t, k, kʷ, t͡ʃ, s, x, xʷ/) and sonorants (/m, n, w, l, j/ and all vowels).

The obstruents have a wide variety of pronunciations. When they are located word-initially or next to another obstruent, they are voiceless [p, t, k, kʷ, t͡ʃ, s, x, xʷ]. However, when they are located between sonorants, they are voiced, and appear as [b, d, ɡ, ɡʷ, d͡ʒ, z, ɣ, ɣʷ]. When the plosives and affricate (namely /t͡ʃ/) are located word-finally, they may be aspirated and appear as [pʰ, tʰ, kʰ, kʷʰ, tʃʰ]. An example of each kind of pronunciation is given below.

Allophone	Orthography	Phonemic	Phonetic	Gloss
Voiceless	tiaꞌm	/tiaːm/	[tiaːm]	moose
Voiced	Miꞌkmaq	/miːkmax/	[miːɡmax]	Miꞌkmaq
Aspirated	sqolj	/əsxolt͡ʃ/	[əsxolt͡ʃʰ]	frog

Miꞌkmaq distinguishes between long and short vowels and consonants, with long consonants indicated in Listuguj by doubling the consonant. Beyond expanding in length, long consonants add a schwa when they precede other consonants. For instance, compare /en.mitk/ ('flow away'), written in Listuguj as enmitg with /en.nə.mit/ ('stick into'), written in Listuguj as ennmit; or, /tox.tʃu.pi.la.wek/ ('hoist'), written in Listuguj as toqjuꞌpilaweg, with /ke.si.kaw.wek/ ('loud'), written in Listuguj as gesigawweg.

Listuguj orthography occasionally begins words with consonant clusters, as in gtaꞌn ('ocean') and mgumi ('ice'). However, such clusters are pronounced over separate syllables, with a schwa preceding the cluster; for instance, gtaꞌn is pronounced /ək.taːn/ while mgumi is pronounced /əm.ku.mi/. On the other hand, word-final clusters, such as in asigetg ('instigate') are pronounced over a single syllable: compare the pronunciation of asigetg, /a.si.ketk/, with mestꞌg ('taste'), /mes.tək/.

== Grammar ==
=== Syntax ===
Miꞌkmaq uses free word order, based on emphasis rather than a traditionally fixed order of subjects, objects and verbs. For instance, the sentence "I saw a moose standing right there on the hill" could be stated "sapmiꞌk ala nemaqtꞌk na tett tiaꞌm kaqamit" ('I saw him/there/on the hill/right-there/a moose/he was standing') or "sapmiꞌk ala tiaꞌm nemaqtꞌk na tett kaqamit" ('I saw him/there/a moose/on the hill/right-there/he was standing'); the latter sentence puts emphasis on the moose by placing tiaꞌm ('moose') earlier in the utterance. Miꞌkmaq, as a polysynthetic language, has verbs which usually contain the sentence's subject and object: for instance, the aforementioned sapmiꞌk translates to 'I saw him'.

While it is thus difficult to classify Miꞌkmaq under traditional word order categories such as SVO or SOV, a more fixed aspect in the language comes in the morphology of its verbs. Certain areas of internal morphology of verbs in Miꞌkmaq have regular placement: for instance, when the aspect of a verb is included, it appears as the first prefix, while the negative marker always appears directly after the verb root. An example for both of these instances can be seen in the Miꞌkmaq verb kisipawnatqaꞌtiꞌw (kisi-paw-natq-aꞌti-w), translated as 'they cannot get out': the prefix kisi marks the verb as being in the completive aspect, whereas the negative marker, w, appears directly after the verb root aꞌti ('the two move'). However, these solidly placed elements of verbs are paired with markers that can appear throughout the word, depending again on emphasis; animacy in particular can appear fluidly throughout verbs. In short, while a few specific aspects of Miꞌkmaq can be predicted, its syntax in general is largely free and dependent on context.

Miꞌkmaq verbs are also marked for tense.

=== Nouns ===
Nouns in Miꞌkmaq are either animate or inanimate. This is a common feature among Algonquian languages. The verbs change depending on the noun's animacy. For example:

- Nemitu – 'I see (inanimate noun)'
- Nemiꞌk – 'I see (animate noun)'

== Writing system ==
Miꞌkmaq is written using a number of Latin alphabets based on ones devised by missionaries in the 19th century. Previously, the language was written in Miꞌkmaq hieroglyphic writing, a script of partially native origin. The Francis-Smith orthography used here was developed in 1974 and was adopted as the official orthography of the Míkmaq Nation in 1980. It is the most widely used orthography and is that used by Nova Scotian Mikmaq and by the Míkmaq Grand Council. It is quite similar to the "Lexicon" orthography, differing from it only in its use of the straight apostrophe ⟨ꞌ⟩ or acute accent ⟨´⟩ instead of the colon ⟨:⟩ to mark vowel length.

When the Francis-Smith orthography was first developed, the straight apostrophe (often called a "tick") was the designated symbol for vowel length, but since software applications incorrectly autocorrected the tick to a curly apostrophe, a secondary means of indicating vowel length was formally accepted, the acute accent. The barred-i ⟨ɨ⟩ for schwa is sometimes replaced by the more common circumflex-i ⟨î⟩.

In Listuguj orthography, an apostrophe marks long vowels as well as schwa, and the letter ⟨g⟩ is used instead of the letter ⟨k⟩.

The 19th-century Pacifique orthography omits ⟨w⟩ and ⟨y⟩, using ⟨o⟩ and ⟨i⟩ for these. It also ignores vowel length. The 19th-century orthography of Silas Tertius Rand, using characters from Isaac Pitman's Phonotypic Alphabet, is also given in the table below; this orthography is more complex than the table suggests, particularly as far as vowel quantity and quality is concerned, employing various letters such as 〈a〉 (backwards ⟨a⟩), 〈à〉 (backwards ⟨a⟩ with acute accent), ⟨ɛ⟩, ⟨ɛ́⟩, ⟨ɯ⟩, ⟨ɯ́⟩, ⟨ɹ̇⟩, ⟨ɹ́⟩, ⟨ơ⟩, 〈u〉 (backwards ⟨u⟩), etc.

Miꞌkmaq orthographies
IPA	a	aː	e	eː	i	iː	ə	tʃ	k	l	m	n	o	oː	p	x	s	t	u	uː	w	j
Francis-Smith	a	aꞌ/á	e	eꞌ/é	i	iꞌ/í	ɨ	j	k	l	m	n	o	oꞌ/ó	p	q	s	t	u	uꞌ/ú	w	y
Listuguj	a	aꞌ	e	eꞌ	i	iꞌ	ꞌ	j	g	l	m	n	o	oꞌ	p	q	s	t	u	uꞌ	w	y
Lexicon	a	a:	e	e:	i	i:	ɨ	j	k	l	m	n	o	o:	p	q	s	t	u	u:	w	y
Pacifique	a		e		i			tj	g	l	m	n	ô		p		s	t	o			i
Rand	ă	a â	ĕ	ā	ĭ	e	ŭ	dj tc̡	g k	l	m	n	ŏ	o ō	b p	h	s	d t	ŏ	oo u	w	y

== Number system ==
=== 1–10 ===
1	newt
2	taꞌpu
3	siꞌst
4	neꞌw
5	naꞌn
6	asꞌgom
7	lluigneg
8	ugumuljin
9	pesgunateg
10	neꞌwtisgaꞌq

Miꞌkmaq uses a decimal numeral system. Every multiple-digit number is formed by using one of the first nine numerals as a prefix or a preceding word, as seen in the number for ten, neꞌwtisgaq, a combination of the prefix neꞌwt - (derived from newt) and the root isgaꞌq, meaning ten (the pattern can be seen in tapuisgaꞌq for 20, nesisgaꞌq for 30, etc.) While 10, 20, 30, 40 and 50 all use a single word containing a prefix, the tens between 60 and 90 use the numeral as a preceding word to a separate word meaning ten, teꞌsisgaꞌq: for instance, 60 is written as asꞌgom teꞌsisgaꞌq.

Numbers between the tens are stated by multiple-word phrases, beginning with the ten-based root number, such as neꞌwtisgaq, followed by jel (meaning 'and' or 'also') and ending with one of the nine numerals: for instance, the number 28 is constructed as tapuisgaꞌq jel ugumuljin, or literally 'twenty and eight'.

For numbers beyond 99, Miꞌkmaq uses a pattern similar to that of 60 to 99, with numeral words preceding separate roots that identify higher numbers (such as gasgꞌptnnaqan, meaning 'hundred', or pituimtlnaqn meaning 'thousand'); for instance, 300 is written as siꞌst gasgꞌptnnaqan, while 2,000 is written as taꞌpu pituimtlnaqn. The exceptions to that pattern are the numbers 100 and 1,000, which are simply the roots gasgꞌptnnaqan and pituimtlnaqn, respectively. Similarly to digits between the tens, the connecting word jel is used between hundreds and tens, or thousands and hundreds: for example, the number 3,452 is written as siꞌst pituimtlnaqn jel neꞌw gasgꞌptnnaqan jel naꞌnisgaq jel taꞌpu.

On top of the basic structure, numbers in Miꞌkmaq must agree with the animacy of whatever they are counting: for instance, when speaking of two people, taꞌpusijik is used, as opposed to the number used for two days, taꞌpugnaꞌq. The suffix -ijik to denote the counting of animate subjects and the suffix -gnaꞌq to denote the counting of inanimate subjects are common, but animacy-marking suffixes are somewhat fluid and vary by number and dialect.

== Place names ==
- Amqui, from Miꞌkmaq amqui (place of amusement or pleasure)
- Aroostook County, from Miꞌkmaq meaning 'beautiful/clear water'
- Bouctouche, from Miꞌkmaq Tjipogtotjg (pronounced Chebooktoosk) meaning 'great little harbour'
- Cascapédia, from Miꞌkmaq kaska ('broad') and pegiag ('river').
- Causapscal, from Miꞌkmaq Goesôpsiag (or Gesapsgel, Gesôpsgigel), meaning 'stony bottom', 'swift water', or 'rocky point', likely referring to the rocky river bed of the Causapscal River.
- Gaspé Peninsula, from Miꞌkmaq Gespedeg ('land recently acquired')
- Gaspé, Quebec, Gespeg ('land's end')
- Kouchibouguac, New Brunswick, from Miꞌkmaq Pijeboogwek ('river of long tides')
- Matapédia, from Miꞌkmaq matapegiag ('river junction', from the parts mata ('junction') and pegiag ('river'), referring to the Matapedia River that crosses the town just before its confluence with the Restigouche River).
- Paspébiac, from Miꞌkmaq papgeg ipsigiag, meaning 'split flats' or 'lagoon'.
- Quebec, from Miꞌkmaq Gepèèg
- Restigouche, from Miꞌkmaq Listuguj
- Lac-Humqui, from Miꞌkmaq amqui (place of amusement or pleasure)
- Sayabec, from Miꞌkmaq Sakpediak
- Shediac, from Miꞌkmaq Es-ed-ei-ik, which means 'running far in' (in reference to the tide, which has a long range over the shallow, sandy beaches)
- Tatamagouche, from Takamegoochk, which means 'barred across the entrance with sand'.

A 2012 book, by the Miꞌkmaq linguist Bernie Francis and anthropologist Trudy Sable, The Language of this Land, Miꞌkmaꞌki, "examines the relationship between Miꞌkmaq language and landscape."

== Sources ==
- Maillard, M. l'abbé, redigée et mise en ordre par Joseph M. Bellenger, ptre. 1864. Grammaire de la langue mikmaque. Nouvelle-York, Presse Cramoisy de J.M. Shea. Reprinted 2007: Toronto: Global Language Press, ISBN 1-897367-14-7
- Delisle, Gilles L.; Metallic, Emmanuel L. 1976. Micmac Teaching Grammar. Preliminary version. La Macaza, Quebec: Manitou Community College.
- Pacifique, Père. 1939. Leçons grammaticales théoriques et pratiques de la langue micmaque. Sainte-Anne de Restigouche, P.Q. Reprinted 2007: Toronto: Global Language Press, ISBN 1-897367-15-5
- Rand, Silas Tertius. 1875. First reading book in the Micmac language. Halifax: Nova Scotia Printing Company (IA, GB). Reprinted 2006: Vancouver: Global Language Press, ISBN 0-9738924-8-X
- Rand, Silas Tertius. 1888. Dictionary of the language of the Micmac Indians, who reside in Nova Scotia, New Brunswick, Prince Edward Island, Cape Breton and Newfoundland. Halifax: Nova Scotia Printing Company. Reprinted 1994: New Delhi & Madra
- Sable, Trudy (2012). The language of this land, Miꞌkmaꞌki. Sydney, NS: Cape Breton University Press. ISBN 9781897009499. OCLC 773473837.s: Asian Educational Services, ISBN 81-206-0954-9
