= Eskasoni 3 =

First Nation reserve in Nova Scotia, Canada

Coordinates: 45°57′00″N 60°37′00″W

Eskasoni 3 in Nova Scotia

Eskasoni 3 (2021 population: 3,521) is a Mi'kmaq reserve located in Cape Breton County, Nova Scotia.

It is administratively part of the Eskasoni First Nation.

== Population ==
According to the 2016 census, the reservation had a population of 3,422, a 3.4% increase from 2011.

The average population density was 94.5 people/km^{2}.
