= Cheryl Bartlett =

Canadian biologist

Cheryl Bartlett CM
- Born: Duchess, Alberta

Academic background
- Education: University of Alberta

Academic work
- Discipline: Biology
- Institutions: Cape Breton University
- Main interests: Integrative science

Cheryl Marie Bartlett CM is a Canadian biologist. She is a professor emerita of biology and former Tier 1 Canada Research Chair in Integrative Science at the Department of Biology at Cape Breton University.

== Early life ==
Barlett was born and raised in Duchess, Alberta and attended Augustana University College. In 1977, Barlett earned her Bachelor of Science in Zoology at the University of Alberta before moving to Guelph for her Master's degree and PhD.

== Career ==
In 1989, Barlett accepted a placement at Cape Breton University in the biology department before moving to Toqwa’tu’kl Kjijitaqnn / Integrative Science. By 2002, she was appointed a Tier 1 Canada Research Chair (CRC) in Integrative Science. Barlett's research focused on the concept of Integrative Science, which is the practice of merging both Indigenous knowledge and Westernized Scientific Knowledge into one "Two-Eyed Seeing framework."

As a result of research with Aboriginal Knowledge, she was appointed a Member of the Order of Canada in 2011 before retiring.
