= Cape Breton University =

Public university in Sydney, Nova Scotia, Canada

Coordinates: 46°10′20.26″N 60°5′35.35″W

- Other name: CBU
- Former names: Xavier Junior College (1951); Nova Scotia Eastern Institute of Technology (1968); College of Cape Breton (1974); University College of Cape Breton (1982)
- Motto: Scottish Gaelic: Theid Díchioll Air Thoiseach, "Diligence Will Prevail"
- Motto in English: Perseverance Will Triumph
- Type: Public
- Established: 1951 (as Xavier Junior College); 1968 (as NSEIT); 1974 (as College of Cape Breton); 1982 (as University College of Cape Breton); 2005 (as Cape Breton University)
- Academic affiliations: AAU, UC, CBIE, CICan
- Endowment: $27.8M
- Chancellor: Annette Verschuren
- President: David Dingwall
- Faculty: 227 (as of March 2019)
- Administrative staff: 225 (as of March 2019)
- Students: 3,672 (Fall 2026)
- Undergraduates: 3,009
- Postgraduates: 663
- Location: P.O. Box 5300, Sydney, Nova Scotia, B1P 6L2, Canada
- Campus: Urban
- Colours: Orange, green, black, gold
- Nickname: CBU Capers
- Sporting affiliations: U Sports, AUS
- Mascot: Caper
- Website: cbu.ca

Cape Breton University (CBU) is a public university located in Sydney, Nova Scotia, Canada. It is the only post-secondary degree-granting institution within the Cape Breton Regional Municipality and on Cape Breton Island. The university is enabled by the Cape Breton University Act passed by the Nova Scotia House of Assembly. Prior to this, CBU was enabled by the University College of Cape Breton Act (amended). The University College of Cape Breton's Coat of Arms were registered with the Canadian Heraldic Authority on May 27, 1995.

CBU is an ordinary (full) member of Universities Canada (UC), the Association of Atlantic Universities (AAU), the Canadian Bureau for International Education (CBIE), and Colleges and Institutes Canada (CICan).

== History ==
In 1951, the St. Francis Xavier University Sydney Campus was opened as a satellite campus of St. Francis Xavier University in the Sydney Lyceum, situated in the central business district of Sydney, Nova Scotia. It was also referred to as "St. Francis Xavier Junior College" or "Xavier Junior College" (XJC), and colloquially as "Little X." The building was reduced to three stories due to a fire, which caused the fourth story to collapse. The college underwent an expansion in 1960, which included a new arts building along with classrooms in Holy Angels High School and Navy League buildings. In 1963 the institution was renamed Xavier College.

In 1955, Mother St. Margaret of Scotland (Sister Margaret Beaton) came to Cape Breton to become the first full librarian of Xavier Junior College. During her time at the college, she recognized that documents of historical significance to Cape Breton Island were being lost. In response, she began to grow the collection of the college library by collecting books and archival material specific to the culture and history of Cape Breton Island and the various cultural groups (e.g. Mi'kmaq, Italian, Polish, Lebanese, Gaelic) which inhabited it. In 1957 she named this collection Cape Bretoniana. In 1966 she began overseeing the collection on a full-time basis. In 1975, Cape Bretoniana was expanded and branched into two main divisions: an Archive and institute Library and the Centre for Ethnic Studies, Folklore and the Social and Cultural History of Cape Breton Island. Sister Beaton died in a car accident that same year. The collection and additional institutions built around it were renamed the Beaton Institute in her honor.

In the early 1960s, Harry Boadmore emigrated from England to Canada, where he met and later married Elizabeth 'Liz' Boardmore (née MacDonald). Both later joined Xavier Junior College as English teachers in 1966. Within that year, they collaborated with the college and community to produce a stage version of The Crucible by Arthur Miller, which was presented at the Vogue Theatre in Sydney, and a version of The Collection by Harold Pinter. The Boardmores went on the Xavier College Drama Society and host drama festivals on the top floor of the Sydney Lyceum, where Xavier Junior College was hosted at the time. This would later become the Xavier College Theatre.

In 1968, the Nova Scotia Eastern Institute of Technology (NSEIT) opened on Grand Lake Road several kilometres east of the Sydney city limits. The institution focused on business technology and trades. It was created with the help of provincial and federal funding in response to serious challenges faced by the coal and steel industries in Industrial Cape Breton. In 1974, NSEIT and Xavier College were officially amalgamated into the College of Cape Breton (CCB). The college was consolidated at the location of the former NSEIT and began expanding.

Between 1978 and 1982, several new buildings were added to the campus including a campus centre, the Sullivan Field House, an art gallery, and the current location of the Beaton Institute. In 1979, the Xavier College Drama Society moved its operations to the CCB with the construction of a new playhouse as part of college expansions. This would go on to be named the Boardmore Playhouse in honor of Liz and Harry Boardmore in 1990.

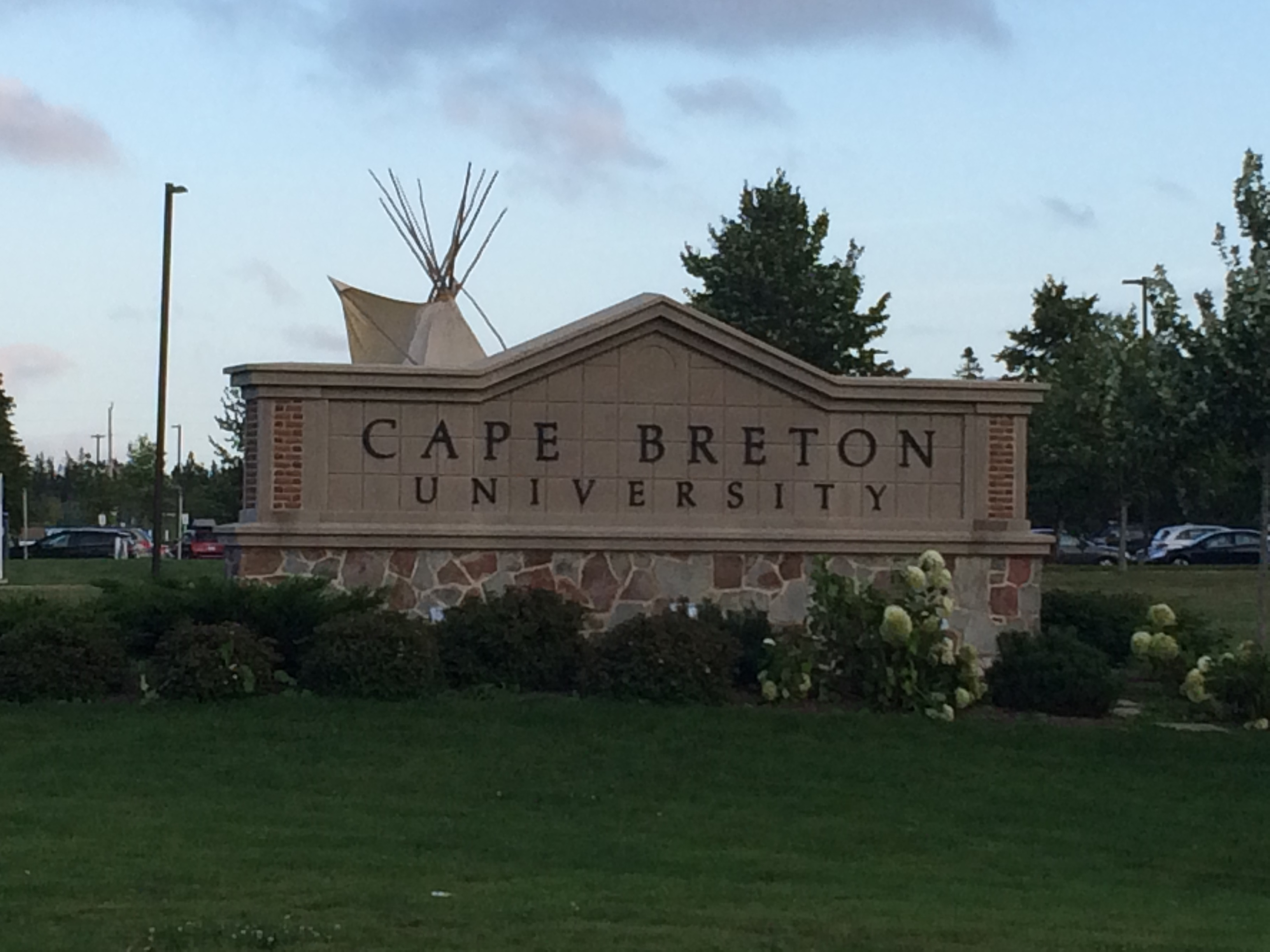
The main sign for the university, located in front of the Culture and Heritage Centre

In 1982, the Nova Scotia government granted CCB a charter for granting university degrees and the institution renamed itself as the University College of Cape Breton (UCCB). UCCB was the first university college in Canada and united diverse education streams such as the liberal arts and sciences with technological and vocational diploma programs.

A major expansion for the 1987 Canada Winter Games included the construction of sports facilities built at the campus. During the 1990s several campus expansions were built, including the Culture and Heritage Centre as well as academic and research facilities.

As a result of a 2004 study the decision was made to rename the institution to reflect its transformation over the previous two decades into primarily a university level institution. The process led to UCCB transferring its trades and technology programs to the Nova Scotia Community College (NSCC), which operated its "Marconi Campus" (the former Adult Vocational Training Centre – AVTC) which is located immediately next to the CBU Grand Lake Road campus.

On September 23, 2004, the university's Board of Governors voted unanimously to rename the institution Breton University; however, the proposed name was opposed by a number of groups in the institution and local community over the removal of the word "Cape" from the name, and the name Cape Breton University was thus adopted instead. The name change became official through the University College of Cape Breton Act (amended) which received Royal Assent on May 19, 2005.

The university is an extreme case of replacing declining domestic enrolment with international students. Growing from under 2,600 students in 2017 to 9,100 in fall 2023 with 80% of those being international. The increase in numbers has led to a rise in reported incidents of racism and criticism from their students regarding a lack of housing and other infrastructure. The death of international student Rajesh Gollapudi in 2022 house fire focused attention on the issue.

"Rise Again" is the official school song of Cape Breton University.

== Campus ==
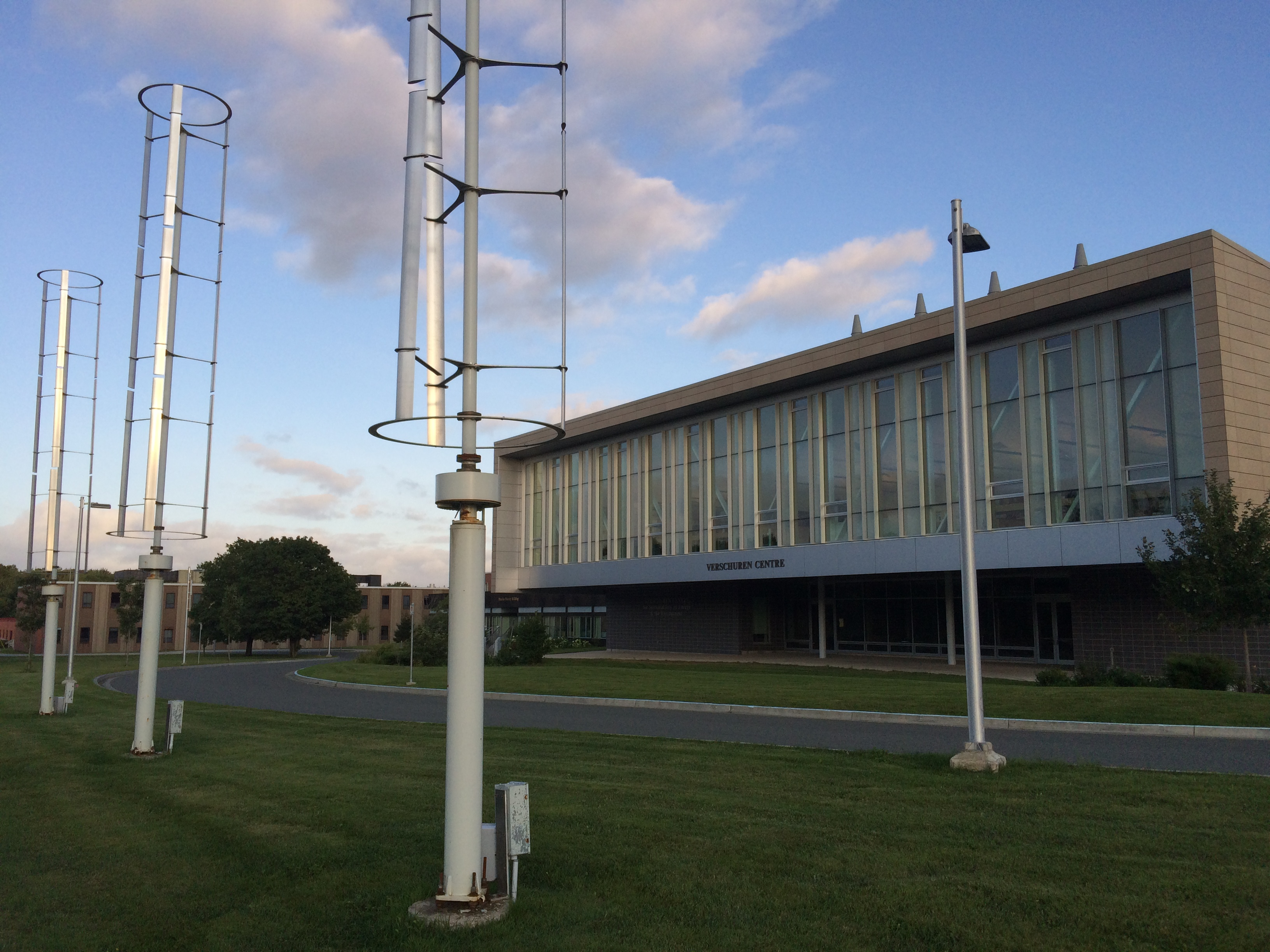
The Verschuren Centre for Sustainability & the Environment, a formerly associated not-for-profit research facility focused on green technologies.

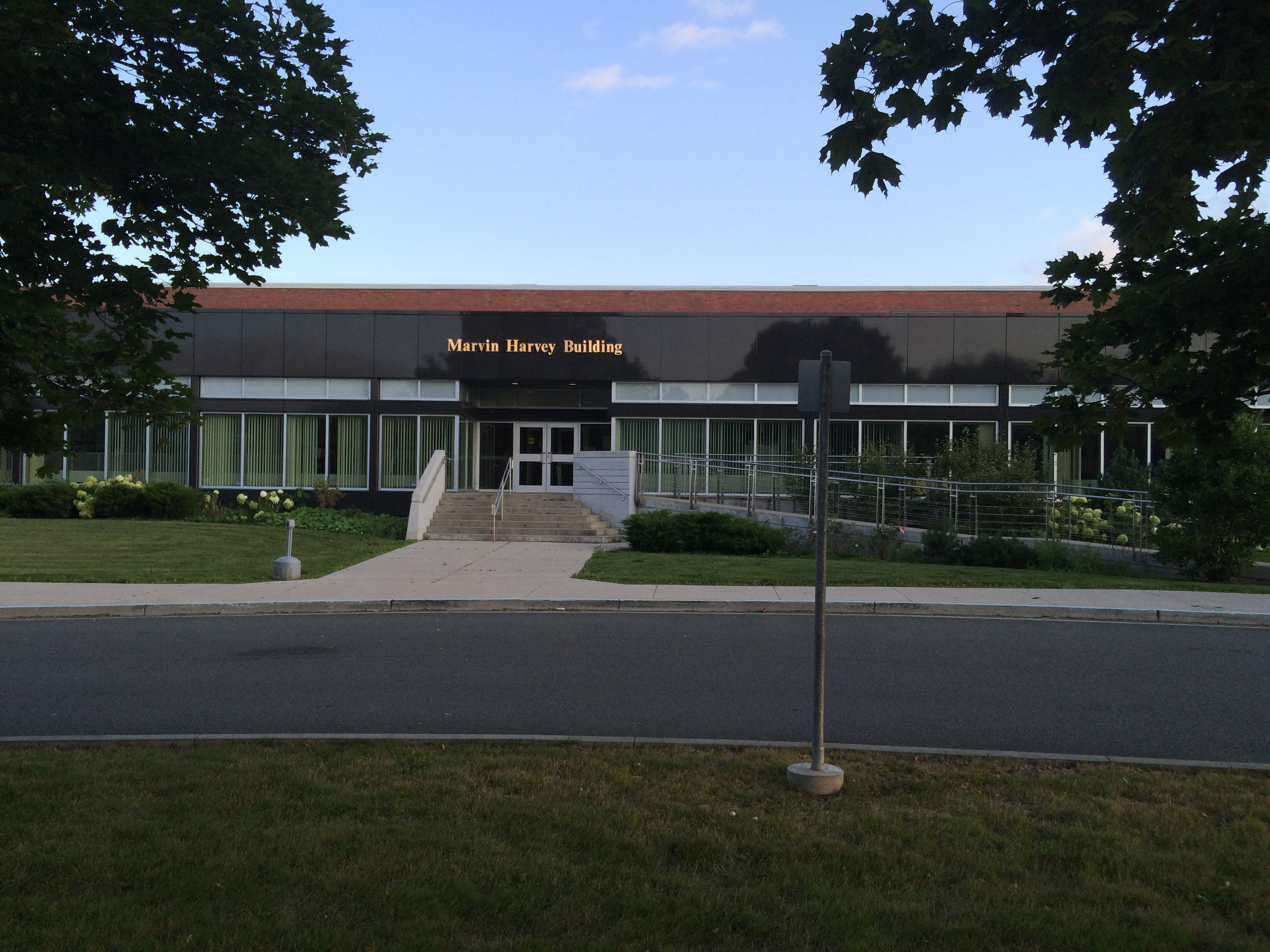
The front of the Marvin Harvey Building, which houses the Student Life Centre, the Jennifer Keeping AccessAbility Centre, and the Registrar's Office.

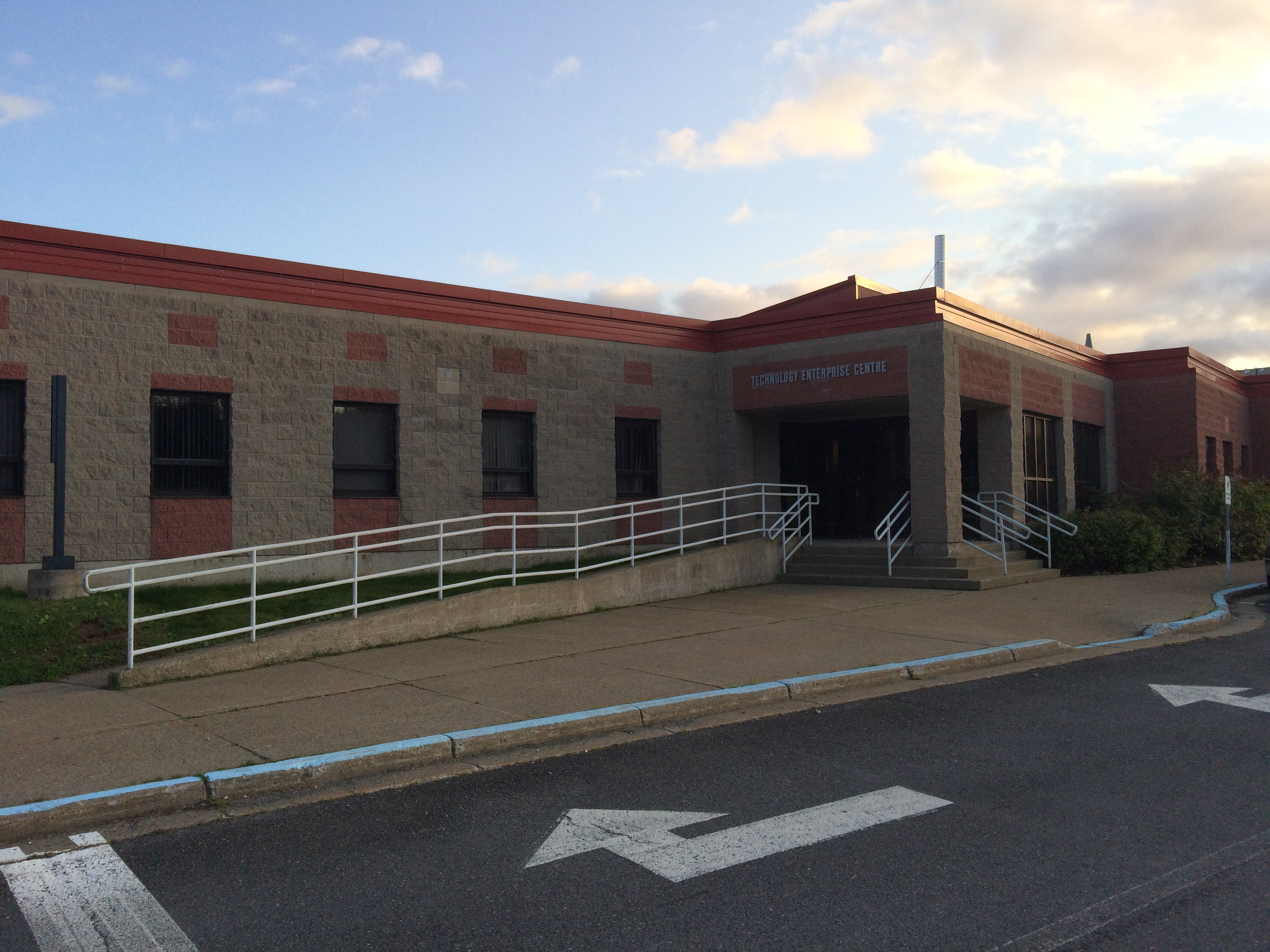
The Technology Enterprise Centre, with houses several science research laboratories.

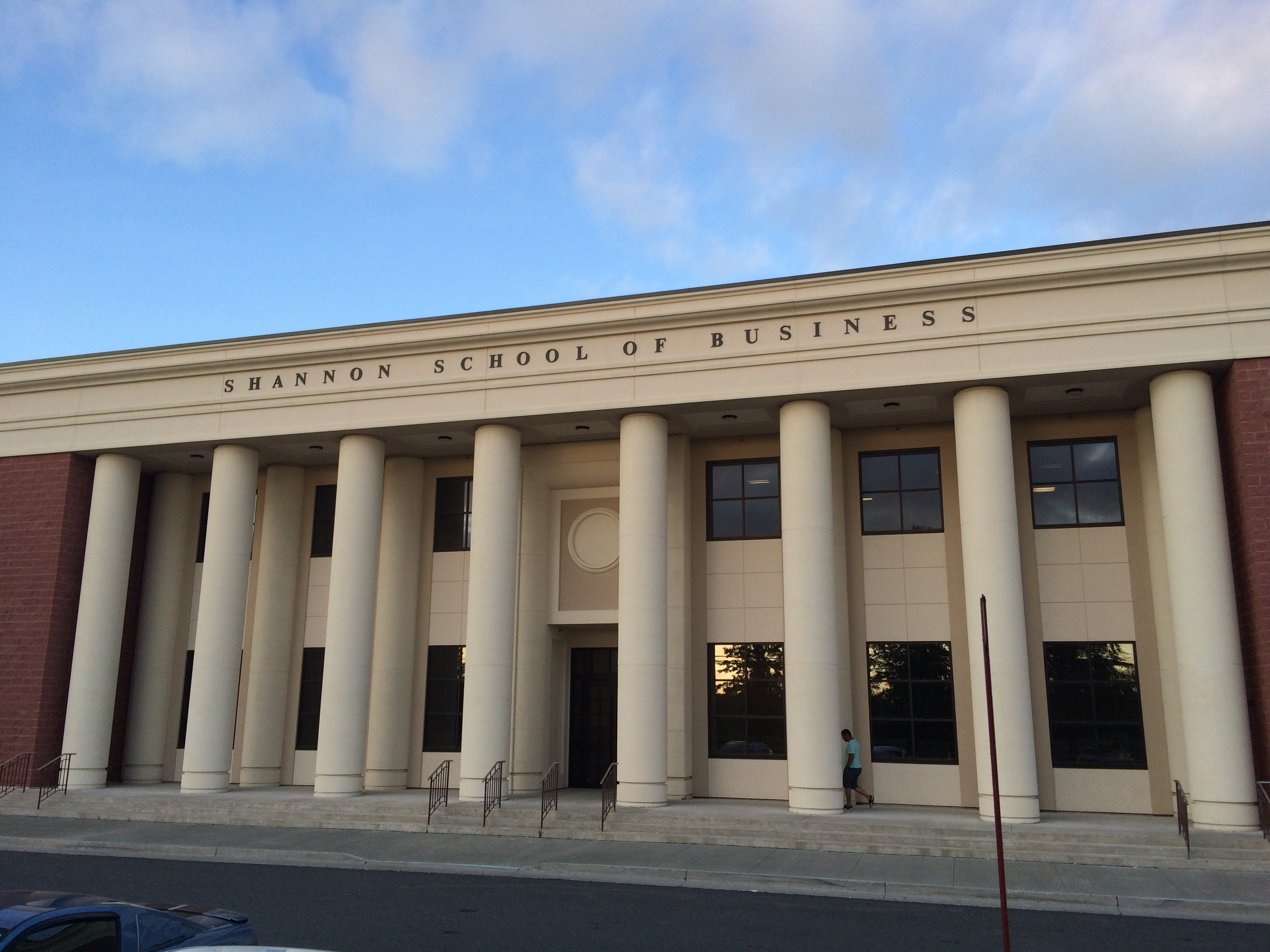
The Shannon School of Business.

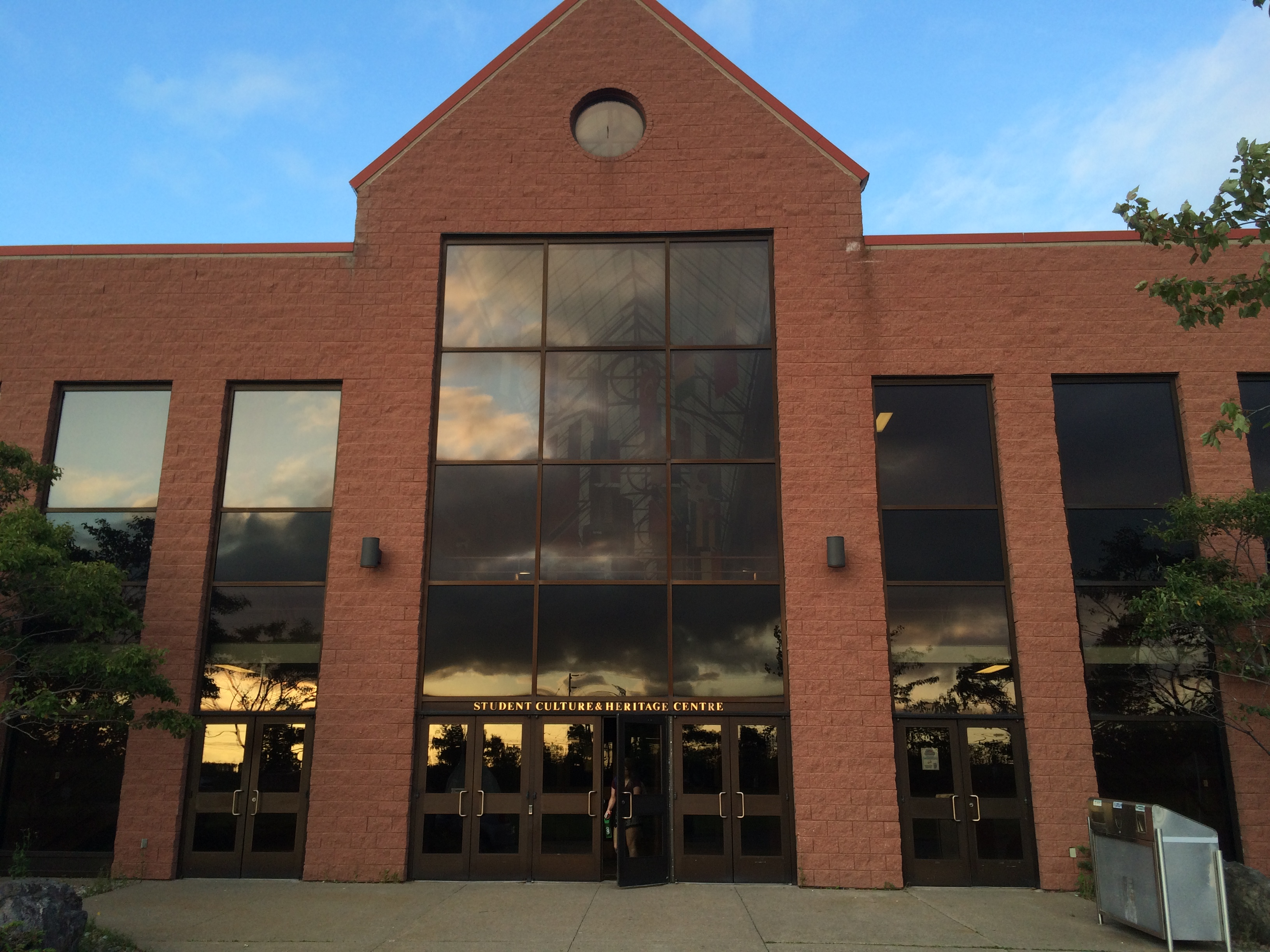
The Culture & Heritage Centre, which houses the President's Office, the Great Hall, the CBU Art Gallery, the Beaton Institute, and the Centre for Cape Breton Studies.

The Beaton Institute, housed at CBU, is the second largest public archive in Nova Scotia. Sister Margaret Beaton of Scotland, recognizing that many documents of significance to Cape Breton were being lost to neglect during her career as librarian at Xavier Junior College, began collecting these documents back in 1957. Preceded by Cape Bretoniana, the Beaton Institute operates as a regional archive from and about Cape Breton Island's history, society, politics, economy, health, people, places, and events. The building is 17,000 square feet and includes a reading room, vault, work room, and several offices and specialized rooms. The collection includes paper records, photographs, film, video, audio materials, books, maps, plans, and microfilms, housing 3,000 manuscript collections, 60,000 images, 2,500 sound recordings, 1,500 video cassettes and film reels, 1,500 reference books, 2,000 maps and plans. Materials in the collection reflect the Mi'kmaq, Jewish, Acadian, Ukrainian, African Nova Scotian, Lithuanian, Polish, and Italian communities of Cape Breton, along with a collection of Gaelic materials.

CBU's library is located adjacent to the Campus Center, along with the main cafeteria, Art Gallery 1, and Boardmore Theatre. The library features twelve special collections, apart from the main collection, including a CBU thesis repository, the Bernier LGBT Collection, the Fortress of Louisbourg Collection, and the F.A.C.E. Collection which provides access to the publications and contributions of the CBU faculty. There is also has a collection of Cape Breton Post and Chronicle Herald publications on microfilm, which can be read on the microfilm readers located on the first floor. CBU Library has access to Novanet Search, Novanet Classic, and WorldCat, allowing students to search for publications from libraries all across Nova Scotia and the world. Interlibrary loaning services are available to access publications and journal articles not held in the CBU Library's collection or accessible through CBU's electronic resources.

The university continued to expand with major campus additions initiated in 2009. As a collaborative player, CBU became a lead partner in the establishment of the Cape Breton Health Recreation Complex. The $10 million project is a newly opened health and recreation community facility situated on the CBU campus. It provides CBU students and the community with access to a track and field operation and year-round indoor soccer facilities as well as a fitness centre.

CBU is growing in terms or residence and enhanced food services through the construction of Harriss Hall, a new student residence and dining hall, in September 2010, giving the campus a total of four residences. Harriss Hall is also the new location for residence mail services, replacing MacDonald, and holds the office of the Residence Life Coordinator. With this new addition, the residence halls now offer meal service and living space for over 550 students. Recently, each dorm, along with the off-campus students, have been assigned colors and animals to represent them in residence competitions. The four residences on campus include Cabot Residence, MacDonald Residence, Harriss Hall, and Alumni Hall. MacDonald offers single and double rooms, Harriss offers single suites, Cabot offers four-bedroom apartments, and Alumni offers five-bedroom apartments along with two-bedroom dorms.

In 2010, funded by both public and private investment, construction began on the Verschuren Centre for Sustainability in Energy & Environment (CSEE). The purpose of this centre was to plan and carry out research about new sources of energy and ways of increasing environmental sustainability on the east coast of Canada. In October of 2020, the Centre incorporated as a non-profit and separated from the university.

In 2012, the new Shannon School of Business building opened and became the new home of the Shannon School of Business faculty and programs.

The university built a three-turbine, 5.4-megawatt wind farm off campus, at a cost of $17.6 million in partnership with Natural Forces Technologies, with the aim of producing enough electricity to offset its carbon dioxide emissions. The project took advantage of a government program which paid a premium rate per kilowatt for energy from small-scale green energy facilities. The farm is expected to generate approximately $2.1 million in annual revenue.

Nova Scotia Premier Tim Houston announced that a medical school will be established at CBU, in conjunction with Dalhousie University, opening no later than fall 2025.

== Academics ==
University rankings

World rankings

Canadian rankings
- Maclean's Undergraduate: 19
- Maclean's Reputation: 46

=== Enrolment ===
Cape Breton University currently has about 3,600 full-time and part-time students, of which roughly one half are international. Since 2017, a focus on international enrolment at CBU has more than doubled enrolment, with the number of students increasing by over 1,000 per year in 2018, 2019, and 2022. Public criticism of CBU's foreign enrolment policies came after the death of a CBU student in a house fire. In 2026, total enrolment at CBU decreased by 25% compared to the previous year.

=== Rankings ===
Cape Breton University has ranked 20th in the MacLean's primarily undergraduate university rankings for 2024, and 47th in their 2024 reputational survey. The university ranked 17th out of 20 in the 2024 in the Reputational Survey for primarily undergraduate universities.

=== Membership and Accreditation ===
Cape Breton University is a regular institutional member of the Association of Atlantic Universities (AAU), Universities Canada (UC), Colleges and Institutes Canada (CICan), and the Canadian Bureau for International Education (CBIE).

Both elementary and secondary streams of the Bachelor of Education are recognized by the Nova Scotia Office of Teacher Certification. All four tracks of the Nursing program are accredited by the Canadian Association of Schools of Nursing (CASN). Two Engineering programs are accredited by the Canadian Council of Technicians and Technologists (CCTT). The Bachelor of Health Sciences, Public Health (BHSc) is accredited by the Board of Certification of the Canadian Institute of Public Health Inspectors.

Cape Breton University is an active member of the University of the Arctic. UArctic is an international cooperative network based in the Circumpolar Arctic region, consisting of more than 200 universities, colleges, and other organizations with an interest in promoting education and research in the Arctic region.

=== Academic structure ===
Virtually all Cape Breton University degree, diploma and certificate programs offer a transition-to-work component through co-op education, work placements, internships and work-study programs. The university is composed of the following schools and affiliated colleges:

==== School of Arts and Social Sciences ====
Dean: Dr. Chris McDonald

The School of Arts and Social Sciences offers 15 Bachelor of Arts (BA) options, 12 Bachelor of Arts Community Studies (BACS) options, 1 diploma option, and 9 certificate options. It also includes a minor in Gaelic. Both the BA and BACS include an Honours option.

In 2016, the university began offering an interdisciplinary Bachelor of Arts and Science in Environment (BASE) degree. In 2023, the School began offering a post-baccalaureate Bachelor of Social Work.

==== School of Education and Health ====
Dean: Dr. Ellyn Lyle

The School of Education and Health (SEH) offers four Master of Education degrees (one of which is offered jointly with the Memorial University of Newfoundland) and a Bachelor of Education (BEd) degree along with two post-degree diplomas and one certificate. There is also a transfer Bachelor of Science (B.Sc.) degree in nutrition with the University of Prince Edward Island, Mount Saint Vincent University and St. Francis Xavier University. Additionally, the SEH offers a Bachelor of Health Sciences in Public Health. It has previously offered a Bachelor of Emergency Management.

==== School of Nursing ====
Dean: Dr. Karen Kennedy

The School of Nursing offers three Bachelor of Science Nursing (BSCN) options, a three-year program for students directly from high school, a two-year program for students who have university experience, and a program for Licensed Practical Nurses to become Registered Nurses (typically completed in 24 months).

==== Shannon School of Business ====
Dean: Dr. John Nadeau

The Shannon School of Business offers one Master of Business Administration with a focus on Community Economic Development (MBA CED) along with 9 Bachelor of Business Administration (BBA) degree options. There is also a Bachelor of Hospitality and Tourism Management. Four post-baccalaureate diplomas are also offered.

==== School of Science and Technology ====
Dean: Dr. Stephanie MacQuarrie

The School of Science and Technology offers four Bachelor of Science (BSc) degree options and five Bachelor of Engineering Technology (BET) degree options. The School also offers a Bachelor of Arts and Science in the Environment. Students may also pursue six Bachelor of Engineering (BEng) transfer degree options with Dalhousie University. Jointly with the Canadian Coast Guard College, a Bachelor of Technology in Nautical Science is available.

==== Unama'ki College ====
Associate Vice-President: Stephen Augustine

Dean: Laurianne Sylvester

In 2010, Unama'ki College was founded as an offshoot of the school specializing in Mi'kmaq history, culture and education. As of 2013, it has some 250 aboriginal students. Its library holds 1,500 books on aboriginal issues and 7,000 documents.

The college includes the following facilities:

- Mi'kmaq Resource Centre (MRC)
- L'nui'sultimkeweyo'kom Mi'kmaq Language Lab
- Indigenous Science Research Commons
- Indigenous Students Commons

The Department of Indigenous Studies offers disciplines in Mi'kmaq Studies and Integrative Science.

== Scholarships and bursaries ==
CBU offers nine major entrance scholarships based on the student's average from high school. Students with a 90% average or greater are eligible for scholarships ranging in amount from $10,000 (Orpha Thayer-Scott) to $24,000 (Chancellor's) over a four-year period. Other entrance scholarships ranging from $500 to $2,000 a year are also available.

Students taking a minimum of 24 credits are eligible for in-course scholarships the following year depending on their academic performance. Unlike in-course bursaries, which are also available, in-course scholarships do not require an application.

A new Work-Study Bursary Program is also available to provide students with financial need the opportunity for on-campus employment.

The Government of Canada sponsors an Aboriginal Bursaries Search Tool that lists over 680 scholarships, bursaries, and other incentives offered by governments, universities, and industry to support Aboriginal post-secondary participation. Cape Breton University scholarships for Aboriginal, First Nations and Métis students include: Earth Tech/CBCL Award – Entrance Award; Verschuren Family Entrance Scholarship; Wood, Walker Foundation Aboriginal Awards Entrance Scholarship; Bank of Montreal Aboriginal Business Administration Student Scholarship.

== Research ==
Associate Vice-President, Academic & Research: Dr. Tanya Brann-Barrett

CBU is a small comprehensive university that performs over $3 million in externally funded research and employed over 65 students as researchers in 2011. The Office of Research and Graduate Studies publishes two annual research publication titled Research Matters, as well as a separate student Research Matters magazine. Research chairs at CBU include:

- Tier 1 & Tier 2 Canada Research Chairs
  - Healthy Environments and Communities (Dr. Xu Zhang, Tier 2)
  - Musical Traditions (Dr. Heather Sparling, Tier 2)
  - Social Enterprise in Inclusive Markets (Dr. Kevin McKague, Tier 2)
  - Post-Industrial Communities (Dr. Lachlan MacKinnon, Tier 2)
  - Sport Coaching and Adult Learning (Dr. Bettina Callary, Tier 2)
- Viola Desmond Chairs
  - Social Justice (Dr. Graham Reynolds)
- Purdy Crawford Chairs
  - Aboriginal Business Studies (Dr. Mary Beth Doucette)
- University Research Chair
  - Marine Ecosystem Research (Dr. Bruce Hatcher)
- Former Tier 1 & Tier 2 Canada Research Chairs
  - Integrative Science (Dr. Cheryl Bartlett, Tier 1)
  - Intangible Cultural Heritage (Dr. Richard MacKinnon, Tier 1)
  - Molecular Spectroscopy (Dr. Dale Keefe, Tier 2)
  - Determinants of Healthy Communities (Dr. Ashlee Cunsolo Willox, Tier 2)
  - Communities and Culture (Dr. Marcia Ostashewski, Tier 2)
- Former Industrial Research Chairs
  - Green Mining (Dr. Alicia Oickle)
  - Mine Water Management (Dr. habil. Christian Wolkersdorfer)
  - Environmental Remediation (Dr. Ken Oakes)
  - Mine Water Management (Dr. Martin Mkandawire)
- Former Purdy Crawford Chairs
  - Aboriginal Business Studies (Dr. Keith Brown, Dr. Janice Esther Tulk)

Additionally, Dr. Bruce Hatcher is the Director of the Bras D'Or Institute.

Projects are funded by all federal granting councils (CFI, NSRIT, NSERC, SSHRC, CIHR, AIF projects).

The President's Award for Excellence in Research is an annual award which recognizes members of the CBU Faculty who demonstrate excellence in research and scholarship. From 2012, the winners have been:

- 2012: Dr. Richard MacKinnon, Professor of Folklore
- 2013: Dr. Katherine Covell, Professor of Psychology
- 2014: Dr. David Mullan, Professor of History
- 2015: Dr. Peter MacIntyre, Professor of Psychology
- 2016: Dr. Adango Miadonye, Professor of Chemistry
- 2017: Dr. Edward Barre, Professor of Nutrition
- 2018: Dr. Stewart McCann, Professor of Psychology

== Students' union ==
The Cape Breton University Students' Union provides services such as the Emergency Bursary Fund, funding and management of societies, health and dental plans, Food Bank, Women's Centre, Pride and Ally Centre, Multicultural Hub, Capers Helping Capers, The Orange Initiative, Caper Convenience (store), and free legal service. The CBUSU's main focus is advocacy on behalf of its members, and it is also the largest employer of students on the CBU campus.

=== Student Representative Council ===
The SRC acts as the board of directors for the Union. It is a body of students elected to represent the various demographics of CBU, including the different schools within it. They meet on a regular basis to vote on motions put before the SRC by representatives or CBU students.

The current Executive includes:

- President & CEO: Harsimran Kaur Antaal
- Executive Vice-president: Rebecca Seymour
- Vice-president Finance & Operations: Simran Sharma
- Vice-president Promotions: Angelica Bermudez Hereara
- Vice President Student Service: Destiny Dawn Tobin

=== Clubs and societies ===
The CBU Students' Union has had over 60 societies since 2003.

== Newspaper ==
The Caper Times is a newspaper owned collectively by the students of Cape Breton University and published by the Publishing Board of the Caper Times. The newspaper has been autonomous from the Cape Breton University Students' Union since March 1, 2013. It is a member of the Canadian University Press. The newspaper publishes as an electronic monthly newsletter, which is tailored specifically for Cape Breton University students and faculty.

== Athletics ==
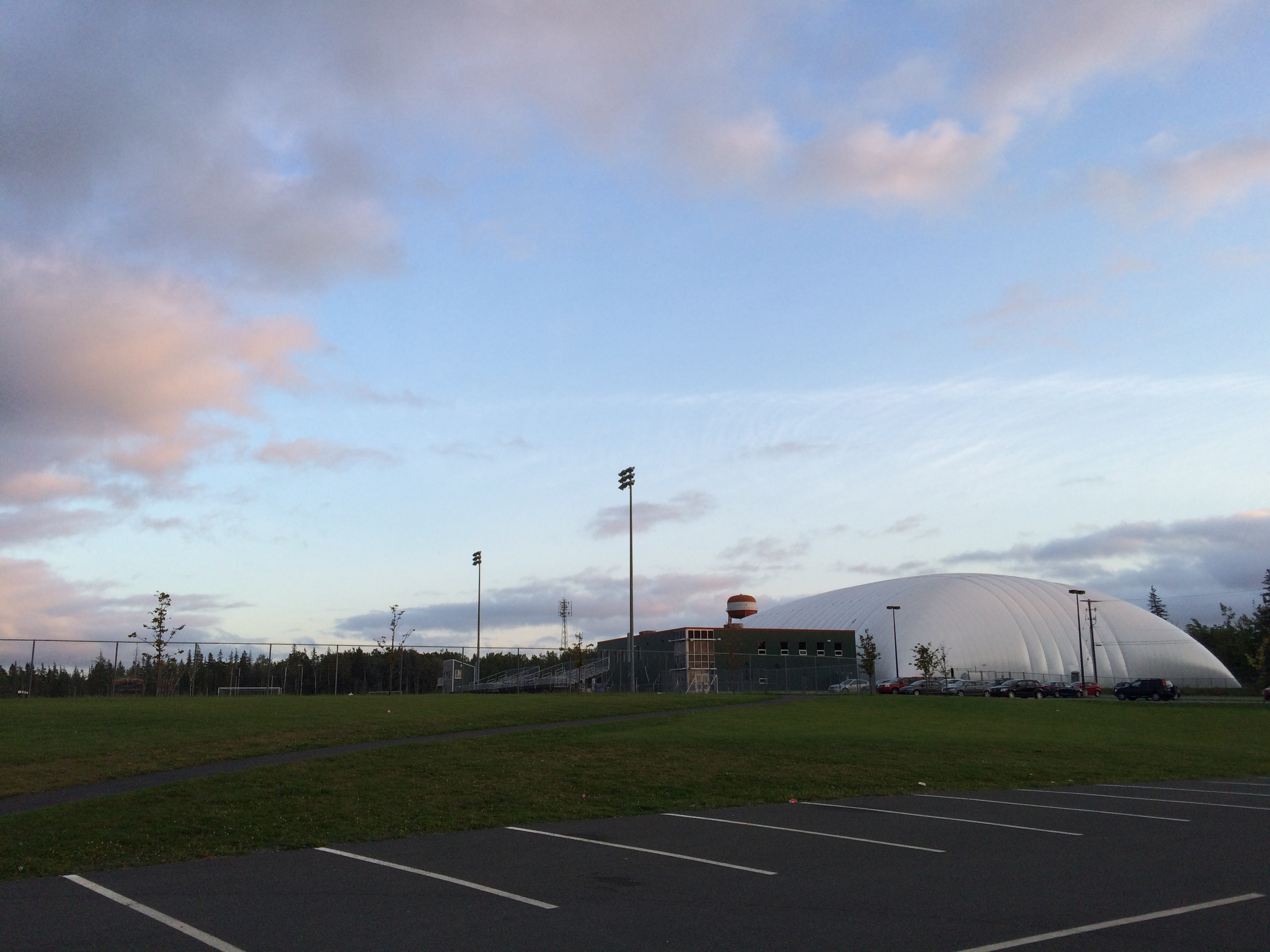
The dome is host to an indoor soccer field. The outdoor field also features a soccer field, along with a track. The building is home to CBU's on-campus gym.

CBU is represented in the Atlantic University Sport (AUS) association by the CBU Capers. The Capers' varsity program includes four teams: men's and women's soccer and basketball teams. All sports teams wear uniforms with the Caper logo and mascot along with the school colour (orange).

== Notable alumni ==
=== Entertainment ===
- Steve Arbuckle, actor
- Richie Wilcox, singer, actor, theatre director, contestant on Canadian Idol

=== Arts and humanities ===
- Ursula Johnson, multidisciplinary Mi'kmaq artist
- Neil Libbey, author and historian

=== Politics and public service ===
- Nolan Crouse, former mayor of St. Albert, Alberta
- David Dingwall, former Liberal politician, President of Cape Breton University
- Ray Ivany, executive, former President of Nova Scotia Community College and Acadia University
- Manning MacDonald, former Nova Scotia Liberal MLA Cape Breton South
- Derek Mombourquette, Nova Scotia Liberal MLA Sydney-Whitney Pier
- John W. Morgan, former mayor of Cape Breton Regional Municipality
- Gerald Sampson, former Nova Scotia Liberal MLA Victoria-The Lakes

=== Sports ===
- Amanda Budden, professional footballer
- Pamela LeJean, former para-athlete
- Meshack Lufile, basketball player
- Jason Massie, soccer player in League1 Ontario
- Boitumelo Rabale, professional footballer
- Peter Schaale, professional footballer, centre-back for HFX Wanderers

== See also ==
- Higher education in Nova Scotia
- List of universities in Nova Scotia
- Canadian Interuniversity Sport
- Canadian government scientific research organizations
- Canadian university scientific research organizations
