= Eskasoni First Nation =

First Nation in Canada

Eskasoni Mi'kmaw Nation
- Band No. 23
- Eskisoqnikewey L'nue'kati
- People: Miꞌkmaq
- Province: Nova Scotia

Land
- Main reserve: Eskasoni 3
- Reserves: Eskasoni 3A; Malagawatch 4
- Land area: 42.809 km^{2} (16.529 sq mi)

Population (2021)
- On reserve: 3973
- Off reserve: 700
- Total population: 4673

Government
- Chief: Leroy Denny
- Council size: 12

Tribal Council
- Union of Nova Scotia Miꞌkmaq

Website
- eskasoni.ca

The Eskasoni Mi'kmaw Nation (Mi'kmaq: Esg'soqonig, Eskissonqnik or We'gwistoqonig) is a band government of the Mi'kmaq First Nations, located in Unama'ki (Cape Breton), Nova Scotia, Canada. As of 2021, Eskasoni has a membership of 4,675. Of this population, 3,973 live on-Reserve, and 667 live off-Reserve.

== History ==
On-reserve populations
Year	Pop.	±%
1871	125	—
1891	80	−36.0%
1900	140	+75.0%
1941	200	+42.9%
1991	2,206	+1003.0%
2001	2,741	+24.3%
2023	5,064	+84.8%
Source: Statistics Canada,

The word 'Eskasoni' is derived from the Mi'kmaq word We'kwistoqnik, which means 'where the fir trees are plentiful'.

In 1942, the federal government enacted a centralization policy through Indian Affairs. This policy led to the forced relocation of hundreds of Mi’kmaq from the Digby, Nova Scotia area to two reserves – Eskasoni and Shubenacadie, known today as Sipekne’katik. This led to rapid population growth in Eskasoni, which was previously home to less than 200 residents.

In 2016 Dr. Mohan Singh Virick, a Sikh doctor who served Eskasoni for 50 years, donated 140 hectares (335 acres) of land. He also donated a building in Sydney to help house Eskasoni's growing population.

== Present day ==
Eskasoni is the most populous community of the Mi'kmaq Nation. It has its own community radio station, CICU-FM, broadcasting at 94.1 MHz. The Eskasoni First Nation is also home of the Unama'ki Institute of Natural Resources, a Mi'kmaq organization devoted to natural resources and the environment.

The community operates its own school board, providing services to children from kindergarten to grade 12.

The Eskasoni First Nation is composed of three parts:

Community	Area	Location	Population	Date established
Eskasoni 3	3,504.6 hectares (8,660 acres)	40 km. southwest of Sydney	3,973	July 1, 1832
Eskasoni 3A	28.5 hectares (70 acres)	40 km. southwest of Sydney	0	July 20, 1948
Malagawatch 4 (1/5 share)	661.3 hectares (1,634 acres)	62 km. southwest of Sydney	0	August 2, 1833
