= Kejimkujik =

Kejimkujik or Kejimikujik may refer to:

- Kejimkujik National Park, a national park of Canada in Nova Scotia
- Kejimikujik Lake, a lake in Nova Scotia
- 497593 Kejimkujik, a main-belt minor planet
