= Medway Community Forest =

Medway Community Forest Coop Ltd. is a community forest pilot project in southwestern Nova Scotia. Covering 15,000 hectares of land, it is the first community-owned forest on crown land in Canada east of Quebec.

It borders the Kejimkujik National Park and the Tobeatic Wilderness Area.

== History ==
The provincial government bought private lands in southwestern Nova Scotia belonging to Resolute Forest Products in 2012. At the same time, community forestry in Nova Scotia quickly picked up steam after a discussion paper was published by Dalhousie University. In 2013, the government launched two calls for proposals of a community project pilot and Medway Community Forest was accepted. After some negotiations, the agreement was signed in January 2015.

The community forest commissioned a report in 2017 for the establishment of a carbon offset program in a cap and trade system
