= Paine House =

Paine House may refer to the following places:

- Paine House (Coventry, Rhode Island), listed on the National Register of Historic Places
- Paine House (Xenia, Illinois), listed on the National Register of Historic Places
- Samuel and Mercy Paine House, listed on the National Register of Historic Places
- Paine House (Irving, Texas), listed on the National Register of Historic Places in Dallas County, Texas
- Paine-Dodge House, listed on the National Register of Historic Places, located on Greenwood Farm (Ipswich, Massachusetts)
