= Mersey Tobeatic Research Institute =

Research institution in Canada

The Mersey Tobeatic Research Institute is a non-profit, cooperative research institute that operates a field station located in Queens County, Nova Scotia, between the communities of Kempt and Caledonia, Nova Scotia. It was established in 2004 and has recently undertaken an expansion project. The institute focuses on open research that is shared with the public and focuses on sustainable resource use within the UNESCO designated Southwest Nova Biosphere Reserve.
