= Mersey River (Nova Scotia) =

River in Canada

Mersey
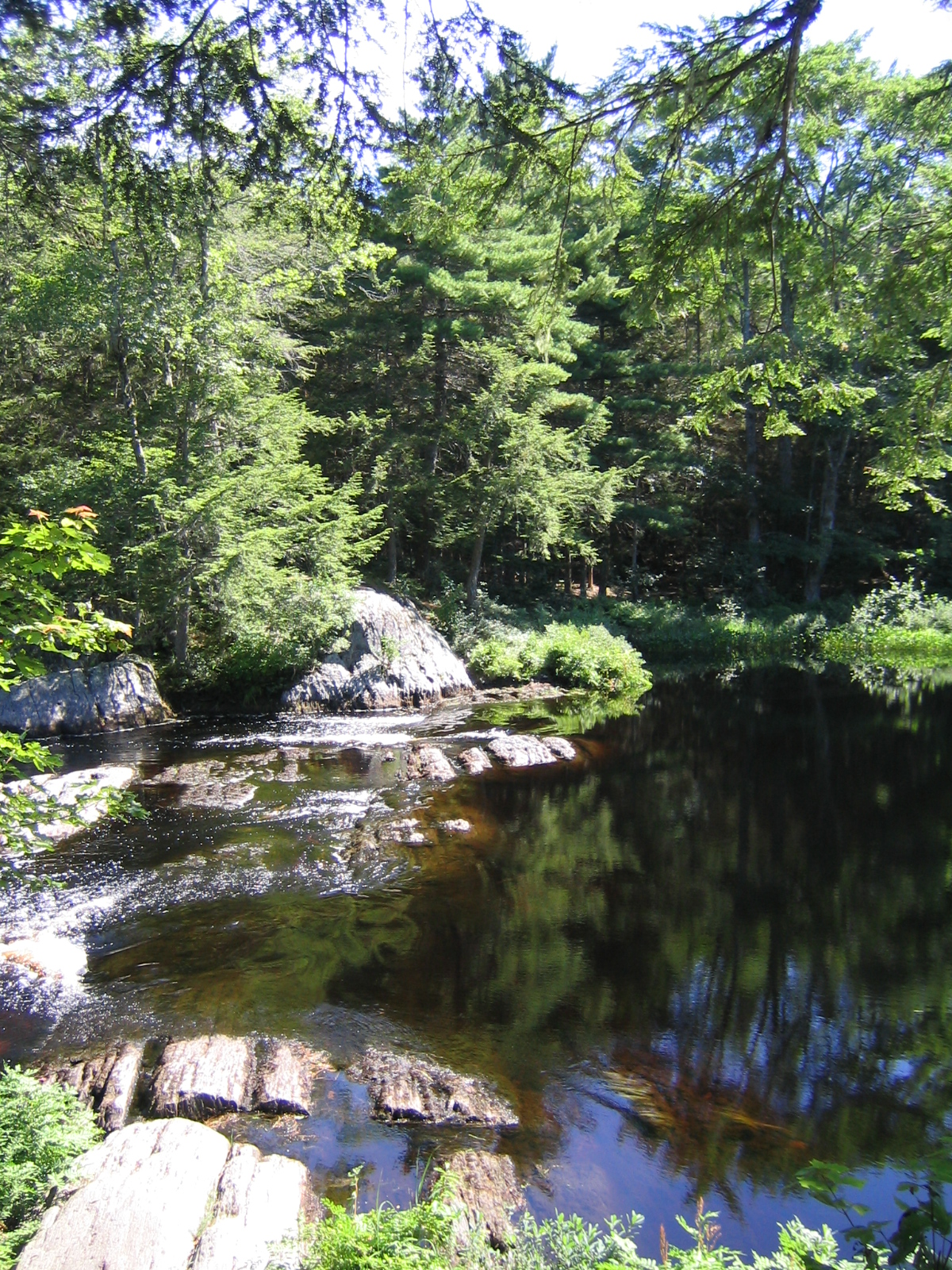
- The Mersey River in Kejimkujik National Park.

- Location of mouth

Location
- Country: Canada
- Province: Nova Scotia

Physical characteristics
- Source
  - location: Eleven Mile Lake (Annapolis County)
- Mouth: Atlantic Ocean
  - coordinates: 44°2′59.1″N 64°44′20.8″W
  - elevation: sea level
- Length: 146 km (91 mi)
- Basin size: 3,030 km^{2} (1,170 sq mi)

The Mersey River, formerly known as Rivière Rossignol by the Acadians, is a river in Nova Scotia, Canada. It is named after the River Mersey in Liverpool, England. The river proper flows from the eastern end of Eleven Mile Lake in Annapolis County southward to Kejimkujik Lake in Kejimkujik National Park, then through Lake Rossignol to empty into the Atlantic Ocean at the town of Liverpool, Nova Scotia. The true source of the river however is as far northwest as Sandy Bottom Lake (Annapolis County) or Tuskopeake Brook (Annapolis County) on the northern tributary.

The river was a major transportation route for the Mi'kmaq people of Nova Scotia. Later, it was used to transport logs out of the interior of the province. The river was described in Albert Bigelow Paine's The Tent Dwellers, albeit under the name 'Liverpool river'. There are a number of hydroelectric projects on the river, which has been exploited for more than a hundred years.

Much of the headwater area is composed of fen. It is a popular river for novice canoeists. Smallmouth bass has been found in the Mersey and neighbouring watersheds.

== See also ==
- List of rivers of Nova Scotia
