= Kejimikujik Lake =

Lake in Nova Scotia, Canada

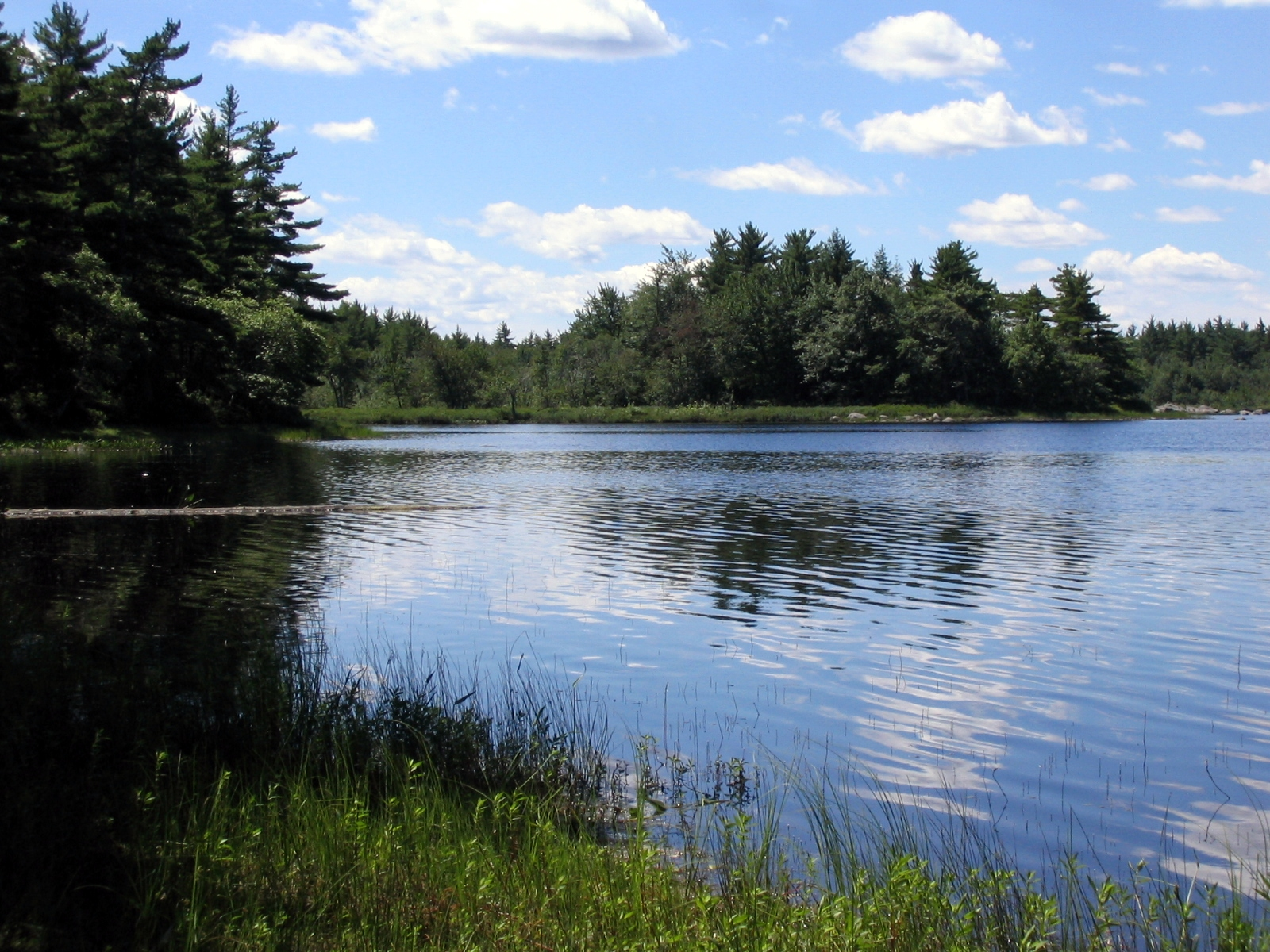

- Location within Nova Scotia
- Location: Annapolis County / Queens County, Nova Scotia
- Coordinates: 44°22′13″N 65°13′49″W
- Basin countries: Canada
- Surface elevation: 88 m (289 ft)

Kejimikujik Lake (often referred to simply as Kejimkujik, or less commonly as Kedgeemakoogee) is a large freshwater lake in the interior of the southwestern end of the Nova Scotian peninsula. Kejimkujik Lake is the namesake of and largest lake in Kejimkujik National Park. It is the second largest freshwater lake in Nova Scotia after Lake Rossignol, spanning an area of 26 kilometers squared. Kejimkujik Lake is encompassed by 45 kilometers of shoreline, virtually all of which exists in an undeveloped natural state, and reaches a maximum depth exceeding 19 meters.

The word "Kejimkujik" is derived from the Mi'kmaq language, but interpretation of its meaning varies depending on the source. Many people familiar with the language interpret the name to mean "attempting to escape" or "swollen waters". Parks Canada's official stance is that Kejimkujik is a Mi'kmaq word meaning "little fairies". Prior to the establishment of the area as a national park in the late 1960's, the lake was known as Fairy Lake. Today, Fairy Bay on the northeastern shore of Kejimkujik continues to bear this name.

Kejimkujik Lake and the surrounding wilderness have long served as a popular tourist destination, with several wilderness lodges and outfitters built around the northeastern shore of the lake. The primary purpose of these businesses was to support the booming sport fishing and game hunting industries supported by the lake and surrounding forests during the late 19th and early 20th centuries. Kejimkujik Lake was featured in The Tent Dwellers by Albert Bigelow Paine, a book chronicling his fishing trip through the central Nova Scotian wildness during the region's sporting era (the early 1900s). Today, the lake continues to draw tourists to the national park for its camping, canoeing, and angling opportunities, and for its picturesque lakeshore beaches.

According to Mi'kmaq legend, the depths of Kejimkujik Lake are home to a great horned serpent. Centuries-old Mi'kmaq petroglyphs on the lake's shoreline illustrate a depiction of this creature.
