= Shelburne River =

River in Nova Scotia, Canada

Coordinates: 44°12′34.6″N 65°13′7.8″W

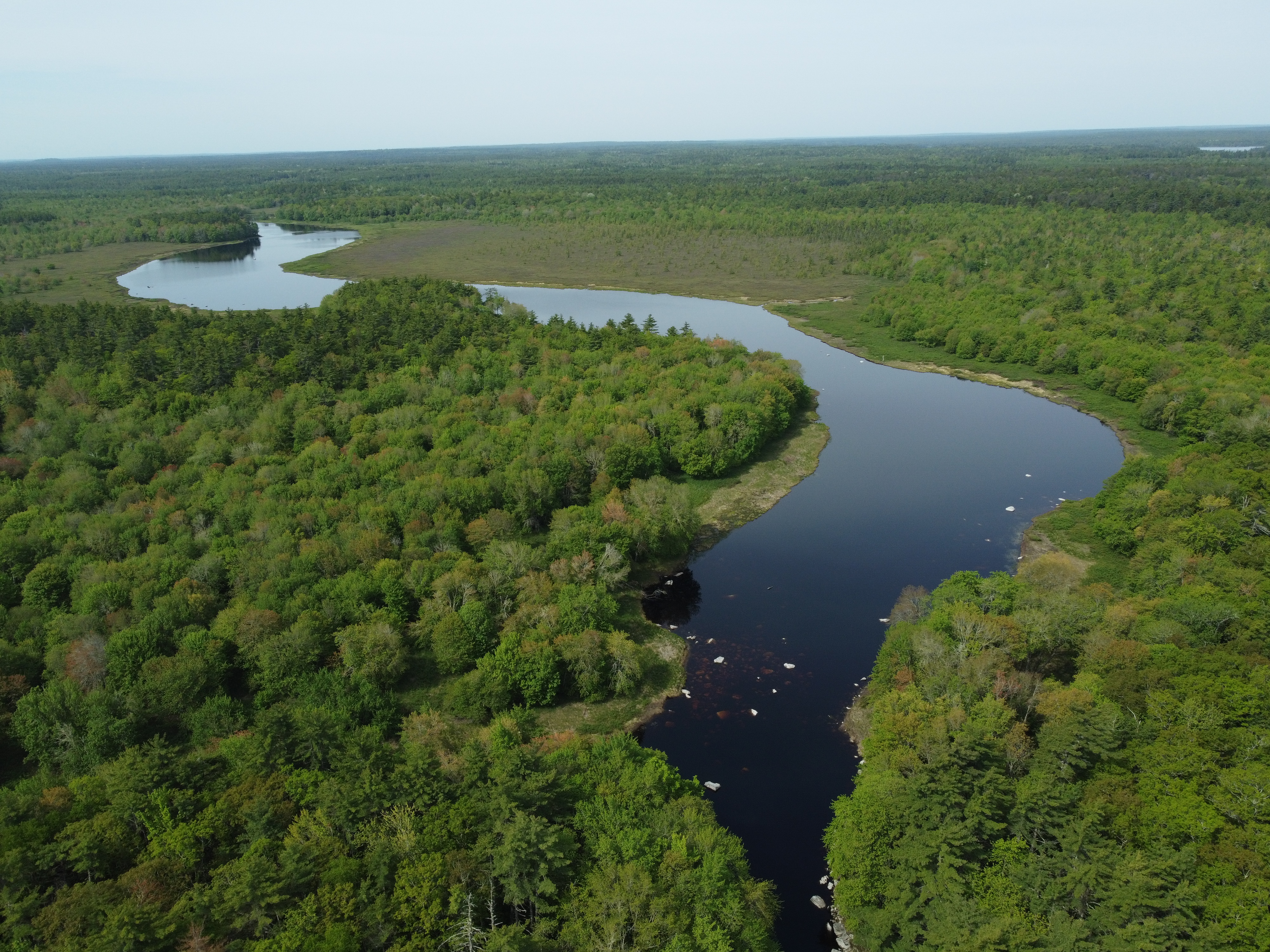
- The lower reaches of the Shelburne River before it reaches Lake Rossignol.

- Location of mouth

Location
- Country: Canada
- Province: Nova Scotia

Physical characteristics
- Mouth
  - location: Lake Rossignol
- Length: 53 km (33 mi)
- Basin size: 277.39 km^{2} (107.10 sq mi)

The Shelburne River is a 53 km long river in Nova Scotia, Canada. It is a wilderness river and is a tributary of Mersey River. It starts in the Tobeatic Wilderness Area.

The Shelburne River was designated a Canadian Heritage River in 1997.

== See also ==
- List of rivers of Nova Scotia
