= Southwest Nova Biosphere Reserve =

UNESCO Biosphere Reserve in Nova Scotia, Canada

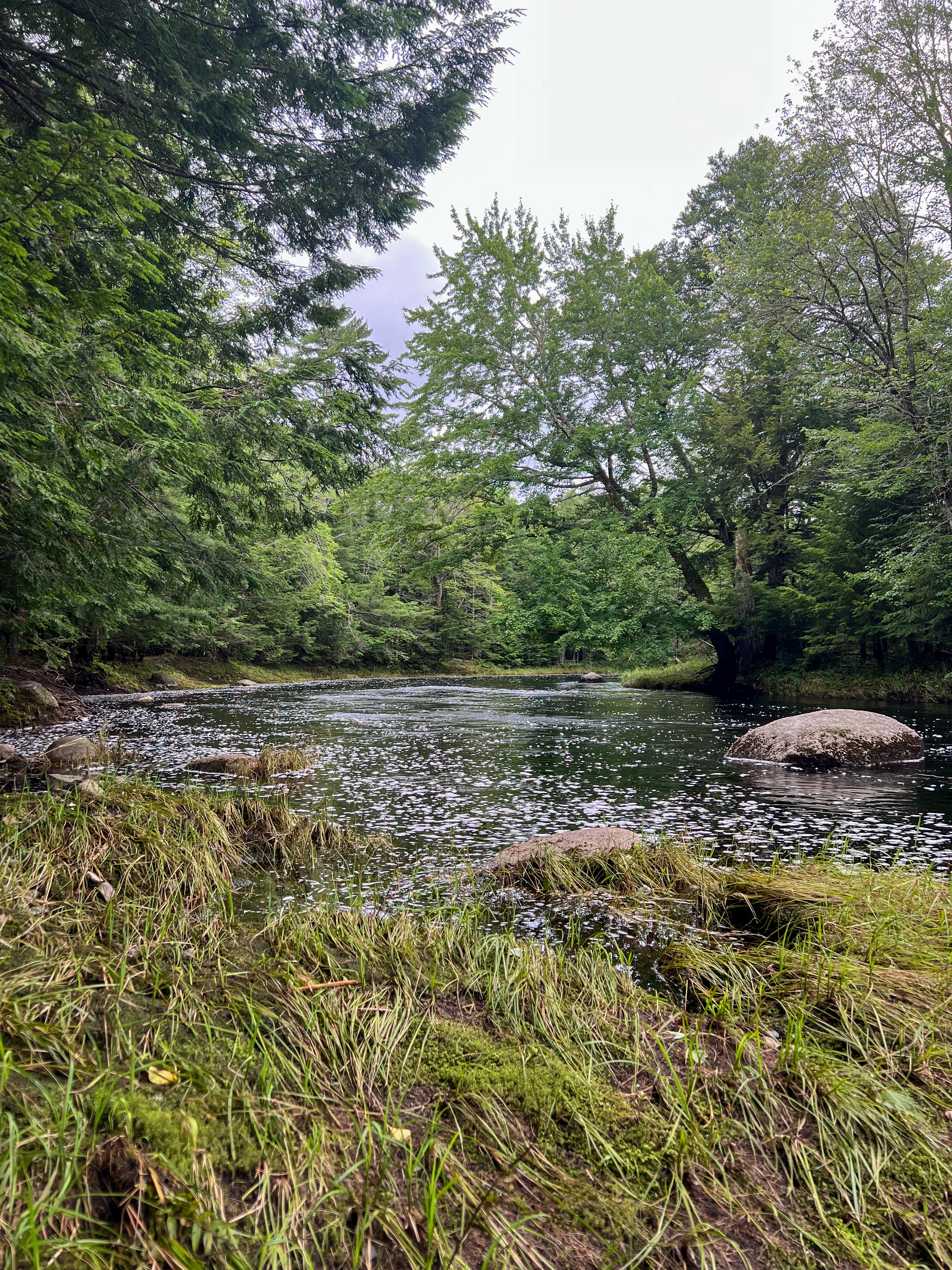
- The Mersey River and woodland characteristic of the Wabanaki Forest in Kejimkujik National Park.

- Location within Nova Scotia
- Location: Nova Scotia, Canada
- Coordinates: 44°13′N 65°50′W
- Area: 1,546,374 ha (5,970.58 sq mi)
- Designation: UNESCO Biosphere Reserve
- Established: 2001
- Governing body: Southwest Nova Biosphere Reserve Association

The Southwest Nova Biosphere Reserve was designated in 2001 under the UNESCO Man and the Biosphere Programme. The Southwest Nova Biosphere Reserve is the largest UNESCO biosphere reserve in Canada, spanning over 1.54 million hectares across five Nova Scotian counties: Annapolis, Digby, Queens, Shelburne and Yarmouth. The core protected areas of the biosphere reserve are Kejimkujik National Park and the Tobeatic Wilderness Area.

The Southwest Nova Biosphere Region is considered to be a biodiversity hotspot, hosting some of the richest biodiversity in Eastern Canada. In total, 75% of all species at risk in Nova Scotia can be found within the biosphere region. Southwestern Nova Scotia is home to an abnormally high number of disjunct plant, animal, and lichen populations. Many of these populations represent the only known occurrence of their species in the Maritimes (as is the case with Blanding's turtle, northern ribbon snake, and Virginia meadow beauty, among others), or in Canada generally (including but not limited to water pennywort, dwarf chain fern, thread-leaved sundew, and perforated ruffle lichen).

== See also ==
- Biosphere Reserves of Canada
