= Hollow Tree Nights and Days =

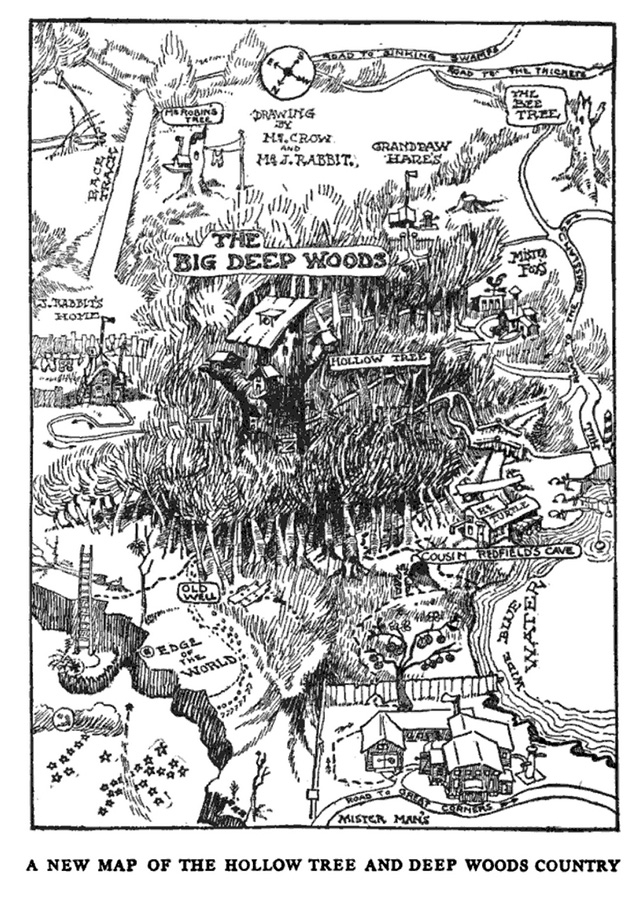
J. M. Condé's map of "Big Deep Woods" in Albert Bigelow Paine's Hollow Tree Nights and Days, 1915.

Hollow Tree Nights and Days is a children's book written by Albert Bigelow Paine and illustrated by J. M. Condé. It was published by Harper & Brothers in 1915. The book continues the tales of the 'Coon, the 'Possum, the Old Black Crow, and their friends.

The general setting of this book is 'the story teller' who sits in a rocking chair in front of the old fireplace, with the 'Little Lady' sitting on his lap as he smokes a pipe and tells the old stories of the Hollow Tree Folk.

The book contain pen-and-ink illustrations of the stories, including a new map of the Hollow Tree and Deep Woods Country.

== The Hollow Tree Series ==
- The Hollow Tree and Deep Woods Book (1901)
- The Hollow Tree Snowed-In Book (1910)
- Hollow Tree Nights and Days (1915)
