= Paine House (Xenia, Illinois) =

Historic house in Illinois, United States

- U.S. National Register of Historic Places
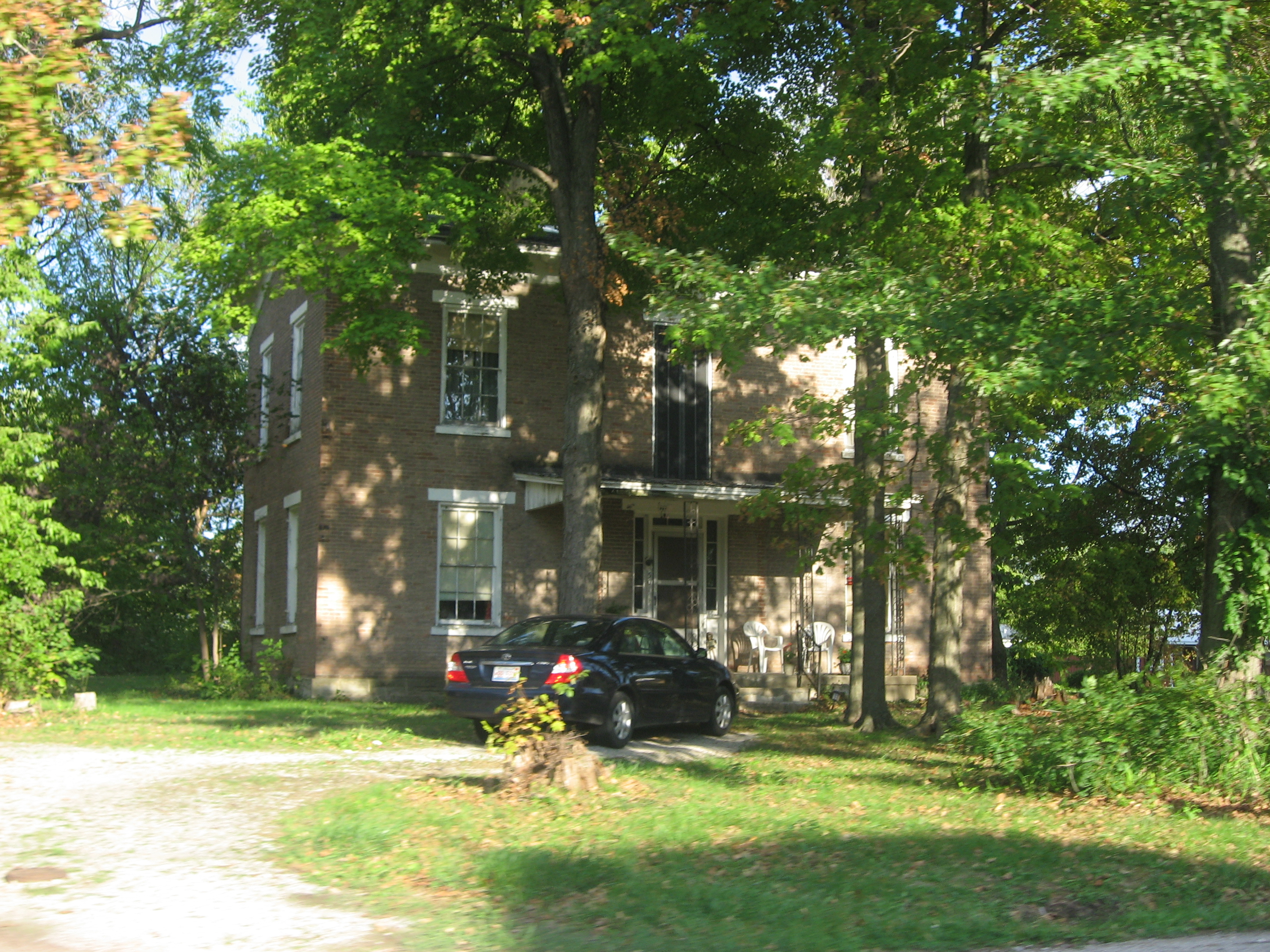

- Location within Illinois Location within the United States
- Location: Rt. 1, Box 19 A, Xenia, Illinois
- Coordinates: 38°38′19″N 88°38′5″W
- Area: less than one acre
- Built: 1858
- Built by: McGiffen, John
- Architectural style: Greek Revival, Gothic Revival
- NRHP reference No.: 85002843
- Added to NRHP: November 14, 1985

The Paine House is a historic house in Xenia, Illinois, which was the home of author Albert Bigelow Paine. Built in 1858, the house was designed using elements of the Greek Revival and Gothic Revival styles. Paine lived there from 1873 to 1888, during which he began his writing career, authoring numerous stories and poems. Several of his works appeared in Xenia's newspapers, inspiring his pursuit of a literary career. Paine later became known for his friendship with Mark Twain; he edited Twain's letters and wrote a multi-volume biography of the author. As of the 1980s, the house was still owned by Paine's descendants.

The house was added to the National Register of Historic Places on November 14, 1985.
