= J. M. Condé =

American cartoonist

J. M. Condé was an early 20th century "golden age" book illustrator and comic strip artist best known for his ink and watercolor illustrations for books by Joel Chandler Harris and Albert Bigelow Paine. He also worked on at least two comic strips, one of which was derived from Harris's "Br'er Rabbit" stories.

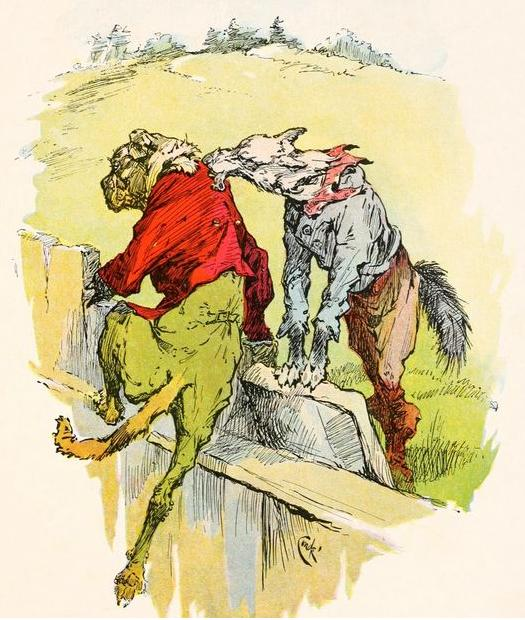
Illustration of Aesop's fable "The Dog and the Wolf", 1905

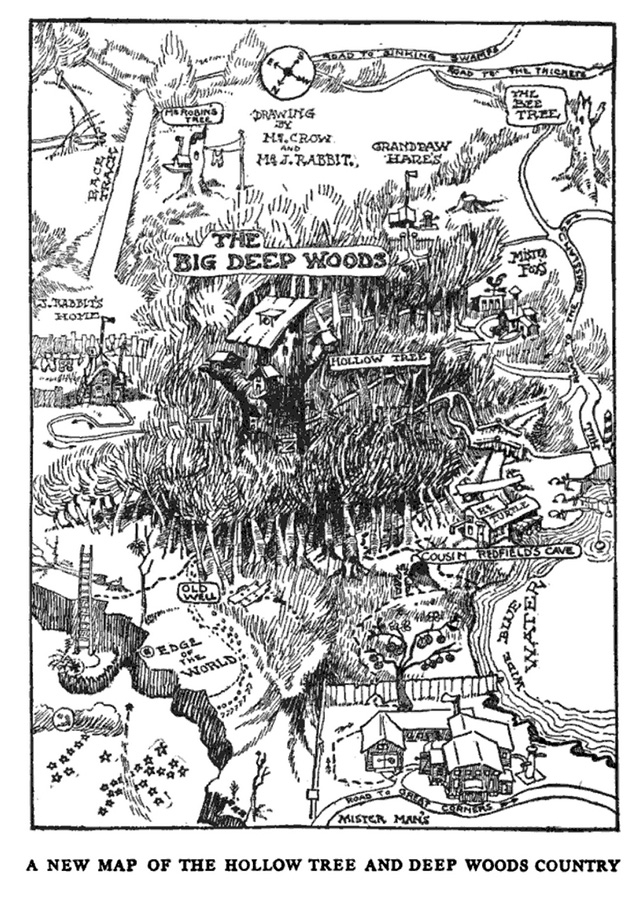
Map of "Big Deep Woods" in Albert Bigelow Paine, Hollow Tree Nights and Days, 1915

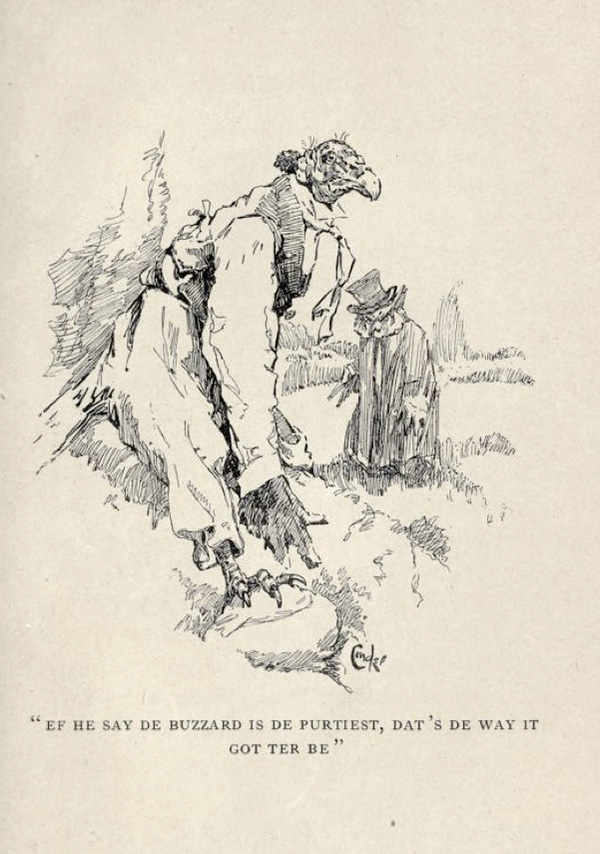
Illustration for "The Most Beautiful Bird" in Joel Chandler Harris, Uncle Remus Returns, 1918

== Career ==
Condé worked in what is known as the golden age of American illustration in the early 20th century. His energetic line work calls to mind the work of his contemporary A. B. Frost, while his use of vivid color evokes Winsor McKay. He specialized in illustrations of animals in books for children.

Condé illustrated the "Hollow Tree" books of Albert Bigelow Paine and some of Joel Chandler Harris's "Uncle Remus" stories, as well as books by Martha Strudwick Young and Aesop's Fables. Like some other illustrators of the day, Condé attempted to show animals as if drawn from life, though he also followed the 'humanizing' line of traditional animal fables and usually clothed his animal characters in trousers and coat or shirt, and sometimes shoes as well.

From June to October 1906, the McClure Syndicate ran a Sunday color comic strip entitled Brer Rabbit (sometimes referred to as Uncle Remus Stories), based on Harris's stories and drawn by Condé. There were 16 episodes in the series, each with its own title, such as "Brer Rabbit & the Gold Mine."

Another comic strip from Condé was Aubrey of the Tenements (1904), which featured a cat named Aubrey and his nameless friend, a talkative and rude parrot who gets them both into all kinds of mischief after they move from the slums to an upper-class home.

== Selected books illustrated ==
(Alphabetical by author)

Aesop (translation by George F. Townsend)

- Aesop's Fables (1905), some in color

Raymond Fuller Ayers

- Animal Folk (ca. 1901)

S. Ten Eyck Bourke

- Fables in Feathers (c. 1907)

C. F. Carter

- Katooticut (1899)

John Walker Harrington

- The jumping kangaroo and the apple butter cat (1900)

Joel Chandler Harris

- Told by Uncle Remus: New Stories of the Old Plantation (1905), illus. by A. B. Frost, Condé, and Frank Ver Beck
- Uncle Remus and the Little Boy (1910)
- Uncle Remus Returns (1918)

Albert Bigelow Paine

- The Hollow Tree and Deep Woods Book (1898)
- Making Up with Mr. Dog: Hollow Tree Stories (1901)
- How Mr. Rabbit Lost His Tail: Hollow Tree Stories (1910)
- The Hollow Tree Snowed-In Book (1910)
- Hollow Tree Nights and Days (1915)
- Mr. Rabbit's Wedding: Hollow Tree Stories (1917)
- Mr. Crow and the Whitewash: Hollow Tree Stories (1917)
- Mr. Turtle's Flying Adventure: Hollow Tree Stories (1917)

Martha Strudwick Young

- Plantation Bird Legends (1902)
- Beyond the Dark Pines (1912)
