= The Hollow Tree and Deep Woods Book =

Children's book by Albert Bigelow Paine

The Hollow Tree and Deep Woods Book is a children's book of short stories by Albert Bigelow Paine. It was published first in 1898 as an edition in one volume of The Hollow Tree and In the Deep Woods with several new stories and pictures added.

The book has 28 animal stories, notably tales of the 'Coon, the 'Possum, and the Old Black Crow, which live in the Hollow Tree in the Deep Woods.

These books contain pen-and-ink illustrations by J. M. Condé.

== The Hollow Tree Series ==
- The Hollow Tree and Deep Woods Book (1898)
- The Hollow Tree Snowed-In Book (1910)
- Hollow Tree Nights and Days (1915)
