= Kejimkujik National Park =

National park in Nova Scotia, Canada

- Parc national Kejimkujik
- IUCN category II (national park)
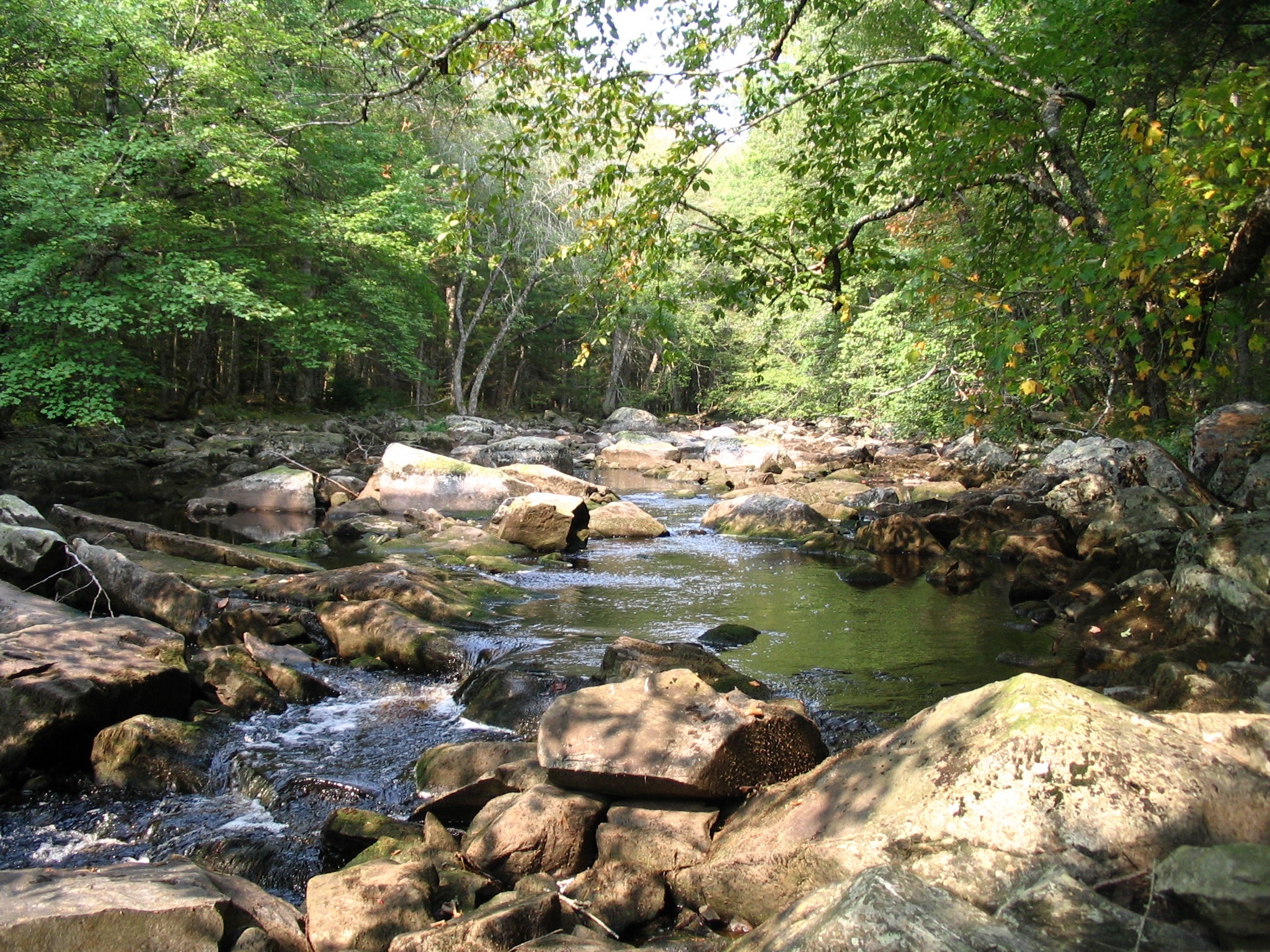
- Little River

- Location within Canada Location within Nova Scotia
- Interactive map of Kejimkujik National Park
- Location: Nova Scotia, Canada
- Nearest city: Halifax
- Coordinates: 44°23′57″N 65°13′06″W
- Area: 404 km^{2} (156 sq mi)
- Established: 1967
- Visitors: 75,284 (in 2022–23)
- Governing body: Parks Canada

National Historic Site of Canada
- Official name: Kejimkujik National Historic Site of Canada
- Designated: 1994

Kejimkujik National Park (/ˌkɛdʒɪməˈkuːdʒɪk/) is a national park of Canada, covering 404 km^{2} (156 sq mi) in the southwest of Nova Scotia peninsula. Located within three municipalities, Annapolis, Queens, and Digby, it consists of two separate land areas: a large inland portion, which is coincident with the Kejimkujik National Historic Site of Canada, and the Kejimkujik National Park Seaside on the province's Atlantic coast. Kejimkujik National Park and National Historic Site is located within, and (together with the adjoining Tobeatic Wilderness Area) comprises the core protected area component of the UNESCO Southwest Nova Biosphere Reserve, designated for its outstanding biodiversity value.

Kejimkujik is the only heritage site in Canada that has the dual designation as both a national park and a national historic site for the entirety of its landscape. Designated in 1994, the national historic site is a Mi'kmaq cultural landscape of forested upland plain located between Nova Scotia's South Shore and Annapolis Valley regions. It is home to several petroglyph sites, historical habitation sites, fishing, hunting and foraging territories, important historical travel routes (particularly canoe routes), and burial grounds dating back millennia.

The Royal Astronomical Society of Canada has designated the inland portion of the park a national dark-sky preserve, with some of the best night sky viewing conditions in southern Canada. Every summer, Kejimkujik hosts a "Dark Sky Weekend" with interpretive experiences highlighting the park's outstanding stargazing opportunities. Interpretive events during the weekend typically focus on astronomy and storytelling incorporating the constellations visible in the region's night sky during the summer. In 2022, the International Astronomical Union named a minor planet (497593 Kejimkujik) in honour of Kejimkujik National Park and National Historic Site and its dark sky preserve status.

The national park is named after Kejimikujik Lake. With a surface area of 26 square kilometres, Kejimkujik Lake is the largest lake in the park and the second largest freshwater lake in mainland Nova Scotia.

== History ==
The name Kejimkujik is officially translated to "tired muscles" in the Mi'kmaq language (possibly a reference to the physical effects of a long canoe trek through the area's waterways), although other sources interpret it to mean "swollen waters" or "attempting to escape". Some Mi'kmaw knowledge holders (and Parks Canada's official interpretation) state that the name derives from the Mi'kmaq word Kejimkuji’jk, which means "little fairies". Prior to the establishment of the area as a national park, Kejimkujik Lake was called Fairy Lake.

Canoe routes in the park have been used for thousands of years by the Mi'kmaq to travel from the Bay of Fundy to the Nova Scotia peninsula's Atlantic shore. A major travel route for the Mi'kmaq was the Mersey River, which drains areas deep in the peninsula's inland, including Kejimkujik Lake, to the Atlantic Ocean. Historically, the Mi'kmaq travelled up the Mersey River (inland) to the area around Kejimkujik Lake, where they lived and hunted during the fall and winter months. Historically, fall coincided with the inland migration of caribou, which inhabited the Canadian Maritimes until the early 20th century and provided an important food resource for the Mi'kmaq. Also important to the Mi'kmaq was the abundance of eels found in the area's waterways, with evidence of eel weirs constructed along the Mersey River possibly dating back thousands of years.

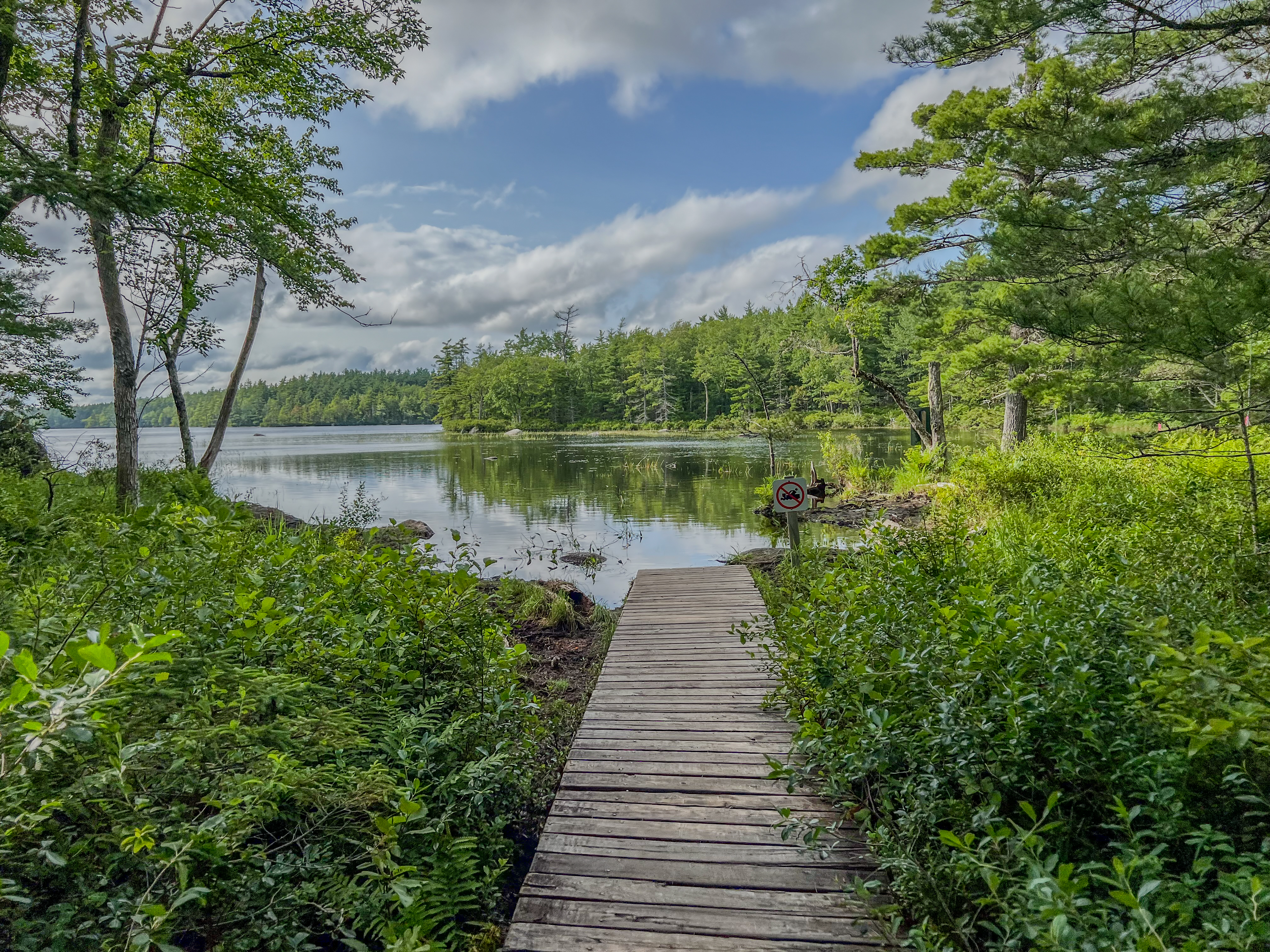
View of Big Dam Lake from Kejimkujik's portage Q. Many of the park's portage routes have been used for thousands of years.

There are several Mi'kmaw petroglyph sites in Kejimkujik, which contain around 500 individual glyphs. They are primarily found on slate beds on the eastern side of Kejimikujik Lake, but other sites are also known. Petroglyphs in the park receive a high level of protection because of their cultural and historical significance. Only one site can be visited by the public, and is only accessible via a guided tour with park staff during the summer months. Petroglyphs in Kejimkujik illustrate aspects of Mi'kmaw life shortly after European colonization of the area, and are dated to the 1700s and 1800s. Many glyphs are symbolic, and their subject sometimes ambiguous. Motifs associated with traditional culture including canoes, wigwams, traditional regalia, and decorative designs are common inclusions. Some glyphs illustrate aspects of the area's historical ecology through portrayals of animals that were formerly important to the Mi'kmaq as a food resource, like caribou. Caribou were driven to extirpation in the Maritime Provinces in the centuries following European settlement of the region, and have not occurred in the Kejimkujik area since around the late 19th century. While there are images of game animals, plants are notably absent. The petroglyphs also illustrate motifs associated with European colonial culture, like sailing ships, horses, women in dresses, Christian symbols, and five-pointed stars.

After European settlement, the Mi'kmaq living in the area found it increasingly difficult to maintain their traditional way of life. Many Mi'kmaq families were forced off of their hunting grounds by settlers who were clearing the land for farming and logging. Poverty eventually became pervasive for the area's Mi'kmaq residents. Ultimately, many of these residents either took up farming themselves or found employment as hunting and fishing guides for wealthy visitors to the area, who were drawn by the region's storied wilderness and wild game.

Today, the area does not serve as a residential area, but is still considered to be a spiritual home to the Mi'kmaq people. Opportunities for park visitors to learn about and experience Mi'kmaq culture and history are a primary component of Kejimkujik's interpretive programming, and include interpretive tours of one of the petroglyph sites, a recreated traditional Mi'kmaw encampment with an authentic wigwam, storytelling events, and an annual summer workshop demonstrating the art of Mi'kmaw birchbark canoe building by a renowned Mi'kmaw craftsman.

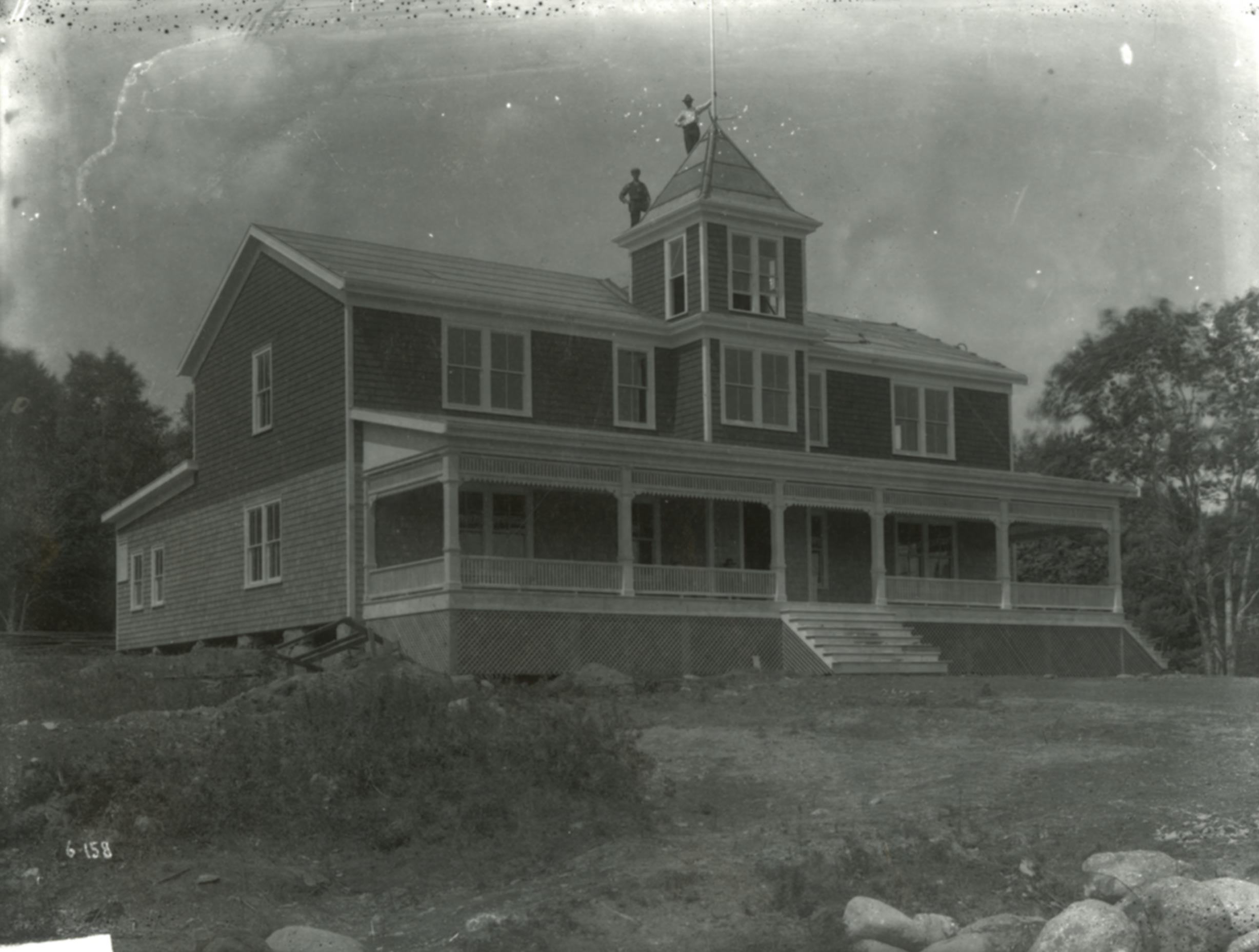
Kedgemakooge (Kedge) Lodge as it stood in 1910. Photo by Paul Yates.

During the late 19th and early 20th centuries, the area around Kejimkujik Lake was a popular tourist destination for sport fishing (primarily for brook trout) and hunting (primarily for moose). Most of the tourists visiting the area at this time came from elsewhere in Canada, the United Kingdom, and the United States. Much of the rural economy of inland southwestern Nova Scotia at that time was based on supporting this industry, with outfitting and guiding providing an important source of income for many of the region's inhabitants, especially during the summer and fall months. Many cabins and lodges were built around the eastern shores of Kejimkujik Lake to accommodate the sporting industry, the most famous and luxurious of which was the Kedge Rod and Gun Club (later known as Kedgemakooge (Kedge) Lodge), built in the late 1870's. Kedge Lodge and the other wilderness resorts in the area played a significant role in cementing Kejimkujik Lake's reputation as a vacation destination, hosting such notable guests as Babe Ruth and Zane Grey. While most of the historical cabins and lodges that existed in Kejimkujik are no longer standing, one of the original cabins near Peskawa Lake is maintained as a backcountry rental accommodation for park visitors.

In 1969, the Government of Canada designated the recreational and wilderness areas around Kejimkujik Lake as a National Park of Canada in recognition of the area's Mi'kmaw history, intact old growth Acadian forest, and rare wildlife communities.

== Recreation ==
=== Camping ===
The main Jeremy's Bay campground has 355 campsites, many suitable for large RVs, and generates about $1 million per year in fees. A group campground for up to 80 people is located at Jim Charles Point, named after the eponymous local Mi'kmaw guide who lived at the site in the mid-1800s. Kejimkujik is a popular backcountry camping destination, offering the largest selection of backcountry wilderness campsites found in a national park in the Canadian Maritimes (46 backcountry campsites in total). Many of the park's backcountry campsites are accessible only via canoe, but some can be accessed by hiking or biking into the backcountry as well. Two cabins are available for campers to rent in the park's backcountry, one of which is original from the region's sporting era, and the other is a replica of a historic hunting cabin that existed in the area.

=== Canoeing ===
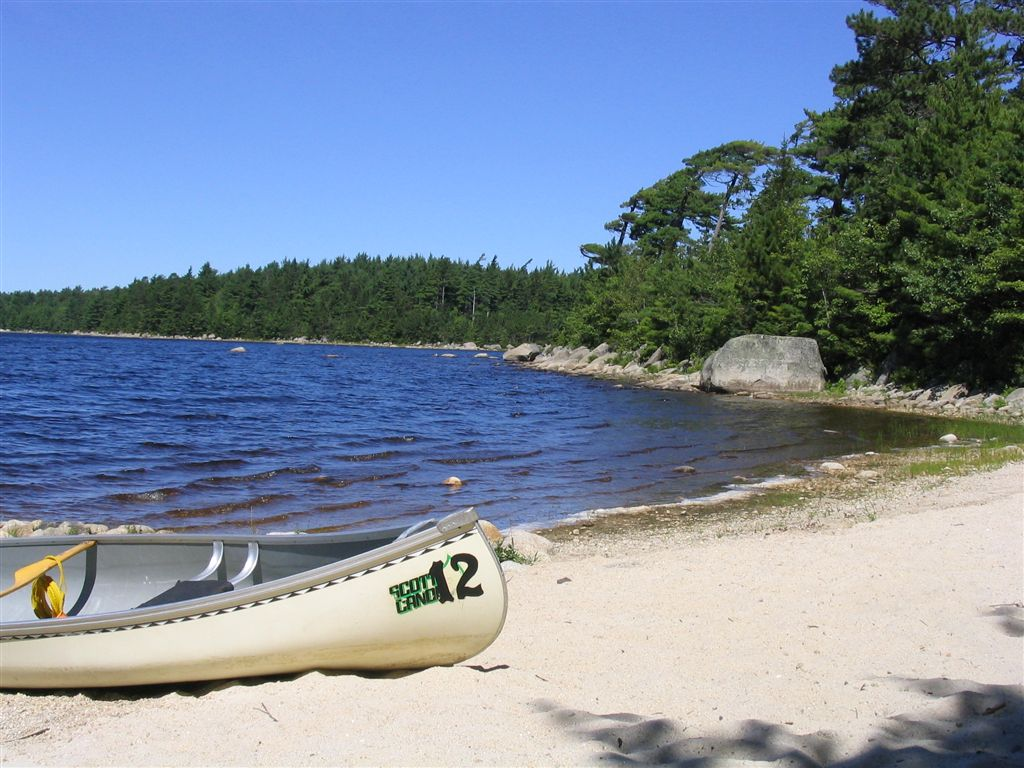
A canoe on a sandy beach at Peskowesk Lake.

Often considered among the top paddling destinations in Atlantic Canada (thanks to its historic portage routes and many lakes), Kejimkujik is a popular destination for canoeing, kayaking, and stand-up paddleboarding. Much of the park's backcountry, including many of its backcountry campsites, can only be accessed by paddling. Park staff maintain a network of portages (many of them centuries old) for ease of moving between the park's lakes. Common canoe routes in the park include a loop connecting Big Dam, Frozen Ocean, and Channel Lakes, as well as the lakes south and west of Kejmkujik Lake, including Peskowesk and Peskawa lakes. From Peskawa Lake, it is possible to reach the Shelburne River and enter the Tobeatic Wilderness Area, located just outside the park. An independent outfitter operating at Jake's Landing offers canoe, kayak, and other equipment rentals for park visitors.

=== Biking ===
In addition to the main parkway road, Kejimkujik has eight trails designated for biking (in addition to hiking). Some of the backcountry campsites can also be accessed by biking, including both of the park's backcountry cabin rentals. The park's newest trail, Ukme'k (meaning "twisted" in the Mi'kmaq language), includes technical features specifically intended for mountain bikers.

== Flora ==
Renowned for its large swaths of intact forest, Kejimkujik protects vast areas of Acadian forest, including both upland areas and forested wetlands. Most of the park's forest is second growth, having been subjected to heavy logging and human-caused forest fires in the two centuries prior to the park's establishment. Despite this, several areas of the park still host original old-growth forest. The stands of original forest found in Kejimkujik represent some of the last remaining old growth forest in the Canadian Maritimes and are considered among the park's greatest ecological attributes. Old growth forest in the park consists primarily of eastern hemlock, yellow birch, American beech, sugar maple, and red maple. Overall, about one fifth of the park's forest consists of conifer species. Hemlock forests in Kejimkujik are threatened by the invasive hemlock woolly adelgid, which was first detected in the park in 2018. Since its detection, Parks Canada has been implementing various measures to actively control and research the effects of this pest in the park.

Wildflowers bloom from April through October and common species include starflower, rose twisted-stalk, twinflower, painted trillium, pink ladyslipper, northern blue flag iris, and threeleaf goldthread. Several carnivorous plants are found in Kejimkujik, including purple pitcher plant, spoonleaf sundew, and horned bladderwort. Kejimkujik also hosts a high diversity of parasitic plants, including eastern dwarf mistletoe, pinesap, ghost pipe, beech drops, and American cancer-root. Kejimkujik is considered a hotspot for Atlantic Coastal Plain Flora, a group of 90 unrelated plants, many of them rare in Canada, that are slow-growing and are specialists in habitats with high disturbance and low fertility. Two of the three known lakes in Canada that host water pennywort are found in Kejimkujik National Park. Overall, there are some 544 species of vascular plants known from the park.

== Fauna ==
Some 34 species of mammal are known to occur within the park, including: snowshoe hare, northern flying squirrel, beaver, porcupine, North American river otter, fisher, American ermine, bobcat, eastern coyote, American black bear and white-tailed deer. Moose were formerly common in the area that is now Kejimkujik, but are today very rare; having been listed as an endangered species in mainland Nova Scotia. In 1986, Kejimkujik was the site of reintroduction efforts for American marten, which continue to inhabit the park in low densities.

Considered to be a regional hotspot for herptile diversity, the park's wetlands and forests host a greater variety of amphibians and reptiles than anywhere else in Atlantic Canada. Many of the reptiles inhabiting Kejimkujik are considered to be species at risk in Canada, like Blanding's turtle, and eastern ribbonsnake. Other herptiles found in Kejimkujik include common snapping turtle, eastern painted turtle, garter snake, ringnecked snake, smooth greensnake, red-bellied snake, spotted salamander, eastern red-backed salamander, eastern newt, and four-toed salamander. Frogs found in the park include: American bullfrog, green frog, pickerel frog, wood frog, leopard frog, American toad, and spring peeper.

Birds often encountered in Kejimkujik include hermit thrush, ovenbird, white-breasted nuthatch, American woodcock, eastern wood pewee, barn swallow, northern parula, yellow-bellied sapsucker, ruffed grouse, common loon, barred owl, and the American black duck.

Formerly an esteemed angling destination (primarily for brook trout), Kejimkujik's native fish stocks have recently been dramatically reduced by the presence of chain pickerel. Chain pickerel was first confirmed in the park in 2018, and has since spread to much of Kejimkujik's waterways. Chain pickerel are both a predator on and a direct competitor of brook trout, forcing the park to adopt mandatory release requirements for all trout (and all native fish generally) landed by anglers in the park. Parks Canada has taken action to mitigate some of the effects of chain pickerel, and is actively researching long-term solutions to reduce the fish's impact. Other fish found in Kejimkujik's waterways include yellow perch, white perch, white sucker, brown bullhead, American eel, golden shiner, banded killifish, creek chub, nine-spined stickleback. Historically, the park stocked populations of brown trout and lake whitefish to enhance angling, but this practice was discontinued.

Common loons in the park have the highest levels of methyl mercury in their blood of any loons in North America, the result of bioaccumulation from their environment. This has led to reductions in their reproduction rate. Yellow perch, 10–15 cm (3.9–5.9 in) long, is their main source of food, and these have been found to have more than twice the mercury level than those from neighbouring New Brunswick.

== Geography ==
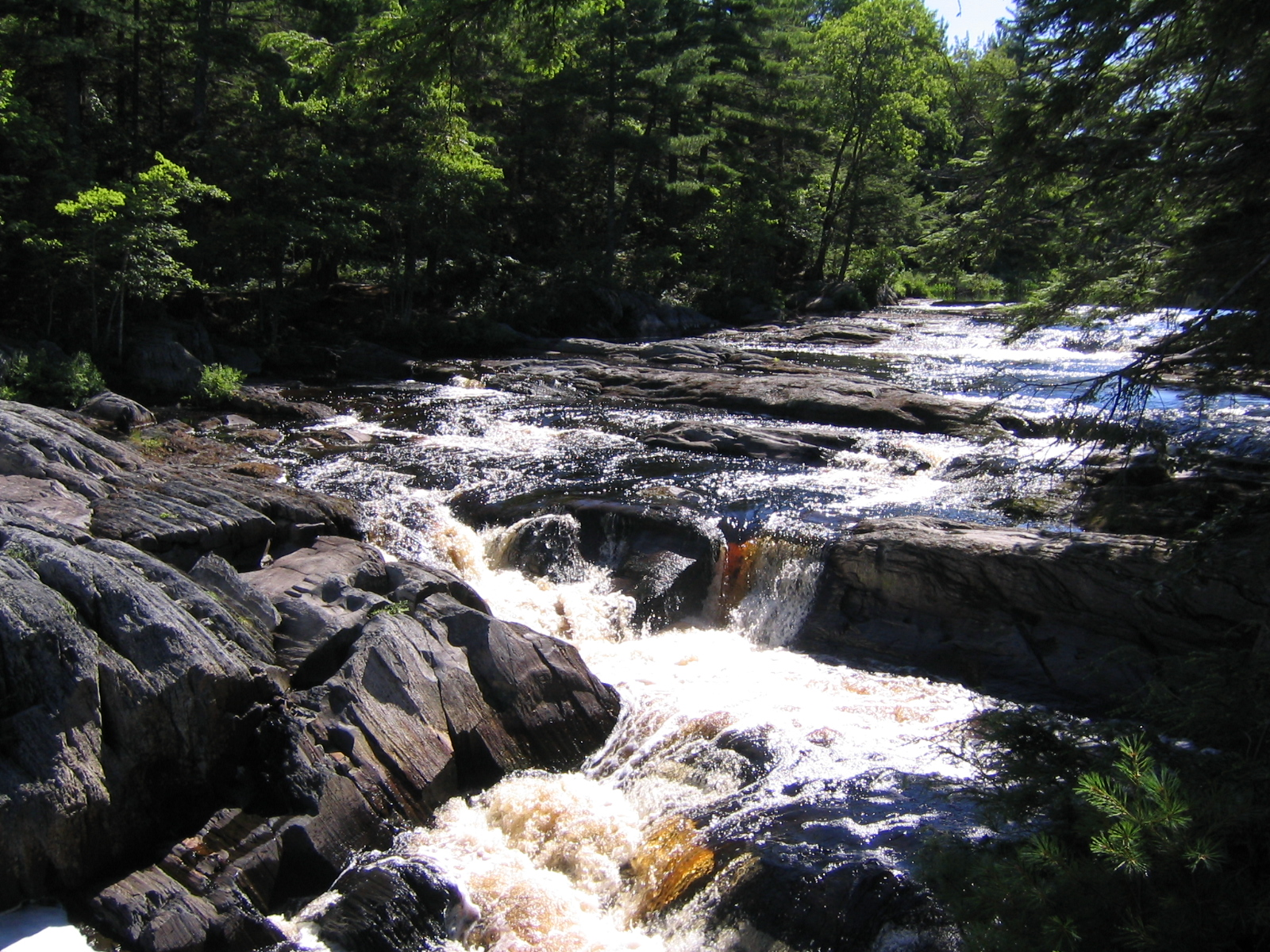
The Mersey River flowing over exposed bedrock in Kejimkujik.

The park is located in a flat plain. Its highest point, Mount Tom, is at 180 m (590 ft). Precambrian to Ordovician quartzite and slate form the bedrock, along with Devonian granite. These rocks provide few nutrients to the soils that develop from them. Podzols are found in well-drained areas, which poorly-drained areas are dominated by Gleysols and peat bog.

Fifteen percent of the park is covered by lakes. Evidence of the Last Glacial Period include drumlins, erratics, and eskers scattered throughout the park. Major rivers include the Mersey and the Shelburne (which runs just south of Kejimkujik). The park is renowned for its numerous freshwater lakes, with some 46 lakes occurring within the park's boundaries. The largest of these are Kejimkujik (Nova Scotia's second largest freshwater lake), Peskowesk, and Peskawa.

=== Climate ===
The park has a humid continental climate (Köppen climate classification Dfb) with four distinct seasons. Being located inland, in the western part of Nova Scotia, the park has warmer temperatures and higher precipitation than eastern sections of Nova Scotia. Winters are cold with a January average of −5.0 °C (23.0 °F). During this time of the year, the maximum temperature often stays below freezing although frequent mild spells push maximum temperatures above freezing frequently (about 12–19 days from December to February) and occasionally above 10 °C (50.0 °F) when the wind is from the southwest. On average, there are 3.3 days where the temperature falls below −20.0 °C (−4.0 °F) per year. Winters are characterized by stretches of unsettled weather, resulting in high precipitation and cloud cover. Snowfall is high, averaging 243.7 centimetres (95.9 in) a year.

Summers are warm with a July average of 19.6 °C (67.3 °F) and precipitation is lower (though significant) than the winter months. Temperatures in the park rarely exceed 30.0 °C (86.0 °F), occurring on 5.9 days per year owing to the moderating influence of the ocean. Spring and fall are transitional seasons that feature mild temperature although they are unpredictable. The park receives 1,453.0 millimetres (57 in) of precipitation per year, which is fairly evenly distributed throughout the year.

Climate data for Kejimkujik National Park, 1991–2020 normals, extremes 1966–present
Month	Jan	Feb	Mar	Apr	May	Jun	Jul	Aug	Sep	Oct	Nov	Dec	Year
Record high °C (°F)	18.0 (64.4)	17.6 (63.7)	27.9 (82.2)	31.5 (88.7)	33.3 (91.9)	34.4 (93.9)	34.4 (93.9)	36.5 (97.7)	34.0 (93.2)	29.3 (84.7)	22.9 (73.2)	17.6 (63.7)	36.5 (97.7)
Mean daily maximum °C (°F)	−0.5 (31.1)	0.5 (32.9)	4.4 (39.9)	10.6 (51.1)	17.2 (63.0)	22.0 (71.6)	25.5 (77.9)	25.0 (77.0)	20.8 (69.4)	14.2 (57.6)	8.2 (46.8)	2.6 (36.7)	12.5 (54.5)
Daily mean °C (°F)	−5.0 (23.0)	−4.3 (24.3)	−0.6 (30.9)	5.2 (41.4)	11.1 (52.0)	16.0 (60.8)	19.6 (67.3)	19.1 (66.4)	15.1 (59.2)	9.1 (48.4)	4.0 (39.2)	−1.4 (29.5)	7.3 (45.1)
Mean daily minimum °C (°F)	−9.6 (14.7)	−9.1 (15.6)	−5.5 (22.1)	−0.2 (31.6)	5.0 (41.0)	9.9 (49.8)	13.8 (56.8)	13.2 (55.8)	9.4 (48.9)	3.9 (39.0)	−0.2 (31.6)	−5.3 (22.5)	2.1 (35.8)
Record low °C (°F)	−31.0 (−23.8)	−34.0 (−29.2)	−27.0 (−16.6)	−15.6 (3.9)	−7.8 (18.0)	−2.0 (28.4)	0.0 (32.0)	−1.0 (30.2)	−5.0 (23.0)	−8.9 (16.0)	−17.0 (1.4)	−29.0 (−20.2)	−34.0 (−29.2)
Average precipitation mm (inches)	158.5 (6.24)	117.8 (4.64)	124.1 (4.89)	113.6 (4.47)	105.8 (4.17)	96.8 (3.81)	76.0 (2.99)	93.2 (3.67)	116.6 (4.59)	144.1 (5.67)	160.6 (6.32)	146.1 (5.75)	1,453 (57.20)
Average snowfall cm (inches)	71.7 (28.2)	53.4 (21.0)	39.1 (15.4)	12.9 (5.1)	0.7 (0.3)	0.0 (0.0)	0.0 (0.0)	0.0 (0.0)	0.0 (0.0)	2.3 (0.9)	12.3 (4.8)	51.2 (20.2)	243.7 (95.9)
Average precipitation days (≥ 0.2 mm)	19.7	17.0	16.7	16.1	17.7	15.6	14.2	14.1	16.1	17.1	18.2	19.4	201.8
Average snowy days (≥ 0.2 cm)	10.6	8.4	5.8	2.1	0.1	0.0	0.0	0.0	0.0	0.1	2.0	8.3	37.4
Average relative humidity (%) (at 15:00 LST)	78.0	70.1	60.5	58.0	57.5	60.3	60.3	60.4	63.8	66.8	75.9	80.6	66.0
Source: Environment Canada (snow 1971–2000)

== Trails ==
- Mersey Meadow: Easy, Linear, 70 metres one way
- Mill Falls: Easy, Linear, 2 kilometres return
- Beech Grove: Moderate, Loop, 2.2 kilometres
- Flowing Waters: Easy, Loop 1 kilometre
- Hemlocks and Hardwoods: Moderate, Loop, 5 kilometres
- Farmlands: Moderate, Loop, 1.1 kilometres
- Rogers Brook: Easy, Loop, 1 kilometres
- Grafton Woods: Easy, Loop, 1,6 kilometres
- Snake Lake: Moderate, Loop, 3 kilometres
- Gold Mines: Moderate, Linear, 1.5 kilometres one way (closed)
- Peter Point: Moderate, Linear, 1.9 kilometres one way
- Mersey River: Easy, Linear, 3.5 kilometres one way
- Slapfoot: Moderate, Linear, 3.2 kilometres one way
- Jake's Landing to Merrymakedge Beach: Moderate, Linear, 3 kilometres one way
- Ukem'k: Moderate, Linear, 6.3 kilometres one way
- Eel Weir to Fire Tower: Moderate, Linear, 19.5 kilometres return
- Channel Lake: Difficult, Loop, 24 kilometres
- Liberty Lake: Difficult, Linear, 60.5 kilometres

== Kejimkujik in media ==
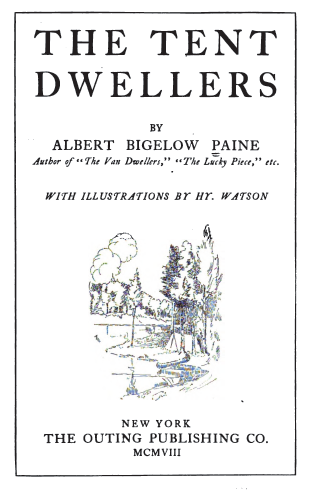
Title page of the first addition printing of The Tent Dwellers (1908).

The novel, The Tent Dwellers by Albert Paine, chronicles his travels through inland Nova Scotia with his companion, Edward Breck, and their two hired guides on a trout fishing trip in 1906. The trip's route took the party through what is now Kejimkujik National Park and the nearby Tobeatic Game Reserve during the height of the region's sport fishing era. The details documented by Paine in The Tent Dwellers provide a valuable first-hand account of the region's landscape and wildlife as they existed in the early 20th century. Today, The Tent Dwellers is closely associated with Kejimkujik's camping culture, and canoe expeditions retracing the novel's original 1906 route are occasionally undertaken by canoeing enthusiasts.

Several literary works of fiction have featured Kejimkujik as a primary setting, including A Canoer of Shorelines by Anne M. Smith-Nochasak, and the children's book, The King of Keji by Jan L. Coates. The book, Images of the Keji Country by Don Pentz, features a collection of watercolour paintings illustrating the landscape and waterways of Kejimkujik.

== Kejimkujik Seaside ==
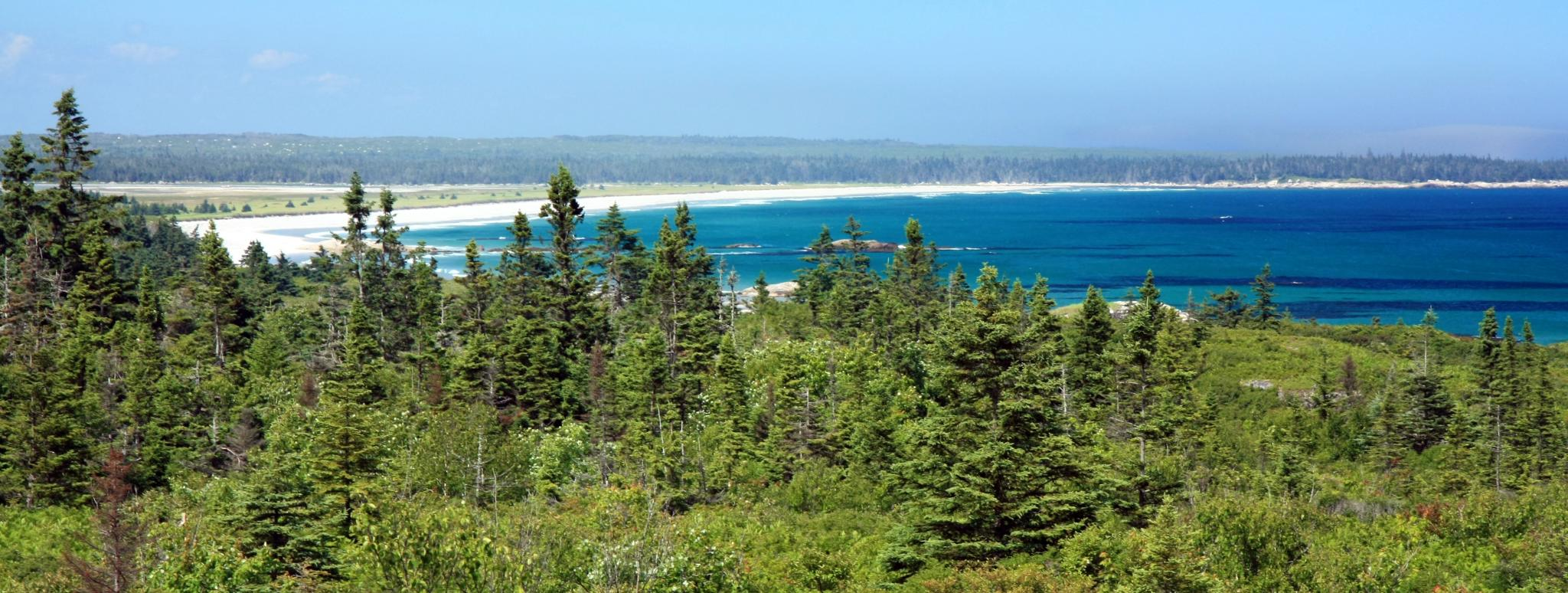
A view of St. Catherine's River Beach (background) with the park's coastal forest in the foreground.

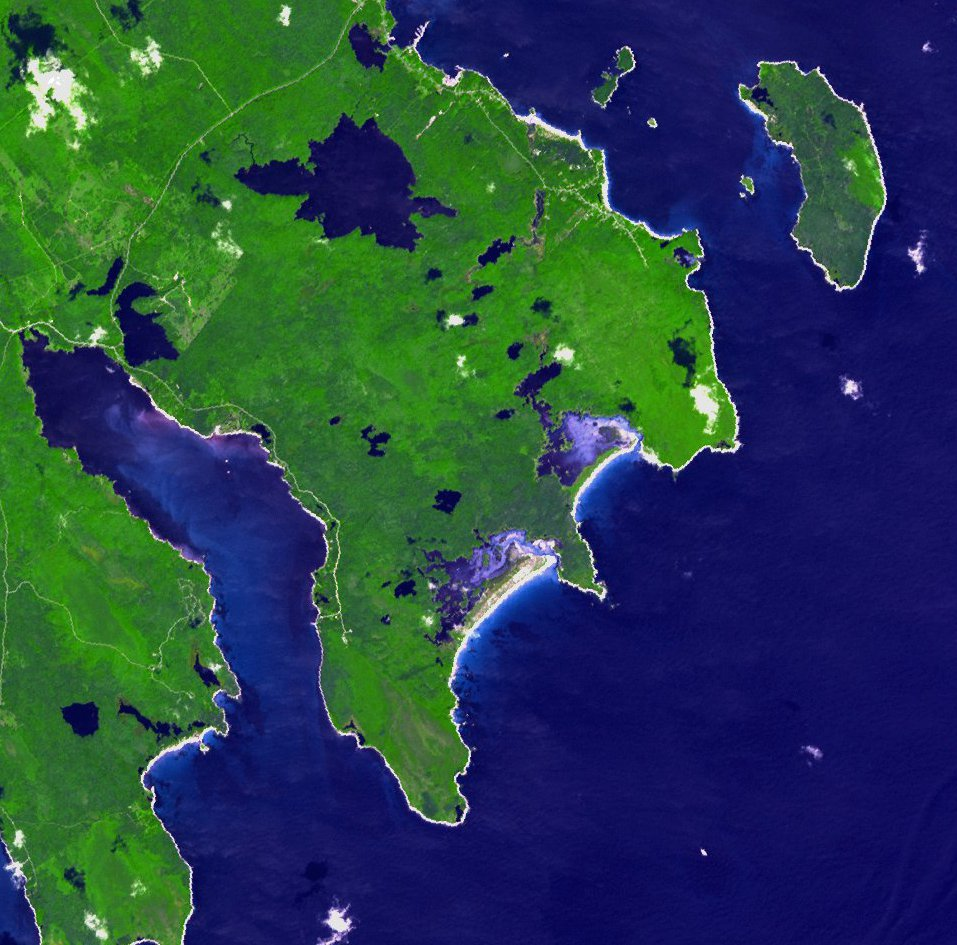
Satellite imagery of Kejimkujik National Park Seaside and the surrounding Atlantic Ocean. St. Catherine's River Beach and Little Port Joli Beach are both visible.

Kejimkujik Seaside, known formally as Kejimkujik National Park Seaside, is a day-use park administered by Parks Canada, located south of the village of Port Mouton along Nova Scotia's Atlantic coast. While geographically separate and ecologically distinct from Kejimkujik National Park's inland portion (located 93 kilometres away), Kejimkujik National Park Seaside was established and added to Kejimkujik National Park in 1988 to ensure the unique coastal features of mainland Nova Scotia's Atlantic coast were represented in Canada's national parks system.

=== Ecology and Wildlife of Kejimkujik Seaside ===
Kejimkujik National Park Seaside encompasses 22 square kilometres of coastal wilderness, including examples of coastal barrens, regionally rare forests characterized by high humidity, bogs, barrier beaches, and shallow lagoons. Renowned for its white sand, St. Catherine's River Beach, located within the park, is one of the largest protected beaches in Nova Scotia. Forest occurring within Kejimkujik National Park Seaside has been found to host unique lichen assemblages, including several species at risk like blue felt lichen.

Wildlife hosted at Kejimkujik Seaside includes species like American black bear, white-tailed deer, raccoon, American mink, and many shorebirds; including semi-palmated sandpipers, least sandpipers, willets, semipalmated plovers, and sanderlings. The park also protects important nesting habitat for piping plover, a species listed as endangered in Canada (COSEWIC). The shallow waters immediately offshore of the park host harbour seals and grey seals.

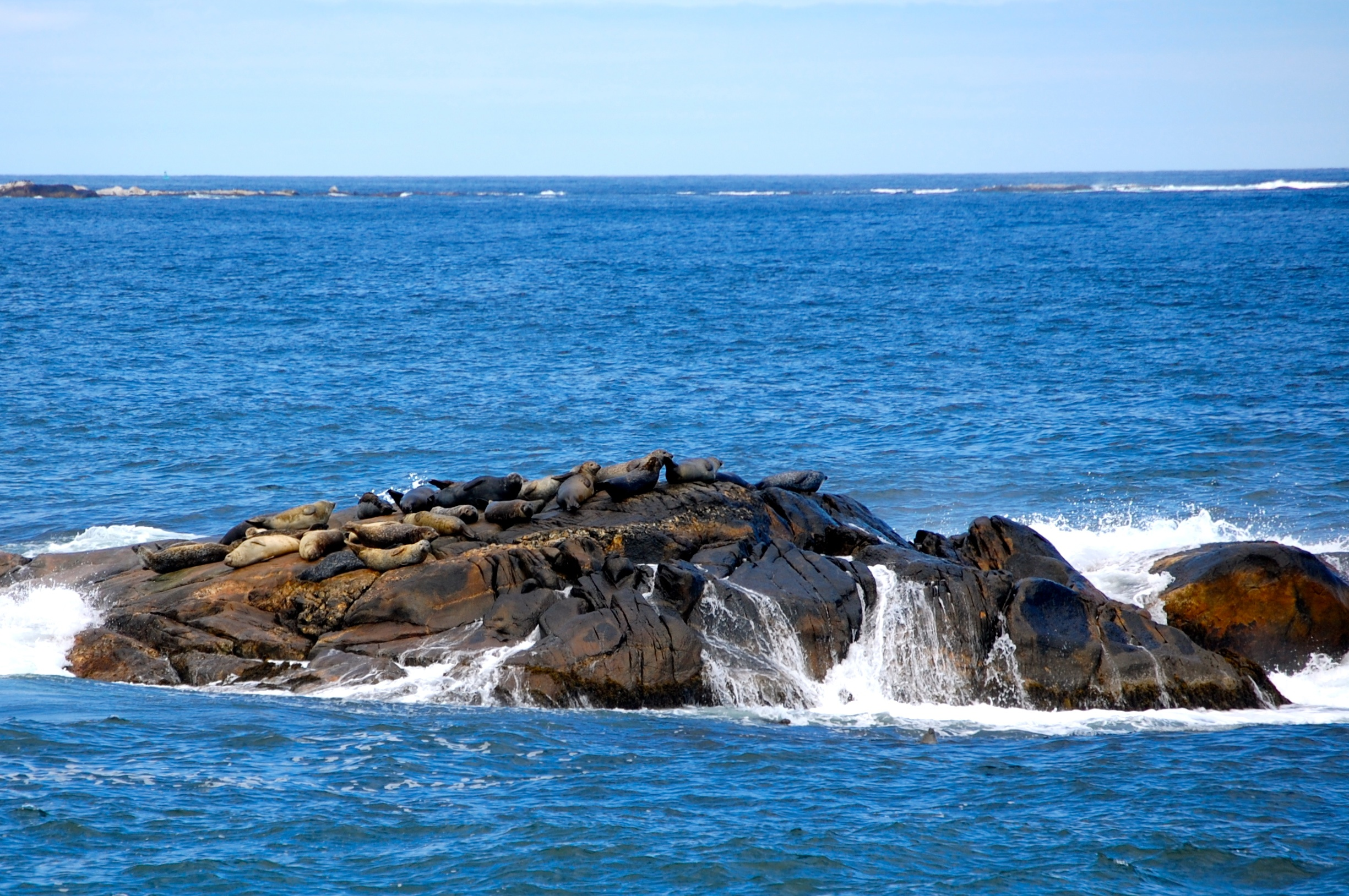
A group of seals resting on a rock outcrop off Kejimkujik Seaside.

The ecology of the park's estuaries has been severely impacted by the effects of European green crab, an invasive species, on local eelgrass beds. Eelgrass, often considered a keystone species, provides nursery habitat for a range of marine invertebrates and fish. In particular, eelgrass beds in the park are important to juvenile soft-shelled clams, a species with local significance as a commercial fishery. The effects of European green crab have been linked to a substantial decline in the number of juvenile soft-shelled clams found in the park's estuaries.

=== History of Kejimkujik Seaside ===
Human usage of the area that is now known as Kejimkujik Seaside dates back thousands of years, with a spear head made by the ancestors of the Mi'kmaq some 2500-5000 years ago having been found in the park. The Mi'kmaq likely used the area for hunting and foraging in more recent times. Around 1604, Samuel de Champlain camped in and mapped the area around Port Mouton, including the landscape now included within the park. The earliest European settlement in what is now Kejimkujik Seaside, dating to the late 18th century, included a homestead built by free black loyalists.

=== Recreation at Kejimkujik Seaside ===
In addition to its renowned stretches of white-sand beaches and turquoise-coloured coastal waters (St. Catherine's River Beach), Kejimkujik National Park Seaside boasts two coastal hiking trails, Harbour Rocks Trail (2.6 km one-way) and Port Joli Head Trail (4.75 km one-way). Kejimkujik Seaside is a popular picnic and birdwatching destination.

== See also ==
- List of National Parks of Canada
- List of parks in Nova Scotia
