= Tobeatic Wilderness Area =

Wilderness area in Nova Scotia, Canada

- IUCN category Ib (wilderness area)
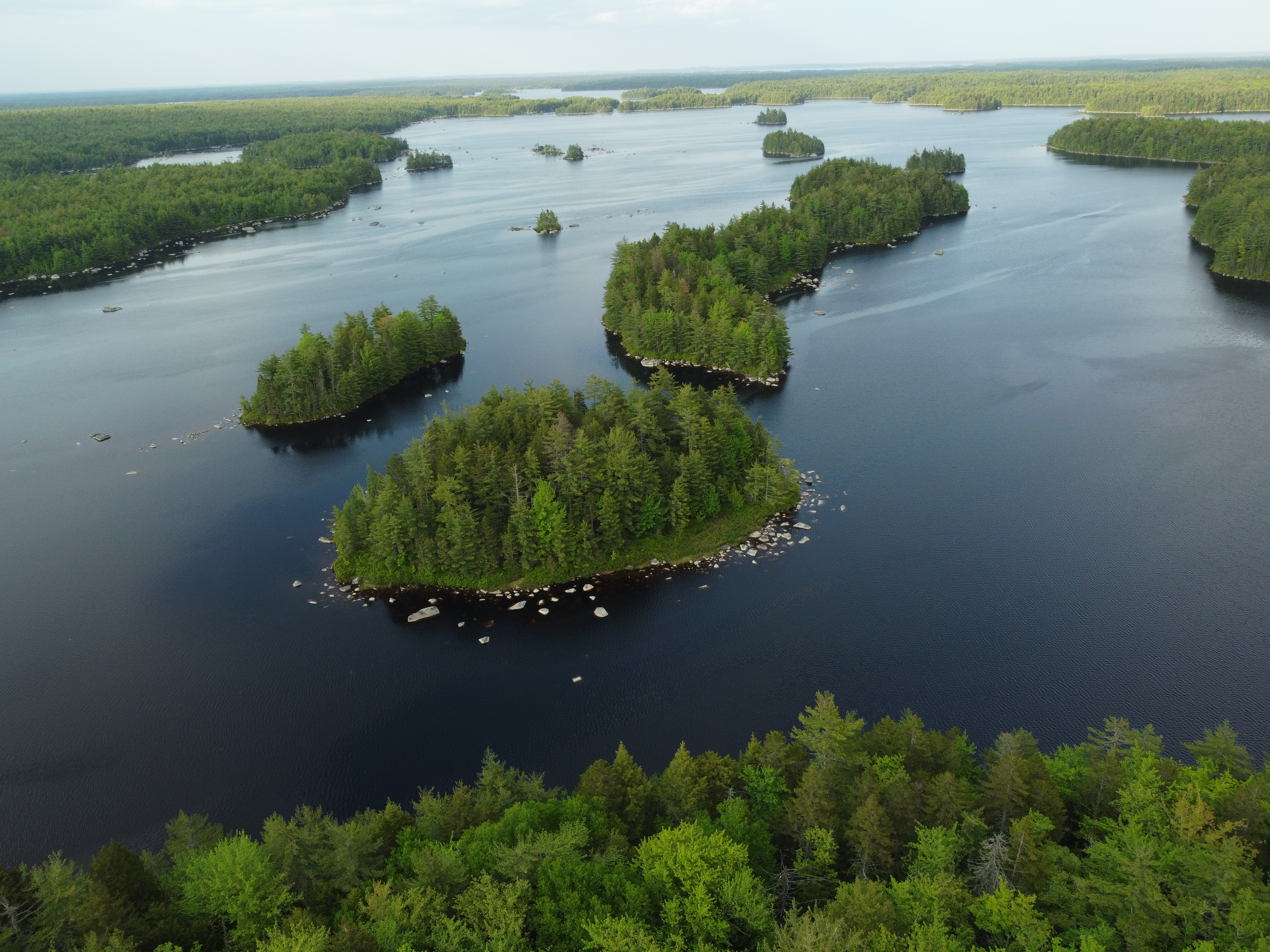
- An aerial photograph of the western end of Tobeatic Lake and some of its islands, located in the Tobeatic Wilderness Area.
- Interactive map of Tobeatic Wilderness Area
- Location: Nova Scotia, Canada
- Coordinates: 44°14′51″N 65°34′50″W
- Area: 120,000 ha (1,200 km^{2})
- Established: 1927
- Governing body: Nova Scotia Department of Natural Resources and Renewables

The Tobeatic Wilderness Area is the largest protected area in the Canadian Maritimes, located in southwestern Nova Scotia. It contains nearly 120,000 hectares of land and spans parts of five counties, Annapolis, Digby, Queens, Shelburne and Yarmouth. Located adjacent to Kejimkujik National Park, it was formerly known as the Tobeatic Wildlife Management Area, and the Tobeatic Game Reserve.

== History ==
The name Tobeatic is derived from "Place of the Alder" in the Mi'kmaq language. Archaeological research shows that the Mi’kmaq people were present in the Tobeatic at least 4500 years ago.

In 1927, a portion of the area was designated as a game sanctuary. In 1968, it was designated as a Wildlife Management Area. In 1998 it was designated as one of 31 Wilderness Areas in the province. It is managed by the Department of Environment and Climate Change for the province in partnership with the Department of Natural Resources and Renewables. In 2015, nearly 16,000 hectares were added to the wilderness area.

== Geography ==
It contains large areas of Acadian forest. The geography is varied, consisting of wetlands, woodlands, scrublands and barrens. The landscape was shaped by the last glaciation, which left glacial barrens, erratics, drumlins, eskers, moraines, hummocks, outwash plains and kettle lakes. It is composed of several geological units including the Goldenville Formation, the Halifax Formation, and Middle to Late Devonian biotite monzogranite and leucomonzogranite.

Wildlife includes eastern moose and white-tailed deer.

The region has many lakes and rivers including the Shelburne, Clyde, and Tusket rivers.

== Public access ==
Primitive hunting and public leasing of land is allowed, with hunters only allowed to hunt for six consecutive days commencing on the third Monday in October each year with only a muzzleloader, bow or crossbow. Campsites, canoe routes, and portages are not as developed or maintained as the nearby Kejimkujik. Motorized vehicle use within the reserve is not permitted. Along with Kejimkujik, the Tobeatic is part of the UNESCO designated Southwest Nova Biosphere Reserve.

== In popular culture ==
The area is the setting for the 1908 Albert Paine novel, The Tent Dwellers, which chronicles a three-week fishing trip through the area.
