= The Hollow Tree Snowed-In Book =

Children's short story collection by Albert Bigelow Paine

- First edition cover (pub. Harper & Brothers)
- Author: Albert Bigelow Paine
- Illustrator: J. M. Condé
- Language: English
- Publisher: Harper & Brothers
- Publication date: January 1, 1910
- Pages: 285
- ISBN: 978-0-848-81121-1

The Hollow Tree Snowed-In Book is a children's book of short stories written by Albert Bigelow Paine and illustrated by J. M. Condé. It was published by Harper & Brothers in 1910. The book contains the continued tales of the 'Coon, the 'Possum, and the Old Black Crow, who live in the Hollow Tree in the Deep Woods.

These books contain pen-and-ink illustrations of the stories.

The general setting of this book is 'the story teller' who sits in a rocking chair in front of the old fireplace, with the 'Little Lady' sitting on his lap as he smokes a pipe and tells the old stories of the Hollow Tree Folk.

All the stories in this book are stories told by the various characters when there is a big snow storm and they get snowed in. To pass the time they tell stories.

== Editions ==
There are two editions of this book. Both have an embossed picture on the front of Mr. Rabbit and Mr. Turtle at the door to the hollow tree being greeted by Mr. Crow. Both editions have a dark green background, with white snow and black outlines. The difference between the editions is that one has an orange sky in the background, and the other does not.

== The Hollow Tree Series ==
- The Hollow Tree and Deep Woods Book (1901)
- The Hollow Tree Snowed-In Book (1910)
- Hollow Tree Nights and Days (1915)
