= 497593 Kejimkujik =

Astronomical object

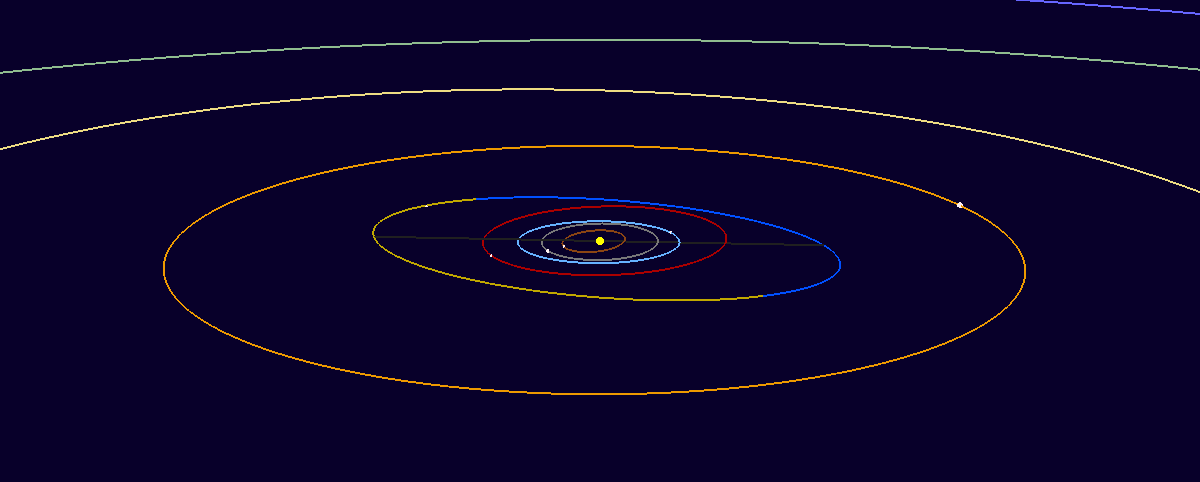
- 497593 Kejimkujik's orbit shown in yellow and blue

Discovery
- Discovered by: Paul Wiegert
- Discovery site: Mauna Kea Observatories
- Discovery date: 1 May 2006

Designations
- Pronunciation: /ˌkɛdʒɪməˈkuːdʒɪk/
- Named after: Kejimkujik National Park
- Alternative designations: 2006 JU_{69} · 2010 CY_{119}

Orbital characteristics
- Epoch 2461000.5 TDB (21 November 2025)
- Aphelion: 2.958401588141525 AU
- Perihelion: 2.775718241912334 AU
- Semi-major axis: 2.86705991502693 AU
- Eccentricity: 0.0318590039349554
- Orbital period (sidereal): 4.854710708561128 years
- Mean anomaly: 305.1715516630285°
- Mean motion: 0.2030247202226563° per day
- Inclination: 4.925512866784786°
- Longitude of ascending node: 217.6151037621041°
- Argument of perihelion: 65.16943448094455°
- Star: Sun
- Earth MOID: 1.76231 AU
- Mercury MOID: 2.31894 AU
- Venus MOID: 2.05316 AU
- Mars MOID: 1.23511 AU
- Jupiter MOID: 2.07086 AU
- Saturn MOID: 6.06827 AU
- Uranus MOID: 15.4862 AU
- Neptune MOID: 26.8571 AU

Physical characteristics
- Mean diameter: 1.2 km
- Absolute magnitude (H): 17.25 (JPL) – 17.27 (IAU)

497593 Kejimkujik is a main-belt minor planet, first observed on 1 May 2006 by Paul Wiegert at the Mauna Kea Observatories. It was designated 2006 JU_{69}, and later received the duplicate designation 2010 CY_{119}. Kejimkujik is about 1.2 miles (1.9 km) across and can be seen only with professional telescopes.

== Naming ==
On 13 June 2022, the International Astronomical Union approved the name Kejimkujik for minor planet 497593. It is named after Kejimkujik National Park in Nova Scotia, Canada, which is recognized for its natural and cultural significance and its designation as a Dark Sky Preserve by the Royal Astronomical Society of Canada in 2010. The naming proposal was supported by members of the Royal Astronomical Society of Canada and representatives of the Acadia First Nation. Its SPKID is 20497593.

== Orbital elements ==
Kejimkujik orbits the Sun in the main asteroid belt, with a perihelion of approximately 2.77 AU and an inclination of roughly 4.925° with respect to the ecliptic. Of the fifteen "Nova Scotia Asteroids" named after people or places connected to Nova Scotia, it has the least orbital eccentricity – about 0.03, which is nearly circular. It completes one orbit around the sun in approximately 4.85 years.

== See also ==
- List of minor planets: 497001–498000
- Asteroid belt
