= The Tent Dwellers =

1908 book by Albert Bigelow Paine

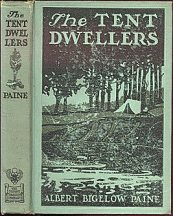
- First edition cover
- Author: Albert Bigelow Paine
- Language: English
- Genre: Non-fiction
- Publication date: 1908

The Tent Dwellers is a book by Albert Bigelow Paine, chronicling his travels through inland Nova Scotia on a trout fishing trip with Dr. Edward "Eddie" Breck, and with guides Charles "the Strong" (Charlie Charlton of Milford, NS) and Del "the Stout" (Del Thomas of Milford, NS), one June in the early 1900s. Originally published in 1908, The story starts at what is now known as the Legendary Milford House; author Albert Bigelow Paine, (Mark Twain’s biographer), chronicled his first impression of the Milford House Lodge in his famous book, in the following way … "Then at last came a church, a scattering string of houses, a neat white hotel and the edge of the wilderness had been reached." Those travelling today from Annapolis Royal will witness little change in the scenery or the impact from this turn of the century description. The book takes place in what is now Kejimkujik National Park (or "Kedgeemakoogee", as Paine spelled it) and the adjacent Tobeatic Game Reserve. The Reserve later became the Tobeatic Wildlife Management Area, and in 1998 was included within the newly created Tobeatic Wilderness Area.

Paine was well known in American literary circles at the time, chiefly as the biographer of Mark Twain. Breck held a PhD, spoke five languages, and was listed in Who's Who in America.

== Summary ==
The book chronicles a three-week fishing trip through central Nova Scotia, and is an excellent account of the unspoiled Nova Scotia wilderness that existed at the time, which has been largely diminished since. The group encounters moose (which Eddie tries to capture and bring back alive), beaver, and numerous trout, the first of which is now very scarce in the region, and legions of mosquitos, moose flies, black flies, noseeums, and midges, all of which are regrettably abundant to this day.

Many of the areas described in the book, then uncharted, are now known to back-country campers in Kejimkujik Park and the Tobeatic Wilderness Area. The descriptions of the central Nova Scotia woods contained in the book are notably accurate, and while the trout which brought Paine and Breck to Nova Scotia are less abundant, due in part to acid rain and increased fishing pressure, they still provide good sport for anglers.

The area covered by the Tent Dwellers. Kejimkujik National Park now covers the upper half of this map, Tobeatic covers the lower half.

Paine initially had some difficulties with the lack of modern amenities, but eventually came to appreciate the landscape and lifestyle. His advice to readers and potential campers was as follows:

"...if you are willing to get wet and stay wet - to get cold and stay cold - to be bruised, and scuffed, and bitten - to be hungry and thirsty, and to have your muscles strained and sore from unusual taxation: if you will welcome all these things, not once, but many times, for the sake of moments of pure triumph and that larger luxury which comes with the comfort of the camp and the conquest of the wilderness, then go! The wilderness will welcome you, and teach you, and take you to its heart. And you will find your own soul there; and the discovery will be worth while!"

== Reception and legacy ==
The Tent Dwellers was well received by critics and readers alike when it was first published in 1908. The book was praised for its humorous and vivid descriptions of the Nova Scotia wilderness and its inhabitants, as well as for its insights into the joys and challenges of camping and fishing. The book also appealed to the growing interest in outdoor recreation and conservation at the time. The New York Times called it “a delightful book, full of the spirit of the woods and waters, and of the good fellowship that goes with a life in the open.” 1

The book has remained popular among anglers, campers, and nature lovers over the years and has been reprinted several times, most recently in 2000 by Nimbus Publishing. The book has also inspired many people to visit and explore the areas that Paine and his companions travelled through, which are now part of Kejimkujik National Park and the Tobeatic Wilderness Area. The book has been recognized as an important historical and literary document of Nova Scotia’s natural and cultural heritage. In 2002, the book was selected as one of the 100 best books of Nova Scotia by the Nova Scotia Library Association.

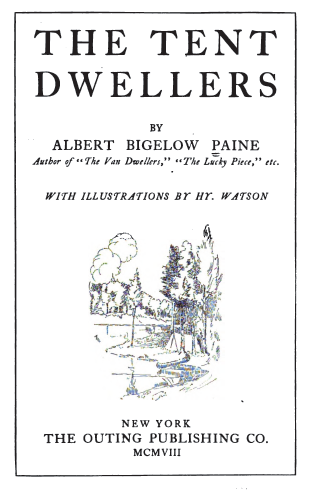
Title page, first edition, 1908

The book has also influenced and been referenced by other writers and artists. Kevin Callan, a Canadian canoeist and author, retraced the 1906 route of The Tent Dwellers in 2017 and documented his trip in a series of videos. The book has also been adapted into a musical play by Nova Scotia playwright Shelley Thompson, which premiered at the Chester Playhouse in 2018. Several novels have also mentioned the book, such as The Bishop’s Man by Linden MacIntyre and The Birth House by Ami McKay.

Other writers and travellers who have explored and written about Nova Scotia have taken inspiration from the text, such as Ernest Thompson Seton, Farley Mowat, Harry Thurston, and Silver Donald Cameron.

== Historical and cultural context ==
The Tent Dwellers reflects the role of fishing and camping in Nova Scotia during an influx of American and European anglers at the turn of the century. The book also showcases the culture and hospitality of the indigenous Nova Scotian Mi’kmaq people; the original inhabitants of the land and guides for many of the visitors.

The book also captures the environmental and social changes that have occurred since the book was published, such as the decline of the trout population due to acid rain and overfishing, the development of roads and railways that made the wilderness more accessible and less pristine, and the establishment of conservation areas and parks that aimed to protect the natural and cultural heritage of the region.

== Equipment in The Tent Dwellers ==
The outdoor paraphernalia described in the book would today be considered antique. Birchbark canoes are used throughout the book, as well as canvas tents. Large sections are devoted to the fishing gear used, specifically the fishing rods and flies.

== Ecology in The Tent Dwellers ==
In many places The Tent Dwellers draws attention to ecological impact on the forest. Paine derisively describes the 'fish hog' as one who catches and kills more fish than he has use for. He writes about the marks left on the land by logging, and about the necessity of always leaving part of the land wild and uninhabited. On the beaver, which was then being trapped nearly to extinction, he wrote:

"Long ago he taught men how to build their houses and dams, and to save up food and water for a dry time. Even if we no longer need him, he deserves our protection and our tender regard."

In advocating sustainable and responsible use of forest lands, Paine was ahead of his time. The regions through which Paine and Breck made their journey are now encompassed by Kejimkujik National Park and Tobeatic Wilderness Area.

Although fish, deer, beaver and porcupines still abound within this area, the moose referred to many times in this book (Alces americana) is endangered and rarely can be seen in this part of Nova Scotia.

Lake Rossignol and the surrounding lakes have changed considerably since this book was written. The outlet to the lake was dammed in 1929, so that Rossignol has expanded to encompass several smaller, formerly separate lakes.

== Literary analysis ==
The Tent Dwellers is a book that combines elements of travelogue, memoir, humour, and nature writing. The book explores various themes, such as the contrast between civilization and wilderness, the friendship and camaraderie among the travellers, the challenges and joys of fishing and camping, and the appreciation and respect for the natural environment and its inhabitants.

The book is written in a conversational and informal style, with frequent use of colloquialisms, slang, and dialect. The book also employs various literary devices, such as irony, exaggeration, understatement, and imagery, to create a humorous and vivid tone. The book is full of witty and amusing anecdotes, observations, and dialogues that often poke fun at the narrator’s mishaps and shortcomings and the eccentricities and quirks of his companions and the locals.

The book also uses symbolism and metaphors to convey deeper meanings and messages. For example, the trout represents both the lure and the reward of the wilderness, as well as the challenge and the skill of the anglers. The tent represents both the shelter and the confinement of the campers, as well as the symbol of their temporary and fragile presence in the woods. The fire represents both the warmth and danger of the camp life and the symbol of their civilization and culture.

The book also portrays the narrator and his companions as distinct and memorable characters, each with their own personality, background, and role. The narrator, Albert Bigelow Paine, is the main protagonist and the voice of the book, who acts as the curious and adventurous explorer, the enthusiastic and optimistic storyteller, and the naive and clumsy novice. Dr. Edward “Eddie” Breck, is the narrator’s friend and fellow traveller, who acts as the experienced and knowledgeable angler, the calm and rational leader, and the daring and reckless adventurer. Charles “the Strong” and Del “the Stout” are the guides and helpers of the travellers, who act as the skilled and loyal woodsmen, the cheerful and humorous companions, and the wise and mysterious mentors.

The book also compares and contrasts with other works of outdoor literature, such as Walden by Henry David Thoreau, The Maine Woods by Henry David Thoreau, The Call of the Wild by Jack London, and A River Runs Through It by Norman Maclean. The book shares some common themes and motifs with these works, such as the quest for self-reliance, the appreciation of nature, and the critique of society. However, the book also differs from these works in some aspects, such as the tone, the purpose, and the perspective. The book is more light-hearted and humorous than these works, which are often more serious and philosophical. The book is more recreational and entertaining than these works, which are often more educational and inspirational. The book is more personal and subjective than these works, which are often more universal and objective.

== See also ==
- Literature of Nova Scotia
