= Xenia, Illinois =

- Village
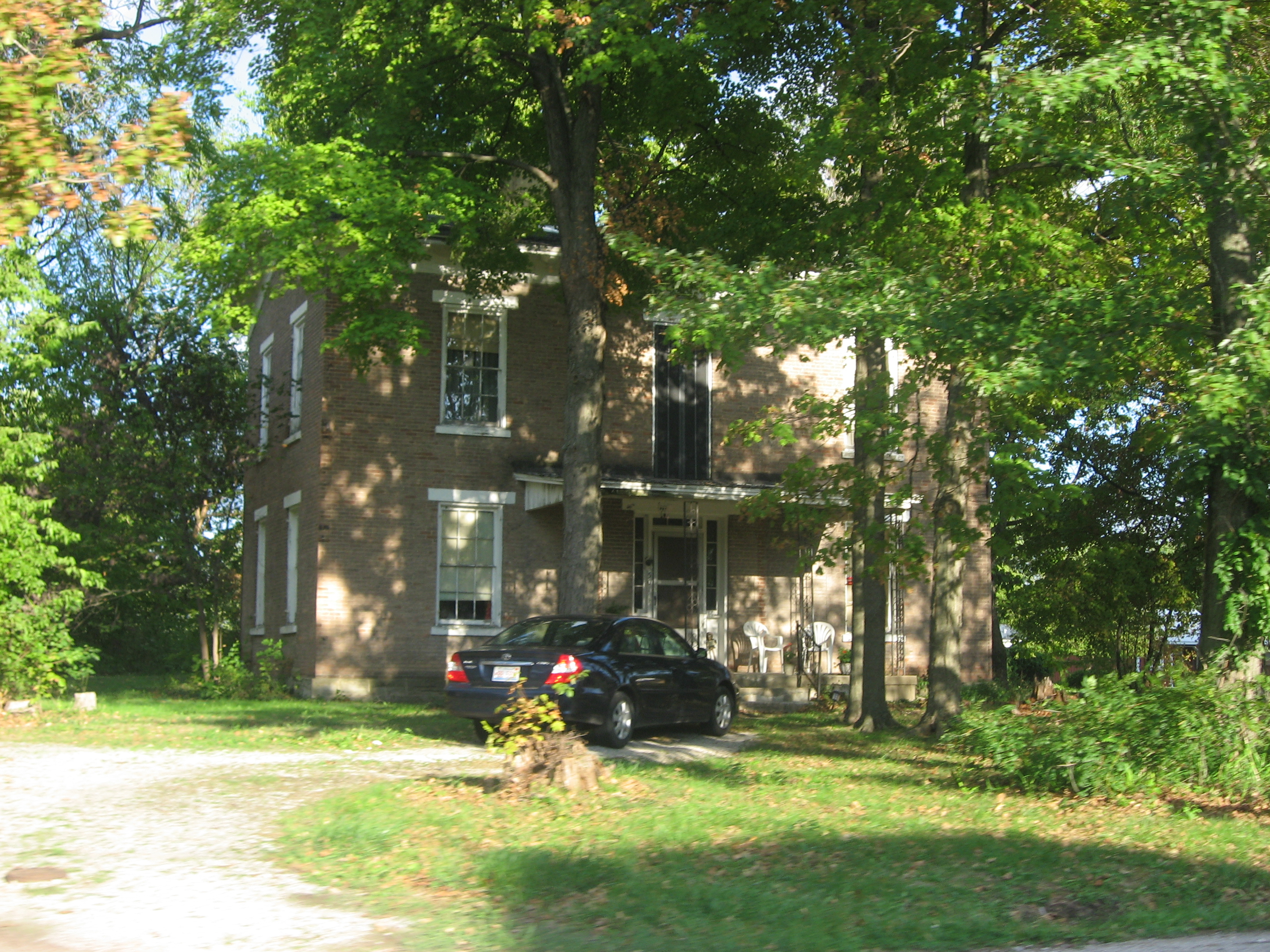
- The Paine House, a historic site

- Location of Xenia in Clay County, Illinois.

- Location of Illinois in the United States
- Coordinates: 38°38′15″N 88°38′15″W
- Country: United States
- State: Illinois
- County: Clay
- Township: Xenia

Area
  - Total: 0.49 sq mi (1.28 km^{2})
  - Land: 0.49 sq mi (1.28 km^{2})
  - Water: 0 sq mi (0.00 km^{2})
- Elevation: 538 ft (164 m)

Population (2020)
  - Total: 380
  - Density: 770.6/sq mi (297.52/km^{2})
- Time zone: UTC-6 (CST)
  - Summer (DST): UTC-5 (CDT)
- Zip code: 62899
- Area code: 618
- FIPS code: 17-83739

Xenia (/ˈziːniə/ ZEE-nee-ə) is a village in Clay County, Illinois, United States. The population was 380 at the 2020 census.

== Geography ==
Xenia is located in southwestern Clay County at 38°38′15″N 88°38′15″W (38.6373694, -88.6374130). U.S. Route 50 passes to the north of the village, leading east 9 miles (14 km) to Flora and west 17 miles (27 km) to Salem.

According to the 2021 census gazetteer files, Xenia has a total area of 0.49 square miles (1.27 km^{2}), all land.

== History ==
The hunting camps of Kiffcart and Retherford were located in the southwest corner of Section 4. The buffalo trail was very wide in this area; therefore, Lewis located in the northwest quarter of Section 3. Lewis remained there until 1830 when he sold his property to Dr. Davenport. A post office was established at the Davenport home with the help of John Pierce and John Gowdy, establishing the town of Xenia. The building of the railroad in 1854 expanded the town, and by 1870 the population had increased to 1,000. A sesquicentennial celebration was held in 1984.

== Demographics ==
Historical population
Census	Pop.	Note	%±
1860	472		—
1870	916		94.1%
1880	898		−2.0%
1890	878		−2.2%
1900	800		−8.9%
1910	634		−20.7%
1920	640		0.9%
1930	559		−12.7%
1940	662		18.4%
1950	643		−2.9%
1960	491		−23.6%
1970	464		−5.5%
1980	475		2.4%
1990	424		−10.7%
2000	407		−4.0%
2010	391		−3.9%
2020	380		−2.8%
U.S. Decennial Census

As of the 2020 census there were 380 people, 156 households, and 85 families residing in the village. The population density was 770.79 inhabitants per square mile (297.60/km^{2}). There were 184 housing units at an average density of 373.23 per square mile (144.10/km^{2}). The racial makeup of the village was 91.58% White, 0.53% Native American, 0.53% Asian, 0.26% from other races, and 7.11% from two or more races. Hispanic or Latino of any race were 3.68% of the population.

There were 156 households, out of which 28.8% had children under the age of 18 living with them, 42.95% were married couples living together, 5.77% had a female householder with no husband present, and 45.51% were non-families. 41.03% of all households were made up of individuals, and 16.67% had someone living alone who was 65 years of age or older. The average household size was 3.32 and the average family size was 2.34.

The village's age distribution consisted of 29.6% under the age of 18, 8.5% from 18 to 24, 21.4% from 25 to 44, 21.1% from 45 to 64, and 19.5% who were 65 years of age or older. The median age was 35.5 years. For every 100 females, there were 108.6 males. For every 100 females age 18 and over, there were 114.2 males.

The median income for a household in the village was $44,167, and the median income for a family was $68,750. Males had a median income of $44,896 versus $22,500 for females. The per capita income for the village was $21,818. About 8.2% of families and 14.2% of the population were below the poverty line, including 13.0% of those under age 18 and 12.7% of those age 65 or over.

== Notable people ==
- Darren Bailey, Illinois state senator and Republican gubernatorial nominee
- Albert Paine (1861–1937), author and biographer

== See also ==
- List of municipalities in Illinois
