= Lake Rossignol =

Lake in Nova Scotia, Canada

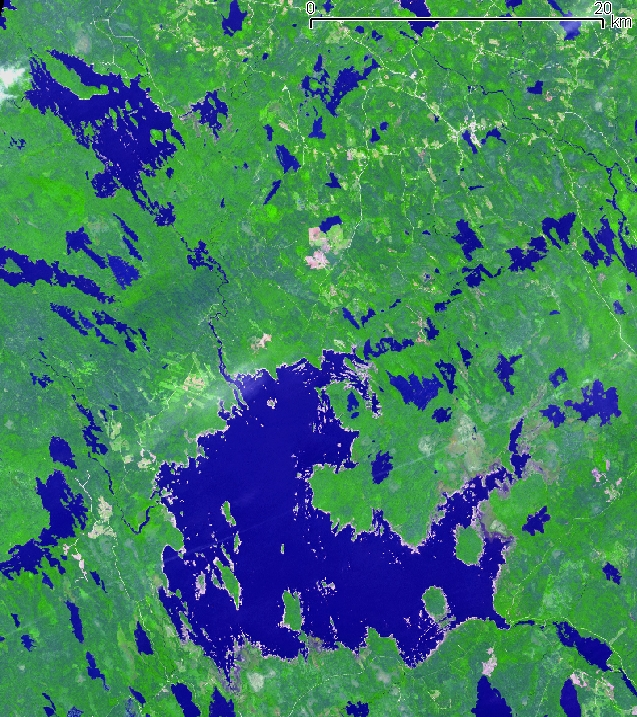
- Satellite imagery showing inland southwestern Nova Scotia with Lake Rossignol visible in the bottom half.

- Location within Nova Scotia
- Location: Queens County, Nova Scotia
- Coordinates: 44°10′47″N 65°07′33″W
- Basin countries: Canada

Lake Rossignol is a freshwater lake in Nova Scotia, Canada. At more than 32 kilometers in length, Rossignol is the largest freshwater lake in the province. It is located in Nova Scotia's southwestern interior, in Queens County.

== History ==
Historically, Lake Rossignol (also formerly known as Third Lake) was much smaller than it is today. The lake has been significant to the Mi'kmaq for thousands of years, with known archeological sites associated with it. In the 19th and early 20th Centuries, the many lakes and large areas of wilderness in southwestern Nova Scotia, including the area around Lake Rossignol, were popular destinations for recreational hunting and sport fishing expeditions.

In 1929, the Bowater Mersey Paper Company Limited dammed the Mersey River at Indian Gardens, causing more than a dozen smaller lakes (including the original Lake Rossignol) to conglomerate into the major reservoir that it is today. The purpose of this damming activity was to generate electricity for a pulp mill 30 km (19 mi) downstream in Brooklyn. Former lakes affected by the damming, and thus are now part of modern Lake Rossignol's footprint, include First Lake, Second Lake, Third Lake (Lake Rossignol), Fourth Lake, Fifth Lake, Yeadon Lake, Davis Lake, Kempton Lake, Low Lake, Menchan Lake, Lacey Lake, and Annis Lake.

== Geography ==
The size of the lake can allow strong winds to build up fetch, combined with numerous submerged trees and rocks as well as a variable water level (due to fluctuations in water demand at the dam), this can make Rossignol extremely dangerous for canoes and small boats.

== Tourism ==
Several canoe guides are available that cover Rossignol and the surrounding area.

== See also ==
- List of lakes of Nova Scotia
