= Albert Paine =

American author and biographer

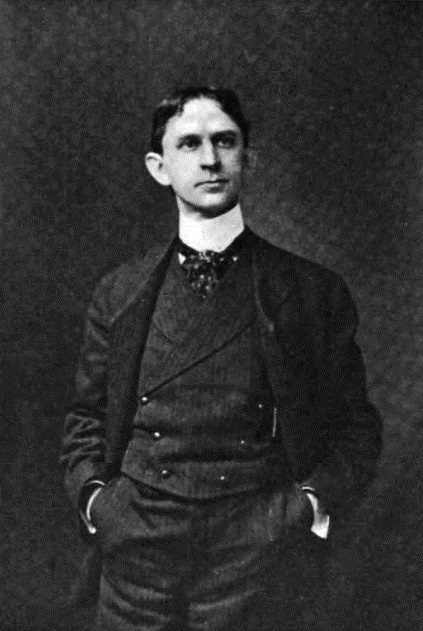
Albert Paine

Albert Bigelow Paine (July 10, 1861 – April 9, 1937) was an American author and biographer best known for his work with Mark Twain. Paine was a member of the Pulitzer Prize Committee and wrote in several genres, including fiction, humor, and verse.

== Biography ==
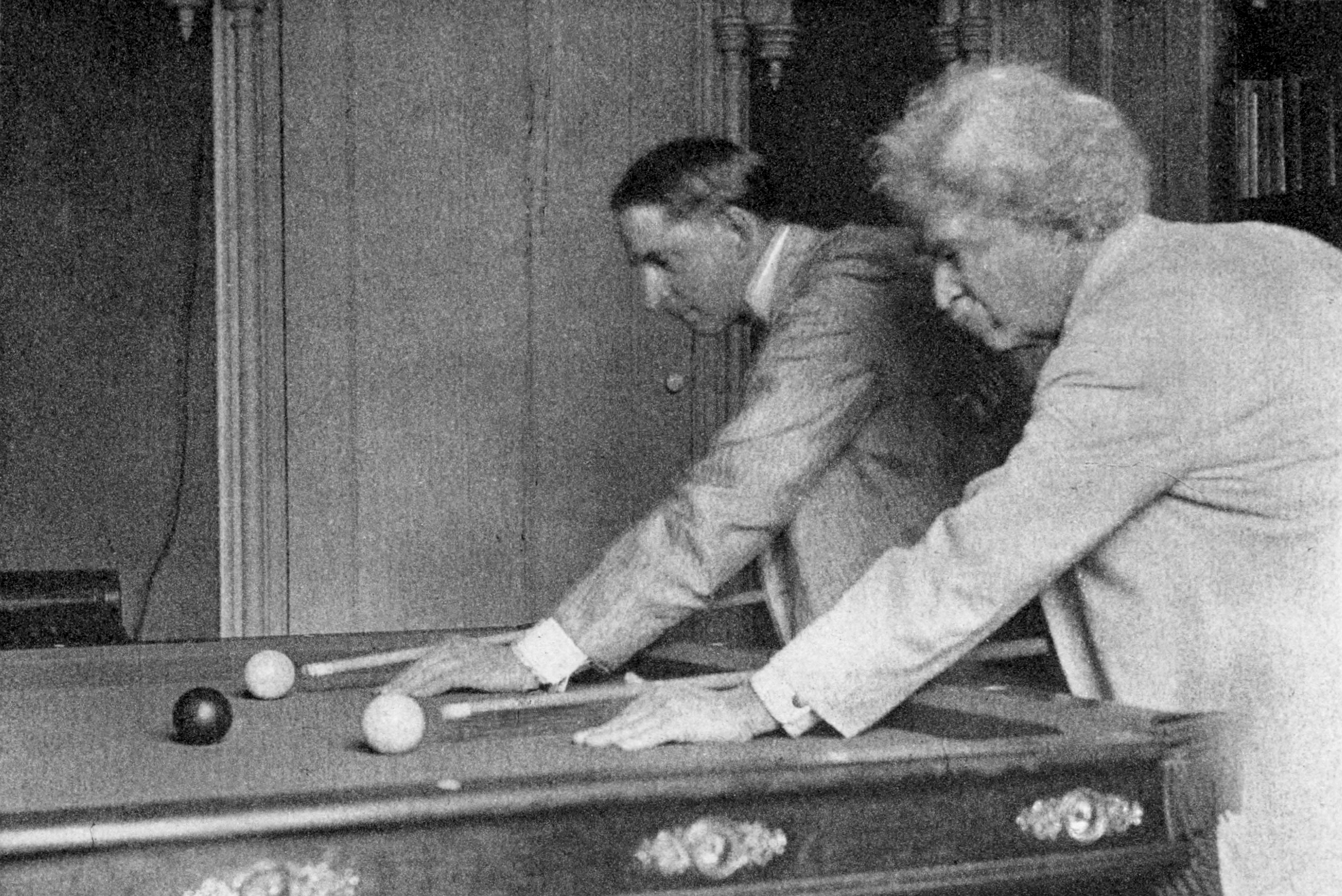
Paine and Mark Twain playing billiards at Twain's New York City residence (1907)

Paine was born in New Bedford, Massachusetts, the son of Vermont farmer Samuel Estabrook Paine and Massachusetts shopkeeper Mercy Coval Kirby Paine, and was moved to Bentonsport, Iowa when he was one year old. From early childhood until early adulthood, Paine lived in the village of Xenia in southern Illinois; here he received his schooling. His home in Xenia is still standing. At the age of 20, he moved to St. Louis, where he trained as a photographer, and became a dealer in photographic supplies in Fort Scott, Kansas. Paine sold out in 1895 to become a full-time writer, moving to New York. He spent most of his life in Europe, including France, where he wrote two books about Joan of Arc. The works were so well received in France that he was awarded the title of Chevalier in the Légion d'honneur by the French government.

Albert and Dora Paine had three daughters. Max McCoy in his "Biographer Obscura: The Secret Life of Albert Bigelow Paine" (in Mark Twain Journal Vol. 56, No. 1 [Spring 2018], pp. 249–267) claims Paine was earlier married to Minnie Schultz, and he either lied or committed bigamy by marrying Dora while still married to his first wife.

== Selected bibliography ==
Books about Mark Twain

- Mark Twain's Autobiography: With An Introduction by Albert Bigelow Paine – Volume I public domain audiobook at LibriVox
- Mark Twain: A Biography, 4 volumes (1912) LCCN 2021-772125
- The Boy's Life of Mark Twain (1916)
- The Boys Life of Mark Twain public domain audiobook at LibriVox
- Mark Twain's Letters, 2 volumes (editor, 1917)
- A Short Life of Mark Twain (1920)
- Mark Twain's Speeches (editor, 1923)

Other biographies

- Th. Nast: His Period And His Pictures (1904)
- Captain Bill McDonald, Texas Ranger: A Story of Frontier Reform (1909)
- Joan of Arc, Maid of France (1925)
- The Girl in White Armor: The Story of Joan of Arc (1927)
- Theodore N. Vail: A Biography (1929)
- Life and Lillian Gish (1932)
- George Fisher Baker, a biography: With illustrations (1938)

Children's books

- The Arkansaw Bear Series
  - The Arkansaw Bear (1898)
  - Elsie and the Arkansaw Bear (1909)
- The Hollow Tree Series (illustrated by J. M. Condé):
  - The Hollow Tree and Deep Woods Book (1898)
  - The Hollow Tree Snowed-In Book (1901)
  - Hollow Tree Nights and Days (1915)
- Other children's books
  - Gobolinks, or Shadow-Pictures for Young and Old (1896)
  - Golden Cat (1934)

Novels

- The Mystery of Evelin Delorme, A Hypnotic Story (1894)
- The Bread Line (1900)
- The Great White Way (1901)

Travel books

- The Van Dwellers: A Strenuous Quest for a Home (1901)
- The Tent Dwellers (1908)
- The Ship Dwellers (1910)
- The Car That Went Abroad (1921)

Other books

- Rhymes by Two Friends with William Allen White (1893)
- A Little Garden Calendar (1905)
- Dwellers in Arcady: The Story of an Abandoned Farm illustrated by Thomas Fogarty (1919)
- Peanut, The Story of a Boy (1913)
