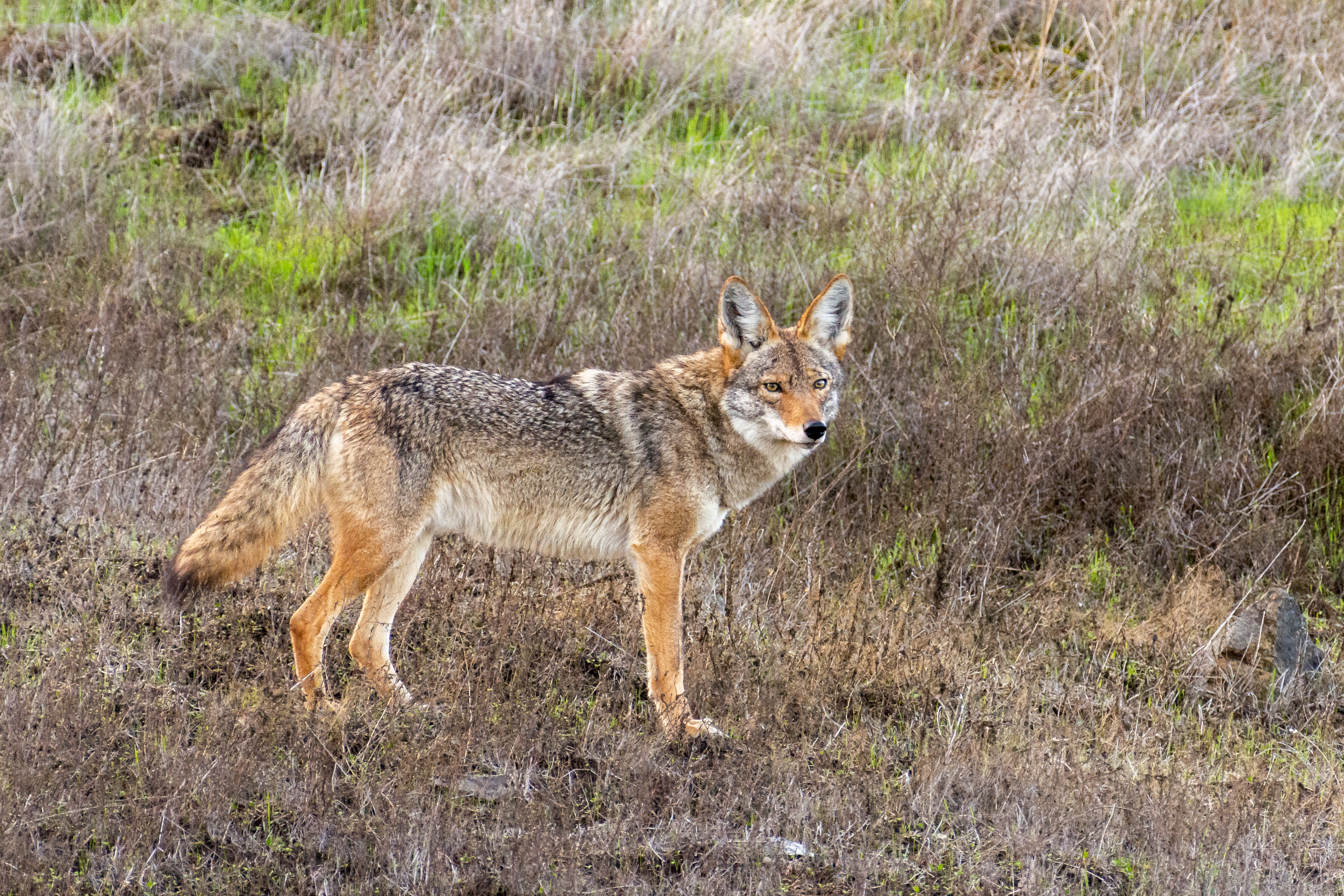
- Valley coyote at Santa Teresa County Park in 2019

Scientific classification
- Kingdom: Animalia
- Phylum: Chordata
- Class: Mammalia
- Order: Carnivora
- Family: Canidae
- Genus: Canis
- Species: C. latrans
- Subspecies: C. l. ochropus

Trinomial name
- Canis latrans ochropus (von Eschscholtz, 1829)

Synonyms
- Canis ochropus ochropus von Eschscholtz, 1829

= Valley coyote =

Subspecies of mammal

The valley coyote (Canis latrans ochropus), also known as the ochraceous-footed coyote, San Joaquin Valley coyote, or California valley coyote, is a subspecies of coyote endemic to the environs of the San Joaquin Valley in California. Their population occurs in California west of the Sierra Nevada, except in the northern section.

== Taxonomy ==
The valley coyote was first described in 1829 by Johann Friedrich von Eschscholtz. It was the second subspecies of coyote to be named behind the plains coyote.

The specific name "ochropus" is derived from Ancient Greek okhros, "ocher", and pous, "foot", hence the alternative name ochraceous-footed coyote. Other names for the valley coyote include the San Joaquin Valley coyote and California Valley coyote.

=== Evolution ===
The valley coyote is most likely to be the direct descendant of the Pleistocene coyote, since the type specimen of the Pleistocene coyote shares a few, slight differences from the valley coyote. In addition, most Pleistocene coyote finds have been found in Southern California, where modern valley coyotes can be found.

== Range and distribution ==
The valley coyote is found to the west of the Sierra Nevada mountain range and is commonly found throughout the foothills and valleys near that area.

== Attacks on humans ==
As is with other coyote subspecies, valley coyotes seldom attack humans and such cases are extremely rare.

In October 1981, three-year-old Kelly Keen was grabbed and dragged across the road by an urban valley coyote in her father's driveway. While the coyote was chased away by her father, she succumbed to a broken neck and blood loss. This is one of two fatal coyote attacks on humans which have been confirmed by experts.
