= The Pinnacle (Cape Breton) =

Mountain in Nova Scotia, Canada

- Location within Nova Scotia Location within Canada

Highest point
- Elevation: 530 m (1,740 ft)
- Prominence: 71 m (233 ft)
- Coordinates: 46°41′02″N 60°46′22″W

Geography
- Location: Inverness County, Nova Scotia, Canada
- Parent range: Cape Breton Highlands
- Topo map: NTS 11K10 Chéticamp River

Climbing
- Easiest route: Hike

The Pinnacle is a Canadian peak in the Cape Breton Highlands, with an elevation of 530 metres (1,740 ft). The Pinnacle is the second highest elevation point in the province of Nova Scotia, and the highest in Inverness County, Nova Scotia.

The Pinnacle is located within the Cape Breton Highlands National Park. The Pinnacle is part of the Cape Breton Highlands plateau and is located 20 kilometres (12 mi) east of Chéticamp, and 29 kilometres (18 mi) west of Ingonish, Cape Breton Island. Its nearest neighbour, of almost the same height, is the Bakeapple Barren Northeast, which lies just 5 kilometres (3.1 mi) to the east. The Pinnacle is only 13.4 kilometres (8.3 mi) from White Hill, the highest point in Nova Scotia, further off to the east.

This peak is the highpoint of Rocky Barren, which lies at the headwaters of the MacKenzies and Chéticamp rivers on Cape Breton Highlands.

== Hiking ==
The nearest access point is a seasonal gravel road that leads to Fishing Cove Lake to the northwest.
