= Bakeapple Barren Northeast =

Mountain in Cape Breton Island, Nova Scotia, Canada

- Location within Nova Scotia Location within Canada

Highest point
- Elevation: 526 m (1,726 ft)
- Coordinates: 46°41′38″N 60°41′19″W

Geography
- Location: Inverness County, Nova Scotia, Canada
- Parent range: Cape Breton Highlands
- Topo map: NTS 11K10 Chéticamp River

Climbing
- Easiest route: Hike

Bakeapple Barren Northeast is a Canadian peak in the Cape Breton Highlands of Cape Breton Island, and is the third highest elevation point in the province of Nova Scotia, the second highest in Inverness County, Nova Scotia, after The Pinnacle (Cape Breton).

Located on the Cape Breton Highlands plateau, 25 kilometres (16 mi) northeast of Chéticamp, and 24 kilometres (15 mi) northwest of Ingonish, the peak is situated in the Cape Breton Highlands National Park and is accessible only by hiking. It is a remote, flat hill, rising from a marshy, barren, windswept upland about 11 kilometres (6.8 mi) from the nearest road and 10 kilometres (6.2 mi) from any maintained hiking trails.

Bakeapple Barren Northeast rises to the north of Bakeapple Barren proper, attaining an elevation of 526 metres (1,726 ft). Its nearest higher neighbour, The Pinnacle, lies just 5 kilometres (3.1 mi) to the west.
