= Skyline Trail (Cape Breton Highlands National Park) =

Hiking trail in Nova Scotia, Canada

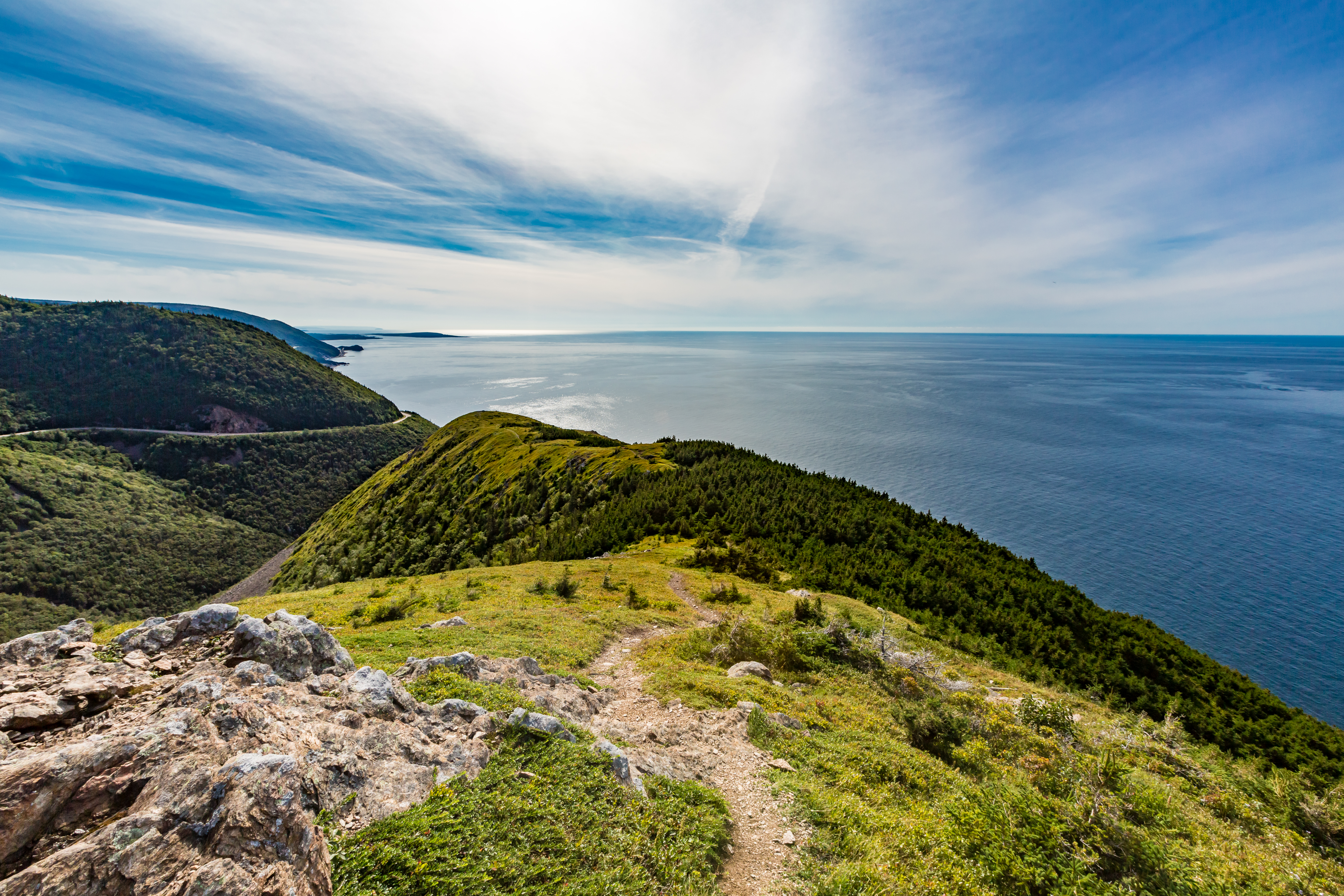
- Skyline Trail, with French Mountain on the left, and the Gulf of St. Lawrence to the right
- Interactive map of Skyline Trail
- Elevation: 455 m (1,493 ft)

Location
- Location: Cape Breton Highlands National Park
- Range: Appalachian Mountains
- Coordinates: 46°44′31″N 60°52′52″W

The Skyline Trail is a seven-kilometre, looping, hiking trail at Cape Breton Highlands National Park in Nova Scotia, Canada. It lies on the western side of the Cabot Trail, near French Mountain's summit. This trail is well known for its scenic views, but also for the 2009 fatal coyote assault on Taylor Mitchell. The trail’s busy hours are from 11am to 3pm, so it’s best to do the hike before or after these hours. A Park Pass and Parking Permit are required to do the hike as it is in the Cape Breton Highlands National Park. No dogs are permitted on the trail.

It consists of a loop that at about halfway leads to a boardwalk. The first half of the loop is very well maintained and virtually wheelchair accessible. The second half of the loop is an easy hiking trail over stony ground and meadows. The boardwalk at the middle of the trail consists of 275 steps and provides views of the Cabot Trail and the ocean. There are multiple interpretive panels along the trail. Moose as well as black bears have been spotted by hikers along this trail numerous times. Northern gannets fly over this trail's coast near while minke whales, harbour seals, humpback whales, harp seals, fin whales, white-sided dolphins, sei whales, harbour porpoises, grey seals, and pilot whales swim offshore.

== Taylor Mitchell coyote attack ==
On October 27, 2009, the first ever documented adult fatality by coyotes occurred on this hiking trail, fatally injuring Canada's young country folk singer Taylor Mitchell while hiking the trail alone. This serious event occurred six minutes after another hiker photographed two brazen coyotes. Taylor was taken to Sacred Heart Community Health Centre in Chéticamp and then airlifted by a helicopter ambulance to Halifax's Queen Elizabeth II Health Sciences Centre, where she died after midnight from extreme blood loss and her injuries. The resource managers of Cape Breton National Park and the Nova Scotia Department of Natural Resource's Wildlife manager confirmed via DNA tests that the offending coyotes were killed within the next six days. An earlier non-fatal attack occurred on July 14, 2003, when a seventeen-year-old American girl was bitten multiple times while hiking with her parents.

=== Aftermath ===
Park's Canada, NSERC, and several other academic collaborators funded a five-year research project to better understand contributing factors to this extreme coyote behaviour. Warning signs were posted at the entrance of all hiking trails to educate visitors how to respond when in coyote habitat. A coyote bit a sixteen-year-old girl on the top of her head twice on August 9, 2010. She was camping with her parents on the eastern end of the park in Ingonish. The teenage girl was taken to a hospital for stitches and treatment to prevent rabies.

== Restoration of the boreal forest ==
In 2015, conservationists built two hectare enclosures on the trail when Parks Canada began its project of restoring the park's boreal forest. Over fifty-seven thousand trees have been planted in and around this exclosure to keep moose from consuming the growing trees.
