= Wreck Cove Hydroelectric System =

Hydroelectric Generating System in northern Nova Scotia, Canada

- Location within Nova Scotia Location within Canada
- Country: Canada
- Location: Wreck Cove, Municipality of the County of Victoria, Nova Scotia
- Coordinates: 46.65218°N 60.66425°W
- Purpose: Power
- Status: Operational
- Construction began: 1975
- Opening date: 27 March 1978
- Owner: Emera
- Operator: Nova Scotia Power

Dam and spillways
- Type of dam: 12 major gravity dams: D-1 through D-11, plus South Lake Dam, along with associated wing dams
- Height: The tallest D-7 McMillian at 51 metres (167 ft)
- Length: The longest D-1 Chéticamp at 1,075 metres (3,527 ft)

Reservoir
- Catchment area: 216 square kilometres (83 sq mi)
- Surface area: Combined area of 18 square kilometres (6.9 sq mi)

Hydroelectric Plants
- Coordinates: 46.531317°N 60.440333°W
- Type: Conventional
- Hydraulic head: 365 m (1,197.51 ft)
- Turbines: 1 at Gisborne Generating Station and 2 x 106 MW francis turbines at Wreck Cove Generating Station
- Installed capacity: 215.8 MW
- Annual generation: 318 GWh (1,140 TJ)
- Website www.nspower.ca

Wreck Cove is the largest hydroelectric system in Nova Scotia with a generating capacity of 215.8 MW. Constructed from 1975 to 1978, south of the Cape Breton Highlands National Park, Wreck Cove collects drainage water from 216 square kilometres (83 sq mi) of the Cape Breton Highlands plateau to generate renewable electricity. It consists of two generating stations: the Gisborne Generating Station, with an installed capacity of 3.5 MW, and the Wreck Cove Generating Station, with an installed capacity of 212 MW, producing on average 318 GWh annually—enough energy to power about 30,000 homes.

There are 33 hydro stations across Nova Scotia, with a total capacity of 400 MW. Wreck Cove makes up half of that hydro capacity, making it a significant provider of renewable energy that complements the 600 MW of less-predictable wind power on the province's electrical system. The Wreck Cove hydroelectric facility is the only one in the province that can go from zero to full output in under 10 minutes.

== Purpose ==
Wreck Cove primary purpose is to generate electricity, to supply Nova Scotia Powers' electrical grid, but the unique nature of the installation also allows Wreck Cove to play a critical role in NS Power's ability to meet the reliability standards defined by North American Electric Reliability Corporation (NERC) and Northeast Power Coordinating Council (NPCC) and also provides other Grid Reliability Services:

=== NERC/NPCC requirements ===
==== Black Start Requirements ====
Under NERC, Nova Scotia Power must maintain multiple black start pathways to restart the grid should a black-out ever occur. Wreck Cove is one of the two pathways Nova Scotia Power uses to meet this NERC requirement.

==== Planning Reserve Margin ====
Nova Scotia Power must maintain sufficient capacity to serve its peak load as well as additional capacity for the planning reserve margin (PRM). The PRM acts as a resource to respond to a contingency to ensure customer load can be served in the event unexpected generation restrictions or supply requirements arise. For example, the PRM capacity ensures adequate generation in the event that one or more generation resources are unavailable or cannot run at full capacity at the time of system peak. Planning reserves also account for uncertainties in demand forecasting and resource availability. The Wreck Cove system contributes approximately 8 percent towards NS Power's total required capacity in 2020, assuming a PRM of 20 percent.

==== Operating Reserve Capacity Requirements (10 min reserve) ====
NERC/NPCC requires electric utilities to have their largest single energy production source covered by an alternative source in reserve capacity. Currently, NS Power's largest single unit is Point Aconi Generating Station which produces 168 MW of operating capacity. Wreck Cove Units 1 and 2 have an accredited capability of 106 MW each unit (212 MW total), making this facility an important provider of this service. As such, the reliable operation of the Wreck Cove Generating Station provides Nova Scotia Power's ability to meet this requirement. NPCC also requires that operating reserve capacity be available and on the grid within 10 minutes. If Wreck Cove's Units 1 and 2 are off-line, they can be brought onto the grid and reach full capacity within the 10-minute requirement.

==== Tie-Line Regulation ====
Wreck Cove assists with providing tie-line regulation. Nova Scotia Power is required to have reserve capacity available for changes in demand across the tie-line to New Brunswick. Because Wreck Cove is capable of changing its output at the rate of 20 MW/min, it is more effective in responding to fluctuations in Nova Scotia system load and wind generation than slower acting thermal generation sources, which can be moved at a rate of 0.5 MW to 2 MW per minute.

=== Energy Balancing and Wind Following ===
Wreck Cove 1 has been utilized in recent years as a means of balancing energy generation throughout the cycles associated with wind generation. Nova Scotia Power's hydroelectric generation provides load/wind following services, meaning that the hydroelectric generation is dispatchable and can be used to mitigate the impacts resulting from the high variability of wind generation resources and associated forecasting variations. Although wind following was not the original intent for the use of Wreck Cove, having the ability to utilize Wreck Cove in this way has supported the development and integration of wind generation on the grid. This service is related to the Tie-Line Regulation discussed above, but over a longer time frame. The flexibility of Wreck Cove's load response is also critical to managing periods of short term, large scale load changes (pickup and drop-off) from industrial customers on the grid.

=== Grid Reliability Services ===
==== Load Shaving Capacity ====
Wreck Cove provides critical peak load shaving capacity for the short periods of high load that occur daily, typically during morning and evening peak hours. Given Wreck Cove can be brought on-line quickly for these periods of high load ramping, thermal generation resources which cannot be cycled off-and-on frequently can be more economically dispatched.

==== Scheduling and Dispatch ====
Wreck Cove is a source of 212 MW of stored power for Nova Scotia Power to use when needed. It can operate at maximum power for 4–6 hours depending on conditions, at which time it needs to allow water from farther upstream in the watershed to make its way to Surge Lake.

==== Reactive Supply and Voltage Control ====
Nova Scotia Power's 33 hydro plants/50 hydro units provide 180 MVar of dynamic reactive power to the system. The Nova Scotia Power System Operator controls generators to absorb or produce reactive power to control system voltage. Wreck Cove is located at the eastern end of the transmission grid and therefore its ability to support load is less important than generation closer to the load centre; however, due to its relative size, its dynamic reactive power contributes to stabilizing the grid following disturbances.

==== Primary Frequency Response ====
Wreck Cove, like all hydro and thermal generators, is equipped with speed governors which maintain the scheduled grid frequency of 60 Hz. It provides a significant contribution to system inertia, which stabilizes the grid frequency during disturbances.

==== System Strength ====
Hydro generation contributes to system inertia, which allows the system to ride through fault conditions, and short circuit strength, which provides the high fault current levels needed to activate system protection devices (inverter-based wind, tidal and solar do not materially contribute to this).

== History ==
=== Planning ===
The project land were owned by the Province, with the exception of the 26 square kilometres (10 sq mi) Chéticamp Lake area which was owned by the federal government and formed part of the Cape Breton Highlands National Park. At the request of the Province, the latter was removed from the Park in 1958 when planning for the project first began. Since that time these lands have been managed by the Department of Indian and Northern Affairs as federal crown lands but were not subject to the National Parks Act.

The Nova Scotia Power Corporation (NSPC) recommenced planning for the project in 1974. At that time the Minister of Indian and Northern Affairs agreed in principle to an exchange of the Chéticamp Lake lands for those of an equivalent natural value elsewhere in the Province, on the condition that there should be no adverse effects from the project or the National Park. In late 1974 a private consultant prepared a preliminary environmental evaluation of the project's probable effects. Following a review of this evaluation a resolution was passed by the Nova Scotia Legislature in January 1975 indicating that the project was to proceed, and "that a phased environmental assessment be undertaken to minimize potential adverse effects". In March 1975, Nova Scotia Minister of the Environment, Mr. Bagnell, joined with Mme Sauve, the federal Minister of the Environment, in calling for a new assessment of the project's environmental effects with particular emphasis on the segment involving the Chéticamp River system. Details of the agreement were contained in a March 1975 joint Canada-Nova Scotia press release. The Nova Scotia Department of the Environment was to be responsible for the coordination of the assessment and the NSPC was to produce the Environmental Impact Statement (EIS) under joint guidelines approved by the federal and Nova Scotia Departments of Environment. Both Environment Departments were to co-chair a public meeting on completion of the EIS. The federal government chose the Environmental Assessment and Review Process (EARP) as the federal review mechanism. All Panel members came from the Department of the Environment with the exception of one member from Parks Canada.

A series of public meeting and public consultations were held in Baddeck, Halifax, and Sydney. The Final Environmental Impact Statement was produced by the Nova Scotia Power Corporation and distributed in May, 1977. Following review, the Nova Scotia Department of the Environment found that all provincial environmental concerns had been adequately dealt with.

In the end the Panel concluded that the Chéticamp portion of the Wreck Cove hydroelectric project may be constructed and operated with acceptable environmental impact provided the recommendations advanced in their report were implemented.

=== Construction ===
Between 1975 and 1978, more than 2.5 million cubic metres of rock were blasted and removed to construct the facility's 11 major dams and associated wing dams. All are earth dams or rockfill dams with an impervious material in the middle (the core dam), with filter material at both sides and rockfill on each dam for stability.

The development involved the diversion of seven headwater streams, including Indian Brook, West Indian Brook and MacMillan's Brook, Wreck Cove River, MacLeod's Brook, the Ingonish River and the headwaters of Chéticamp River. Several large lakes were formed, Wreck Cove Flowage, Gisbourne, MacMillan Lake, Chéticamp Lake, all linked by canals and tunnels, guiding the water to Surge Lake at the head of the penstock, where it drops to the underground powerhouse and then follows the tailrace tunnel to the sea. It required one of the largest fleets of earth-moving equipment in Nova Scotia's history and employed approximately 900 people.

The Wreck Cove Hydro Station produced its first energy on 27 March 1978.

== Technical characteristics ==
=== Dams, Wing Dams, Spillways, and Canals ===
There are 21 dams of various heights and lengths holding back the several reservoirs that make up the Wreck Cove Hydroelectric System:

Dam or other Structure	Height (ft.)	Length (ft.)	Canal Area (m2)	Reservoir Area (m2)
D-1 Chéticamp Flowage and Spillway	49	3,525	22,978	6,079,538
D-2 Ingonish I and Spillway	34	1,090	-	295,904
D-3 Ingonish II and Spillway	47	1,973	-	688,609
D-4 South Gisborne and Spillway	92.5	2,810	-	3,578,111
D-5 East Gisborne	43	1,395	-	1,663,338
D-6-1 McLeod Brook	72	1,609	-	2,785,124
D-6-2 McLeod Brook	10	1,200	-	386,823
D-7 McMillian Flowage and Spillway	170	1,995	35,434	N/A
D-8-1 Wreck Cove Lakes	30	2,412	-	257,481
D-8-2 Wreck Cove Lakes	11.2	857	-	96,126
D-8-3 Wreck Cove Lakes	9.8	983	-	84,111
D-8-4 Wreck Cove Lakes	20	1,166	-	171,654
D-8-5 Wreck Cove Lakes	30.8	1,536	-	264,347
D-8-6 Wreck Cove Lakes	22	620	-	188,820
D-8-7 Wreck Cove Lakes	9.8	341	-	84,111
D-9 Wreck Cove Brook and Spillway	51.8	861	-	444,584
D-10 Long Lake	33.1	1,170	-	284,088
D-11-1 Surge Lake	76.1	611	-	206,992
D-11-2 Surge Lake	44	1,594	-	119,680
D-11-3 Surge Lake	17.1	145	-	46,512
South Lake Dam and Spillway	12.1	292	-	199,183

Water moves from Chéticamp Flowage (El. 464 metres (1,522 ft)), via canal C-1, to Ingonish I (El. 437.4 metres (1,435 ft)), then canal C-2 to Ingonish II (El. 436 metres (1,430 ft)) reservoirs, and on to canal C-3 which discharges into Gisborne Flowage (El. 390 metres (1,280 ft)). Here is it joined with water from MacMillan Flowage (El. 404 metres (1,325 ft)) via tunnel T1, a 4,877 metres (16,001 ft) long, 2.5 metres (8.2 ft) diameter tunnel, to Gisborne, where electricity is generated through the Gisborne Powerhouse's horizontal turbo generator unit. The water then follows canals C-5 & 6 to the Wreck Cove Flowage Reservoir (El. 365.8 metres (1,200 ft)), and then travels via T2, a 610 metres (2,000 ft) long 3.65 metres (12.0 ft) diameter inverted siphon tunnel, to the head pond, Surge Lake. A blasted, concrete lined penstock, 4.15 metres (13.6 ft) in diameter, then carries water down 365 metres (1,198 ft) to the power house below.

=== Power House ===
The Wreck Cove station's powerhouse is located 275 metres (902 ft) underground, accessible down a 620 metres (2,030 ft) access tunnel. The powerhouse, which was carved out of the granite of the mountain, is 51.8 metres (170 ft) long, 18.3 metres (60 ft) wide, and 28.7 metres (94 ft) high (from the base of the valve wells to the roof). The bottom of the valve wells are 3.5 metres (11 ft) below sea level, the centreline of the turbines are at an elevation of .3 metres (0.98 ft) above sea level. The main floor of the power house is at 9 metres (30 ft), with the cavern's roof arch rising to 25.2 metres (83 ft) above sea level.

At the base of the power house, the concrete lined penstock transitions into a bifurcation and steel lined horizontal penstock, 45.7 metres (150 ft) long. These now paired penstocks deliver the high pressure water to the two 2 metres (6.6 ft) diameter spherical turbine inlet shutoff valves (Dominion Engineering Works) that feed into Wreck Cove's two vertical 101 MW francis turbine (Mitsubishi Motors) generator units (Canadian General Electric).

The water then is carried to the tailrace, which is another 1,705 metres (5,594 ft) tunnel approximately 6.7 metres (22 ft) wide. The slope of the tailrace is very low, about 1 metre (3.3 ft) in 300 metres (980 ft) (a 0.028% downslope). The top of the tailrace at the sea is always above high tide though the base is at 3.6 metres (12 ft) below sea level. All in all, water will have travelled as much as 30 km from the Chéticamp Flowage to the tailrace's outlet at the sea.

The Wreck Cove plant design is creative; hydro turbines frequently rely on large water volume and flow rates to operate. In this case, the series of dams on the plateau 365 metres (1,198 ft) above the powerhouse provide a supply of very high pressure water to the hydro turbines for electricity generation, requiring less flow for the same output due to the high pressure differential. Wreck Cove takes advantage of the Cape Breton Highland's natural topography to provide cost-effective, clean electricity.

== Tours ==
Tours of the facility have been given in the past, they are now rare occurrences. Quoting Paul Breski, the superintendent of Wreck Cove Hydro on visitor's reaction to the underground power house:

"The biggest 'wow' factor is really when they walk into the power house for the first time," he said. "We have a ceramic floor and 30-metre ceiling and a huge overhead crane. It literally looks like a James Bond villain's lair."

== Refurbishment ==
Wreck Cove underwent a $13.5 million refurbishment in 2015–16, the first major work to take place there since its construction. This work included some of the reservoirs and dams, with a $5.8-million refurbishment to ensure updated national dam guidelines were met. Crews striped away the riprap, which is a man-made barrier of rocks that protects the dam, and doubled its thickness to six feet to ensure it can withstand large waves that could be generated in a severe storm. The project also involved raising the dam by 1 metre (3.3 ft). The refurbishment is expected to extend the life of the dam by 70 years.

== Modernisation ==
In February 2020, Nova Scotia Power Inc. applied for approval from the provincial regulator, the Nova Scotia Utility and Review Board (UARB), for a $110-million life extension and modernization (LEM) of the hydroelectric facility.

The work is being carried out in a two-phase project. The first phase of the project, now complete, included replacing the two Wreck Cove generator units; refurbishing the two turbine units, including replacing the turbine runners; refurbishing the spherical valves; and upgrading the penstock intake at Surge Lake. The LEM project will increase the flexible operating range of the units and it is estimated it will increase Wreck Cove system annual generation from 300 GWh to a forecast 315 GWh.

The second phase will primarily involve the rehabilitation of the station breakers and switchgear, and the replacement of the cooling water systems at the plant, as well as plant system upgrades. Nova Scotia Power said most of the gear and systems it will replace are either at the end at the useful lives, obsolete, degraded or do not meet current operational requirements. Much of the equipment slated for replacement is original to the nearly 45-year-old power plant. The UARB approved the project, with approval of the second phase granted in June 2021.

The objective of the LEM initiative is to enable the Wreck Cove Generating station to continue to provide renewable generation and system stability for the next 40 years. The Wreck Cove facility is critical for meeting Nova Scotia Power's environmental emissions caps and renewable energy targets.

== See also ==
- Wreck Cove Hydro Tour (video) 1:18 - July 2018
- Wreck Cove 101 (Nova Scotia Power) (video) 3:09 - June 2022
- Fielding Road to Wreck Cove Hydro Station, a road trip from Margaree via the Highland road system (with photos)
