= Chéticamp Flowage =

Lake in Nova Scotia, Canada

- Location within Nova Scotia
- Location: Victoria County, Nova Scotia
- Coordinates: 46.650°N 60.635°W
- Basin countries: Canada

Chéticamp Flowage is a reservoir of Victoria County, in north-eastern Nova Scotia, Canada. It was created when the Nova Scotia Power Corporation placed the D-1 Dam across the Chéticamp River about 3 kilometres (1.9 mi) west of Chéticamp Lake as part of the construction of the Wreck Cove Hydroelectric System.

Winds can be strong over this flowage, making canoeing difficult. Despite this, fishing is a popular activity here.

== See also ==
- List of lakes in Nova Scotia
