= McMillan Flowage =

Lake in Nova Scotia, Canada

- Location within Nova Scotia
- Location: Victoria County, Nova Scotia
- Coordinates: 46°31′14″N 60°39′2″W
- Basin countries: Canada

McMillan Flowage is a lake of Victoria County, in north-eastern Nova Scotia, Canada. It was created when the Nova Scotia Power Corporation constructed the Wreck Cove Hydro Electric Station and placed D-7 Dam across Indian Brook.

== See also ==
- List of lakes in Nova Scotia
