= White Hill (Nova Scotia) =

Hill, highest elevation point in Nova Scotia, Canada

- Location within Nova Scotia

Highest point
- Elevation: 535 m (1,755 ft)
- Prominence: 535 m (1,755 ft)
- Isolation: 151.6 km (94.2 mi)
- Listing: Canada most isolated peaks 39th; Canadian Subnational High Points 12th
- Coordinates: 46°42′00″N 60°36′00″W

Geography
- Location: Victoria County, Nova Scotia
- Parent range: Cape Breton Highlands
- Topo map: NTS 11K10 Chéticamp River

Climbing
- Easiest route: Hike

White Hill is a peak in the Cape Breton Highlands which is the highest point of elevation in Nova Scotia, Canada.

Located on the plateau 15 kilometres (9 1/2 mi) northwest of Ingonish and 33 kilometres (21 mi) northeast of Chéticamp, the peak is situated in the Cape Breton Highlands National Park and is accessible only by hiking. It is a remote, large flat hill, covered by small spruce trees rising from a marshy, barren, windswept upland about 20 kilometres (12 mi) from the nearest road and 10 kilometres (6 mi) from any maintained hiking trails.

== Survey monument ==
There is a first order Natural Resources Canada Geodetic Survey Division Station (Unique Number: 23105) on the summit, consisting of a marker, a brass/bronze disk, set in the top of a concrete pier on a small bedrock outcrop. There was a metal tower marking the site, but it was lying on the ground as of 2008. The station was surveyed and placed in June 1923 and the marker was renewed in 1963. The station was inspected by helicopter in 1976 and 1987.

== See also ==
- List of highest points of Canadian provinces and territories
