= Lone Shieling =

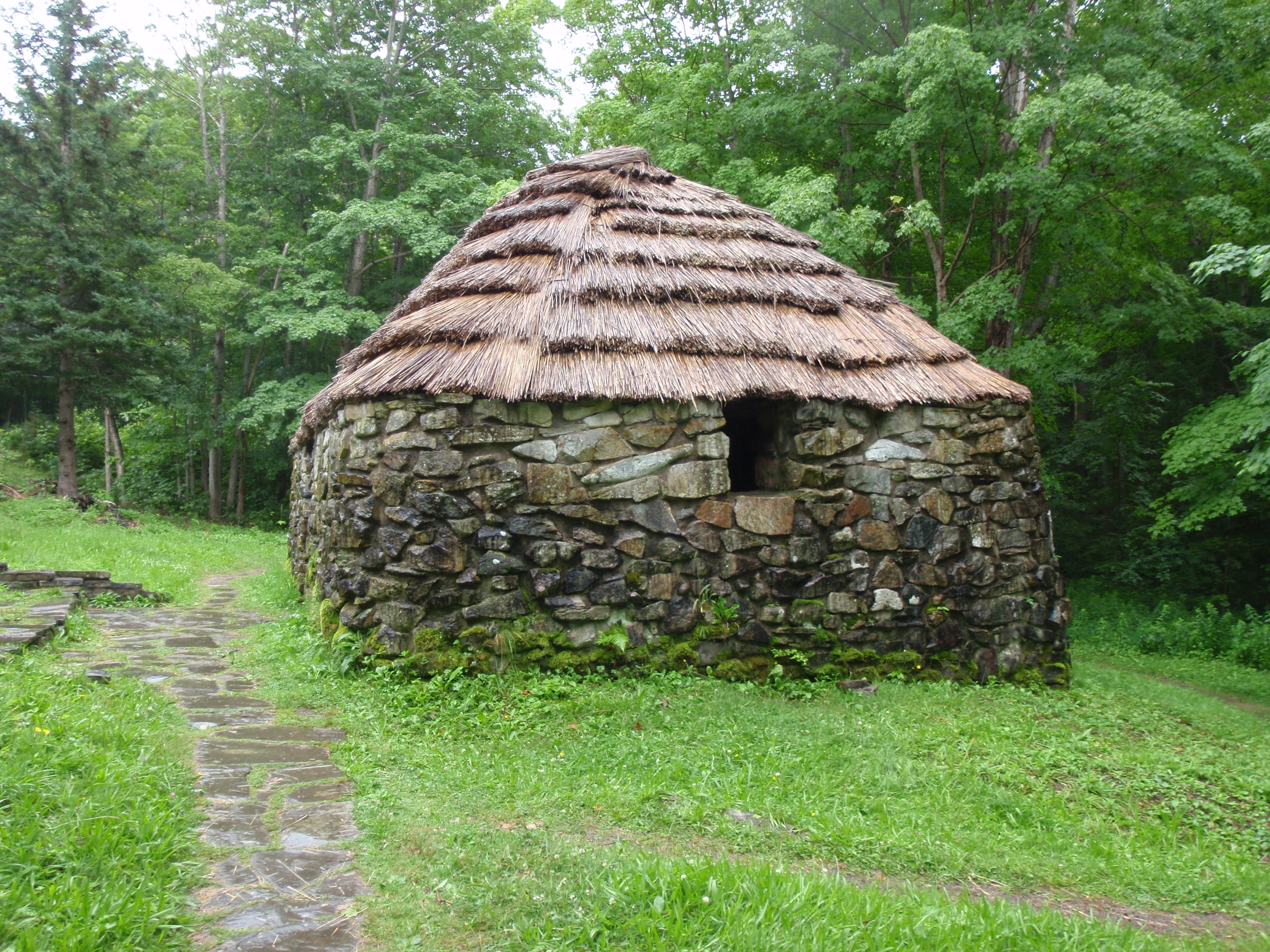
The Lone Shieling sheep crofter hut, or "bothan".

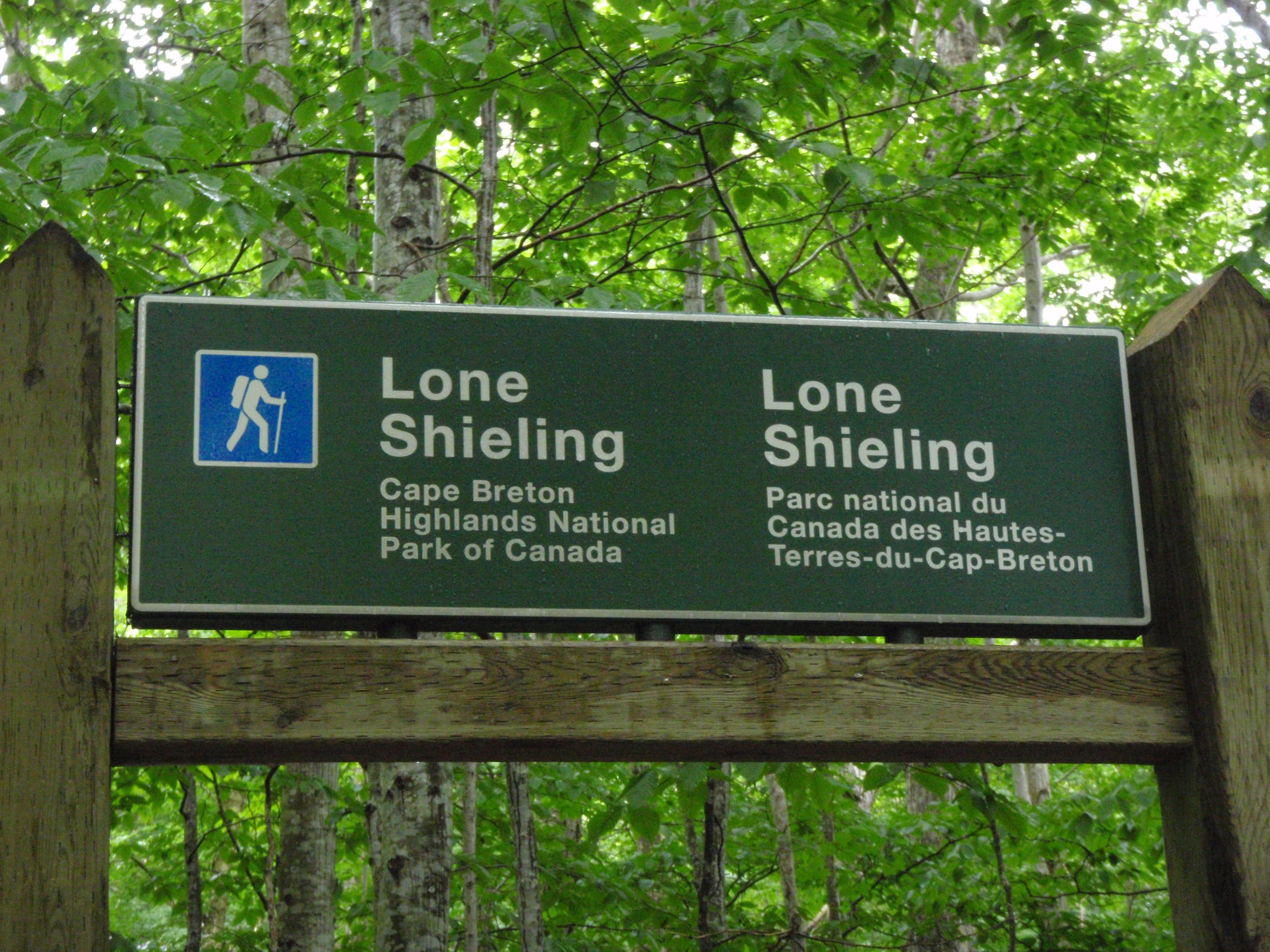
Lone Shieling trail sign.

The Lone Shieling is a Scottish-style sheep crofters hut (also known as a bothan or shieling) located in Cape Breton Highlands National Park, Nova Scotia. Built in 1942, it is one of the earliest structures in the park and is a Recognized Federal Heritage Building (ID 4627) due to its historical and architectural significance. A short trail, named for the building, leads to Lone Shieling. The building is constructed from irregular field stone with a timber and thatch roof.

== Origin ==
The construction of Lone Shieling was an expressed wish of Professor Donald S. MacIntosh, originally from Pleasant Bay, Inverness County, Nova Scotia, who willed 100 acres of land to the Province of Nova Scotia for the park upon his death in 1934. As noted on the site plaque, he asked:

... that the Government of the Province will maintain a small park at the Intervale and will build there a small cabin which will be constructed in the same design or plan as the lone shieling on the Island of Skye, Scotland.

A "lone shieling" is mentioned in the "Canadian Boat-Song" (also known as "The Lone Shieling"), an anonymous poem published in 1829 describing the experience of Scottish emigrants from the Highland Clearances who lived on Cape Breton Island. Quotations from the poem are displayed at the building, specifically:

From the lone shieling of the misty island
Mountains divide us, and the waste of seas -
Yet still the blood is strong, the heart is Highland,
And we in dreams behold the Hebrides

== Environment ==
Lone Shieling sits in one of the most protected areas of Cape Breton Highlands National Park, surrounded by "one of the largest old growth hardwood forests in the Maritimes".
