= Taylor Mitchell =

Canadian singer-songwriter (1990–2009)

- Mitchell in 2007

Background information
- Born: Taylor Josephine Stephanie Luciow; August 27, 1990; Toronto, Ontario, Canada
- Died: October 27, 2009 (aged 19) Halifax, Nova Scotia, Canada
- Genres: Folk; country
- Occupation: Singer–songwriter
- Instruments: Vocals; guitar
- Years active: 2006–2009
- Label: Back Road Tavern Productions

Taylor Josephine Stephanie Luciow (August 27, 1990 – October 27, 2009), known by her stage name Taylor Mitchell, was a Canadian country folk singer and songwriter from Toronto. Her debut and sole studio album, For Your Consideration (2009), received encouraging reviews and airplay. Following a busy summer performance schedule, which included an appearance as a young performer at the Winnipeg Folk Festival, Mitchell embarked on a tour of Eastern Canada with a newly acquired licence and car.

Mitchell died at the age of 19 of injuries and blood loss after two eastern coyotes mauled her while she was walking along Cape Breton Highlands National Park's Skyline Trail. Her death is the only known fatal coyote attack on an adult and the only known fatal coyote attack on a human ever confirmed in Canada. It shocked experts and led to a reassessment of the risk to humans from the predator behaviour of coyotes.

== Career ==
Mitchell was born with the given name Taylor Josephine Stephanie Luciow. Her parents were Emily and Ray Luciow. She grew up in the Roncesvalles neighbourhood of Toronto. Taylor became interested in performing by her mid teens, and after graduating from the Etobicoke School of the Arts with a major in musical theatre, decided on a career as a singer and songwriter, taking the surname "Mitchell" as her stage name. She had released a four track EP in 2007, she independently released an album titled For Your Consideration in March 2009. In June 2009, she was invited to perform in the Winnipeg Folk Festival. Reaction from the roots music community and radio stations was positive, and she began working on new material. A contributor to the album, Justin Rutledge, later described Mitchell as having written beyond her years: "She didn’t provide answers, as so many of her age try to do. There was no preciousness about her. Instead she asked questions." To promote the album she went on a solo concert tour of the Maritime provinces, beginning on October 23, 2009. A few days before her death, Taylor was nominated for a Canadian Folk Music Award as Young Performer of the Year. Her last performance was in Lucasville, near Halifax; there were two days before her scheduled concert in Sydney.

=== For Your Consideration ===
For Your Consideration

Studio album by Taylor Mitchell
- Released: March 2009
- Genres: Folk; country
- Length: 40:40
- Label: Back Road Tavern Productions

Mitchell's debut and sole studio album, For Your Consideration, was released in March 2009. Guest musicians on the album included Justin Rutledge, Lynn Miles, Suzie Vinnick, John Dinsmore, and Michael Johnston. The album received a positive review from Exclaim!, with Eric Thom describing her as "definitively old school, if not world-weary", while Now Toronto described it as sounding "like it comes from someone of a completely different generation".

==== Track listing ====
1. "Don't Know How I Got Here" – 4:08
2. "For Your Consideration" – 3:13
3. "Clarity" – 4:18
4. "Ride Into the Sunset" – 4:14
5. "Fun While It Lasted" – 3:41
6. "Diamonds & Rust" (Joan Baez)– 4:06
7. "Trick of the Light" – 5:00
8. "Secluded Roads" – 3:51
9. "Shelter from the Storm" – 4:31
10. "Love and Maple Syrup" (Gordon Lightfoot)– 3:18

== Death ==
Having some free time before her next concert, Mitchell, an environmentalist who enjoyed nature walks, went to Cape Breton Highlands National Park on the sunny afternoon of October 27, 2009. At 14:45, a middle-aged American couple going in the opposite direction passed her near the beginning of the Skyline Trail in Petit Étang. For an unknown reason, she doubled back after going a short distance along the trail and came back down the access road intending to return to her car. It is possible a coyote was stalking her at this stage.

At 15:02, an American couple named Mike and Gayle hiked on the access road heading to the car park. They moved out of the way when two coyotes were walking toward them along the road, but going in the opposite direction. One of the hikers photographed the coyotes before heading directly to the car park. Trent University's Environmental and Life Sciences graduate program professor and Ontario Ministry of Natural Resources research scientist, Brent Patterson, later commented that the two coyotes in the male hiker's photo exhibited an extraordinary lack of fear, with one displaying what verged on a dominant attitude toward humans. It is believed these coyotes walked into Mitchell on the access road six minutes later, when Mike and Gayle heard what they thought could be either animals howling or a young woman screaming in the distance. The American middle-aged couple reported these commotions in a telephone box at the car park.

A group of four other hikers arrived in the car park, where they heard about the possible screams in the distance from the American couple. After several minutes' walk along the access road they began to find Mitchell's personal items, including keys and a small knife (believed to have been used by her in an attempt to defend herself as she was forced back up the access road and onto the Skyline Trail). As the hikers turned into the clearing at the head of the trail, they saw torn pieces of bloodied clothing and a large amount of blood along the ground. A washroom in the clearing had blood on the door.

At 15:25 they found Mitchell lying nearby among trees, with a coyote standing over her. After repeated charges by the three young men, the coyote moved away from her. She was conscious and able to speak with the rescuers. The coyote remained close by, growling and unafraid until a Royal Canadian Mounted Police officer fired a shotgun at it. Mitchell was bitten over most of her body, with particularly serious wounds to her leg and head. Paramedics took her to Sacred Heart Community Health Centre in Chéticamp, where she was then airlifted to Queen Elizabeth II Health Sciences Centre in critical condition. At the hospital, she died of blood loss. She was interred at Greenwood Cemetery in Owen Sound, Ontario.

=== Aftermath ===
There was speculation by wildlife experts that Mitchell might have initiated contact by trying to feed coyotes or by disturbing a den with young. Various other proposed explanations why the unusual attack occurred included that the coyotes might have been larger and bolder than normal coyotes because they were crosses with wolves or domestic dogs, rabid, starving, or protecting a carcass. None of these suggestions were subsequently borne out, causing a reassessment of potential risk to humans from coyote attacks. It was also thought by experts that Mitchell may have inadvertently provoked a predation behaviour by running away, though a coyote may have been behind her when she was confronted by the oncoming ones.

As is standard practice when an animal remains at large after killing a human, wardens searched for the attacker animal in the vicinity, where five or six coyotes were believed to live. Mitchell's mother issued a statement saying that her daughter would not have wanted her death to result in the extermination of the coyotes: “We take a calculated risk when spending time in nature’s fold — it’s the wildlife’s terrain,” she wrote. “When the decision had been made to kill the pack of coyotes, I clearly heard Taylor’s voice say, ‘Please don’t, this is their space.’ She wouldn’t have wanted their demise, especially as a result of her own."

Nonetheless, hours after the incident, while the trail was closed to the public, a female coyote that acted aggressively was killed by a warden keeping watch at the washhouse location. Three others within 1 kilometre (0.62 mi) of the Skyline trail were caught in leg-hold traps and killed before a large male weighing 42 pounds (19 kg) was similarly dispatched 5 kilometres (3.1 mi) away on November 14. Scientific investigation of the carcasses determined that three, including the first and last accounted for, were linked to the attack on Mitchell by her blood on their coats and other forensic evidence. The large male coyote was found to have been both the dominant lead coyote photographed on the access road and the one found standing over Mitchell; coat markings in the photographs identified its carcass, which also contained pellets from the shotgun of the Royal Canadian Mounted Police constable who fired while at the scene. The dead coyotes not linked to the attack may have been packmates of the attackers. The large male and the female may have been a breeding pair; both were related to the other attack-implicated coyote.

In mid-November 2009, a coyote came up behind a couple walking in the park approaching so closely that the man hit it on the head with a walking stick. Park conservation managers and scientists opposed a general cull on the grounds that coyotes have the ability to reproduce quickly, and culling would be likely to have no impact, or the opposite of the desired effect. This reasoning assumes that animals removed from the local gene pool by a cull would have the same propensity to fear humans as those coyotes that avoided being caught and killed. In April 2010, Nova Scotia declared a $20 bounty on coyotes, but this did not apply within the park. Visitors were asked to report encounters with coyotes. Ten months after Mitchell's death a sixteen-year-old girl who went camping with her parents at Broad Cove in Ingonish was bitten twice on the head by a coyote. A scientific study found that though usually unseen, coyotes were often in proximity to humans. Individual coyotes that are not conditioned by nonlethal aversion measures and fail to avoid humans are killed.

Bad Coyote, a documentary film centred in part on Mitchell's death and the wider issue of coyote habitat expanding into Atlantic Canada, was released in 2013.

In 2022 a study by Stan Gehrt, wildlife ecologist at The Ohio State University, was released that revealed the coyotes had been living on a diet of moose rather than their typical diet of smaller animals. It was concluded that the unavailability of smaller prey led the coyotes to become accustomed to large targets leading them to see the young woman as a potential food source.

== Taylor Mitchell Legacy Trust ==
As a memorial, Mitchell's mother established the Taylor Mitchell Legacy Trust, which has a partnership with the David Suzuki Foundation. The trust promotes community outreach for musical/creative expression as well as educating on habitat preservation, the balance between human and wildlife interaction in both natural and urban settings, and safety precautions.

== See also ==
- Kelly Keen coyote attack
- Kenton Carnegie wolf attack
