= Eastern coyote =

North American wild canine hybrid

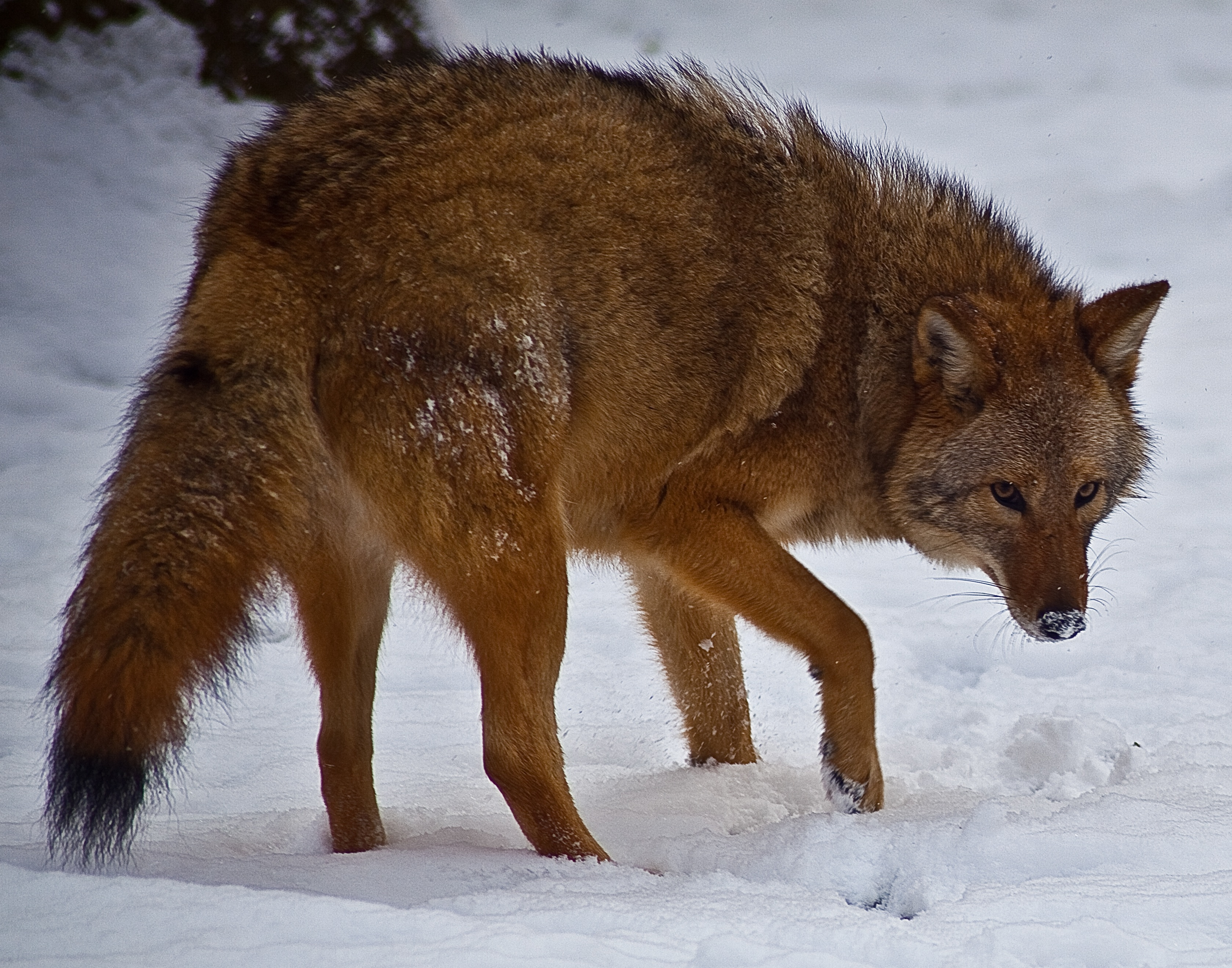
An eastern coyote in the snow near the West Virginia–Virginia state line

The eastern coyote (Саnis lаtrаns vаr.) is a wild North American canine hybrid with both coyote and wolf parentage. The hybridization likely first occurred in the Great Lakes region, as western coyotes moved east. It was first noticed during the early 1930s to the late 1940s, and likely originated in the aftermath of the extirpation of the gray wolf and eastern wolf in southeastern Ontario, Labrador and Quebec; this allowed coyotes to colonize the former wolf ranges, and mix with the remnant wolf populations. This hybrid is smaller than the eastern wolf and holds smaller territories, but is larger and holds more extensive home ranges than the typical western coyote.

== Taxonomy and evolution ==
This canine has been named Саnis lаtrаns vаr. and has been referred to as the eastern coyote, northeastern coyote, coywolf, and the southern tweed wolf. It has also been referred to as Саnis lаtrаns × lycaon.

Coyotes and wolves first hybridized in the Great Lakes region, followed by a hybrid coyote expansion that created the largest mammalian hybrid zone known. In 2014, a DNA study of northeastern coyotes showed them on average to be a hybrid of western coyote (62%), western wolf (14%), eastern wolf (13%), and domestic dog (11%) in their nuclear genome. The hybrid swarm extended into the midwestern United States, with Ohio coyotes shown on average to be a hybrid of western coyote (66%), western wolf (11%), eastern wolf (12%), and domestic dog (10%) in their nuclear genome.

For northeastern coyotes, hybridization with the dog was estimated to have occurred between 11 and 24 generations ago, and there is no evidence of recent dog-coyote crossing. There was some evidence of first and second generation wolf-coyote hybrids back-crossing with coyotes. For Ohio coyotes, the wolf DNA was present in the nuclear genome but not the mitochondrial genome, indicating hybridization between male wolves and female coyotes. For northeastern coyotes, the dog DNA was present in the nuclear genome but not the mitochondrial genome, indicating hybridization between male dogs and female coyotes. Although hundreds of northeastern coyotes showed maternal wolf DNA, nearly all were the same haplotype that indicated a past single hybridization between a female wolf and a male coyote. These findings support the hypothesis of sexual interaction based on body size, with the larger species male almost always crossing with the smaller species female.

Northeast coyotes benefit from a more diverse genome that includes genes from both wolves and dogs, which has likely allowed their adaption to both forested and human-dominated habitats. Coyotes moved into the northeast after they began to hybridize with wolves between 154 and 190 years ago. Coyotes are more genetically wolf-like in areas where a high deer density exists, supporting the theory that introgression from wolves allowed genetic adaption to this food source. There are an estimated 16–20 million white-tailed deer in the United States, and their overpopulation is estimated to cause $2 billion in damage each year, with $1 billion in automobile damage alone. Management practices should consider the ecological value of large predators in maintaining their balance.

In 2016, the IUCN/SSC Canid Specialist Group proposed the eastern coyote to be a separate species Саnis oriens (Latin for "eastern canid") and with a common name of "coywolf" due to its morphologic and genetic distinctiveness. Additionally, it has bred with other northeastern coyotes across the majority of its range, without further hybridization with any of the parent species, except for on the edges of this range. Its range includes areas where the western coyote would find it difficult to survive.

== Description ==
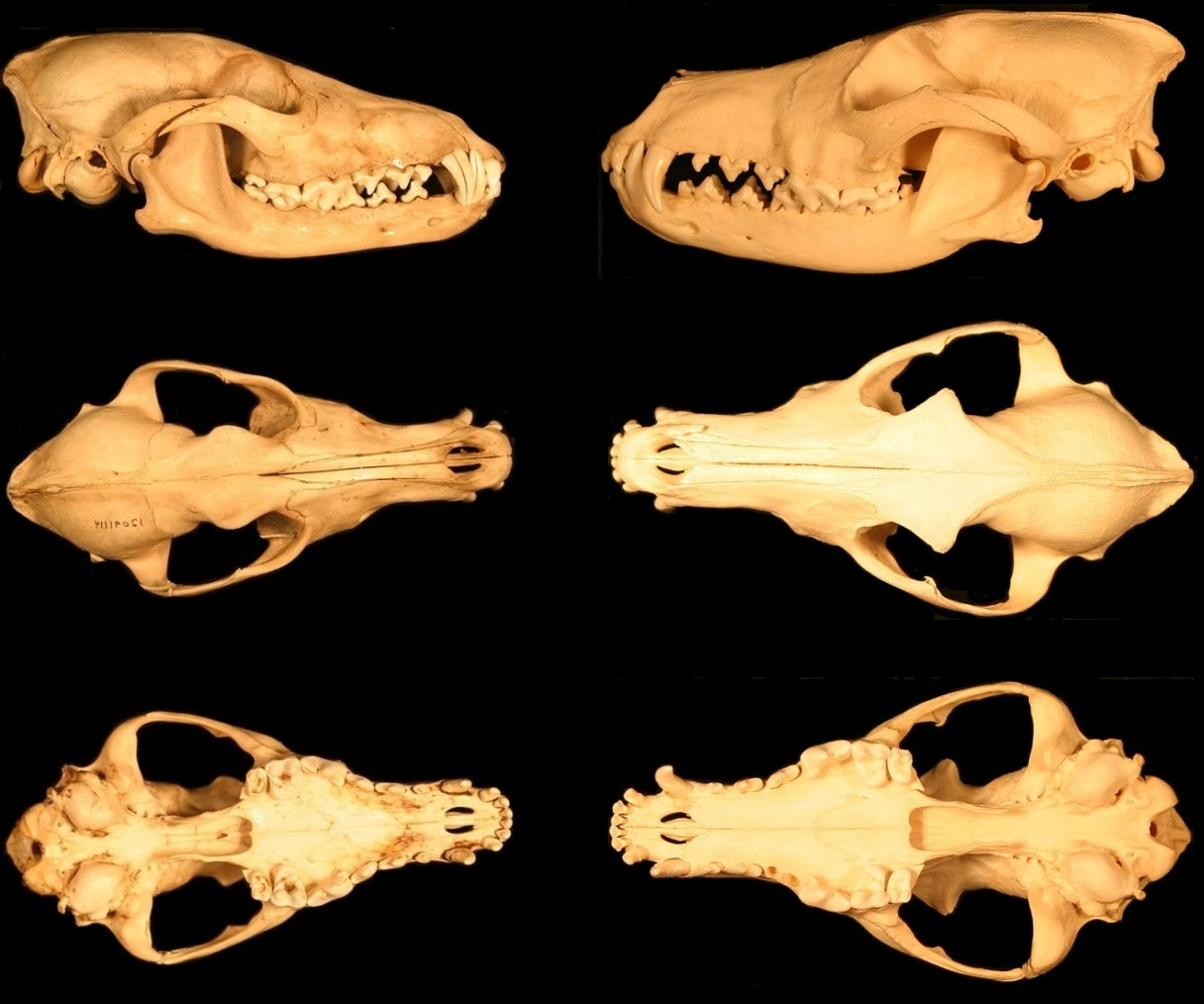
Skulls of a western coyote (left) and an eastern coyote (right).

Adult eastern coyotes are larger than western coyotes, weighing an average of 20–25 kilograms (45–55 lb), with female eastern coyotes weighing 21% more than male western coyotes. Eastern coyotes also weigh more at birth, at 349–360 grams versus 250–300 grams for western coyote pups. By 35 days of age eastern coyote pups average 1,590 grams, 200 grams more than western pups. After this, physical differences become more apparent, with eastern coyote pups displaying longer legs. Differences in dental development have also been observed, with tooth eruption beginning later and in a different order.

There are no significant differences between eastern and western coyote pups in expressions of aggression and fighting, though eastern coyotes tend to fight less and are more playful. Unlike western pups, in which fighting precedes play behavior, fighting among east pups occurs after the onset of play. Eastern coyotes tend to reach sexual maturity when they reach two years of age, much later than western coyotes.

Aside from size, both eastern and western coyotes are physically similar; each have erect ears, a straight and bushy tail, a conspicuous supracaudal gland and a narrow chest. The eastern has four color phases, ranging from dark brown to blond or reddish blond, with gray-brown the most common, and reddish legs, ears and flanks. Black colored coyotes are uncommon but have been seen.

== Distribution ==
The eastern coyote is present throughout the eastern United States: in, New York, New Jersey, Pennsylvania, Ohio, West Virginia, Maryland, Delaware, Virginia, Georgia, New England and Washington, D.C. They also range in the eastern Canadian provinces of Ontario, Quebec, New Brunswick, Nova Scotia, Prince Edward Island, and Newfoundland and Labrador.

Eastern coyote populations have recently increased in various parts of the United States, including Long Island and New York City.

== Diet ==
Eastern coyotes are opportunistic omnivores and will prey on whatever is available and easy to kill or scavenge. Though they are known to take anything from grasshoppers to moose, the Ontario Ministry of Natural Resources lists their main prey items as rabbits, hares, and deer in the winter and small mammals, wild berries, birds, amphibians, and grasshoppers in the summer.

Their diet shifts with the changing seasons. It can include, but is not limited to, insects and berries during the summer and small mammals in the fall and winter. As winter becomes harder later in the season, larger game such as the white-tailed deer become targeted. They often hunt in pairs, though deer killed by vehicles or by natural causes are more frequently scavenged. Researchers from the State University of New York College of Environmental Science and Forestry examined animal carcasses visited by radio-collared coyotes during the winter and summer of 2008–09. During the winter, only 8% of adult deer had been killed conclusively by eastern coyotes. The remaining 92% were scavenged by coyotes after being killed by vehicles or receiving other injuries. The adult deer that were taken had severe preexisting injuries, and were likely to die from other causes in the absence of coyote predation. In spring, fawns are targeted instead.

== Relationships with humans ==
=== Hunting regulations ===
In Maine, Vermont and New Hampshire, there is no bag limit for coyotes, and there is an open hunting season. The hunting regulations regarding eastern coyotes have also impacted wolves in states that border eastern wolf territory, or states that have wolf populations, because of the large size of eastern coyotes compared to western coyotes, and their genetic relations to wolves they can be mistaken for wolves and vice versa. In one instance, in 2023, a hunter in upstate New York shot a wolf mistaking it for a coyote.

=== Attacks on humans ===
As with coyotes, eastern coyote attacks are extremely rare.

In 2009, a 19-year-old Canadian folk singer, Taylor Mitchell, died after being attacked by eastern coyotes on a hike.

== See also ==
- Coywolf
- Mearns' coyote
- Northeastern coyote
- Plains coyote
- Taylor Mitchell, killed by eastern coyotes
