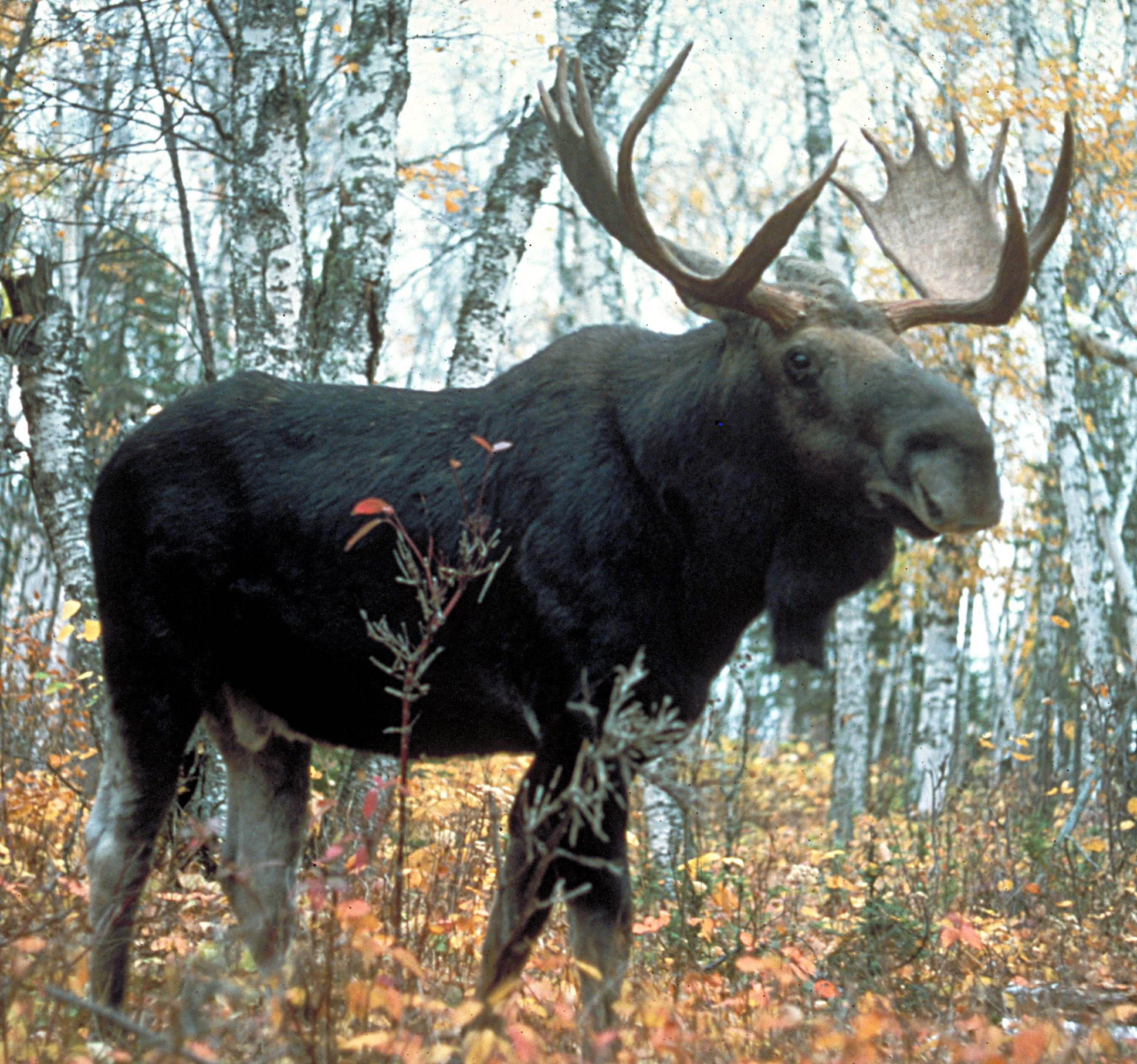

Scientific classification
- Kingdom: Animalia
- Phylum: Chordata
- Class: Mammalia
- Infraclass: Placentalia
- Order: Artiodactyla
- Family: Cervidae
- Subfamily: Capreolinae
- Genus: Alces
- Species: A. alces
- Subspecies: A. a. andersoni

Trinomial name
- Alces alces andersoni Peterson, 1952

= Western moose =

Subspecies of deer

The Western moose (Alces alces andersoni) is a subspecies of moose that inhabits boreal forests and mixed deciduous forests in the Canadian Arctic, western Canadian provinces and a few western sections of the northern United States. It is the second largest North American subspecies of moose, second to the Alaska moose. This subspecies is prey to wolves and bears. Male Western moose are aggressive during mating season (autumn and winter) and may injure or kill with provocation.

== Habitat, range, and distribution ==
The Western moose inhabits British Columbia, eastern Yukon, Northwest Territories, southwestern Nunavut, Alberta, Saskatchewan, Manitoba, western Ontario, Newfoundland and Labrador, the upper peninsula of Michigan, northern Wisconsin, northern Minnesota, and northeastern North Dakota. Additionally, Parks Canada transferred eighteen western moose from Elk Island National Park to Nova Scotia's Cape Breton Highlands National Park between 1947 and 1949 for population increase. Cape Breton Island's moose are descendants of these western moose. They were also introduced to New Zealand's Fiordland National Park.

== Diet ==
Western moose eat terrestrial vegetation such as forbs and shoots from willow and birch trees and aquatic plants, including lilies and pondweed. Western moose can consume up to 9,770 calories a day, about 32 kilograms (71 lb). The Western moose, like other species, lacks upper front teeth but instead has eight sharp incisors on its lower jaw. They also have a tough tongue, gums, and lips to help chew woody vegetation.

== Size and weight ==
Male Western moose stand anywhere from 1.9 to 2.0 metres (6.2 to 6.6 ft) at the shoulder. Their antlers span 1.5 to 1.7 metres (4.9 to 5.6 ft) and they weigh anywhere from 380–720 kilograms (840–1,590 lb). Female Western moose stand at 1.8 metres (5 ft 11 in) on average, and weigh anywhere from 270 to 360 kilograms (600 to 790 lb).

== Social structure and reproduction ==
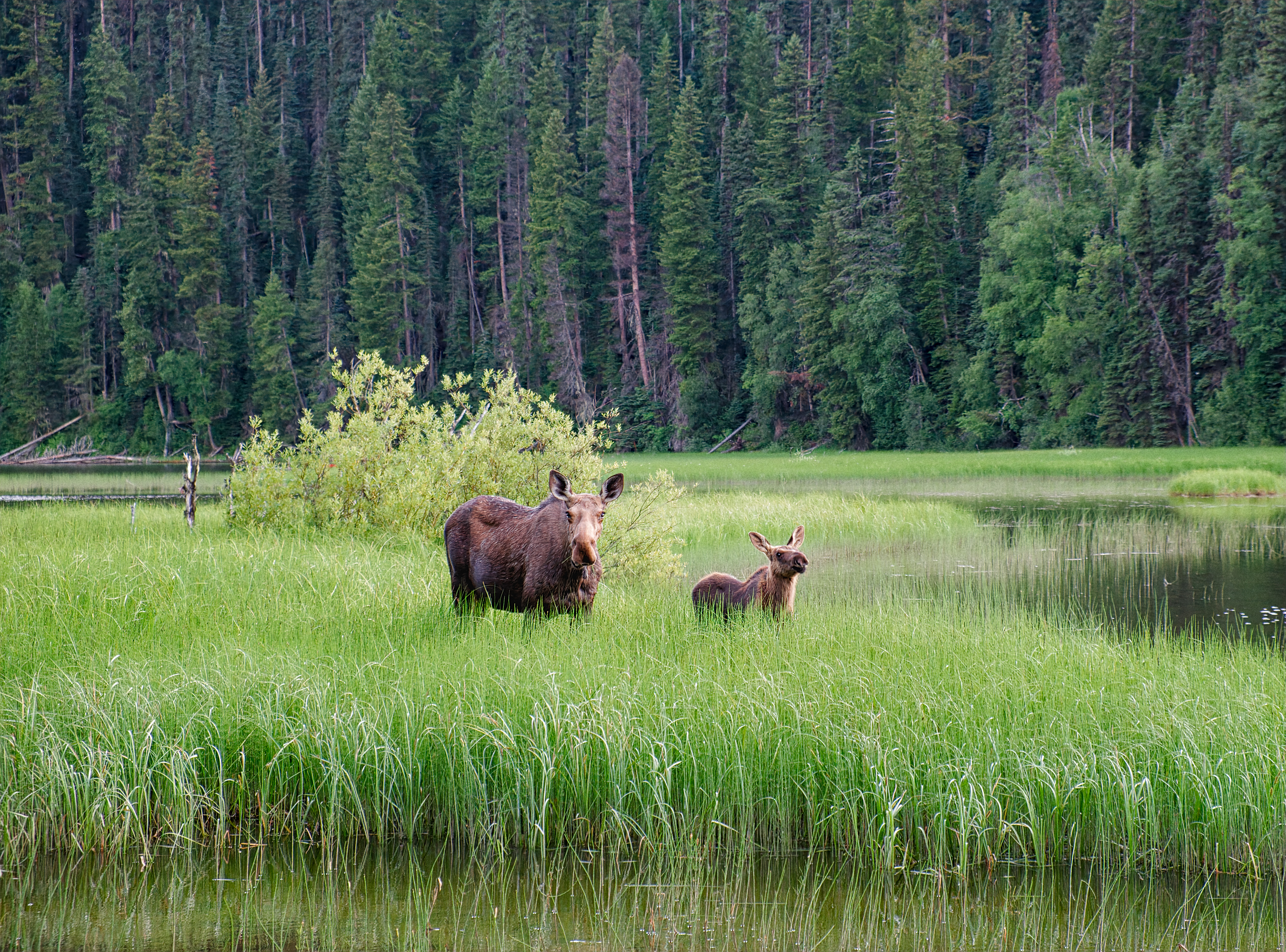
Western moose cow and calf in Bowron Lake Provincial Park

Western moose do not form social bonds and only come into contact to mate or to battle for a mate. Elevated testosterone levels during mating season mean that bulls may attack anything during mating season, including humans, coyotes, wild boars, deer, red foxes, cougars, wolf packs, Grizzly bears, elk, and black bears. They use a subtle mating call to attract females or to announce to other males that they are in the area. In the event of a fight over mating rights, bull moose risk locking their antlers, which almost always results in them both dying from starvation. Western moose females will have, on average, one or two calves at once. A female may attack if she feels that her calves are threatened, although, at around 10–11 months yearling Western moose are chased off by their mothers to fend for themselves.

== Hunting ==
With a population of about 950,000 individuals, they are hunted every autumn and winter in both Canada and the United States. Annual quotas vary depending on local population estimates and hunter success from the previous season.
