= Cape Breton Highlands National Park =

National park in Nova Scotia, Canada

- Parc national des Hautes-Terres-du-Cap-Breton
- IUCN category II (national park)
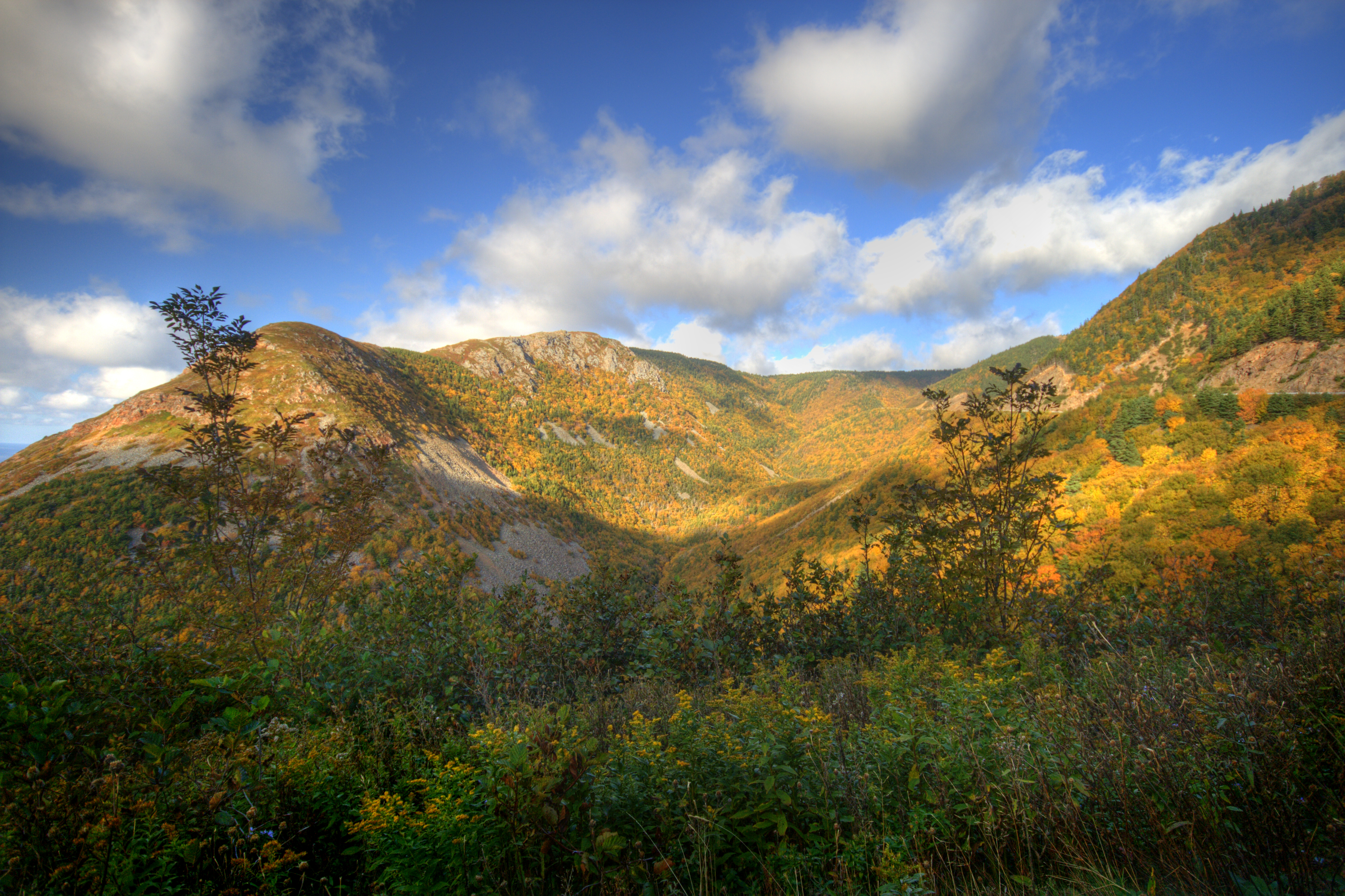
- Autumn colours in the park

- Location within Canada Location within Nova Scotia
- Interactive map of Cape Breton Highlands National Park
- Location: Ingonish, Nova Scotia, Canada
- Coordinates: 46°44′00″N 60°38′30″W
- Area: 949 km^{2} (366 sq mi)
- Established: 1936
- Visitors: 277,203 (in 2022–23)
- Governing body: Parks Canada
- Website: http://www.pc.gc.ca/en/pn-np/ns/cbreton/

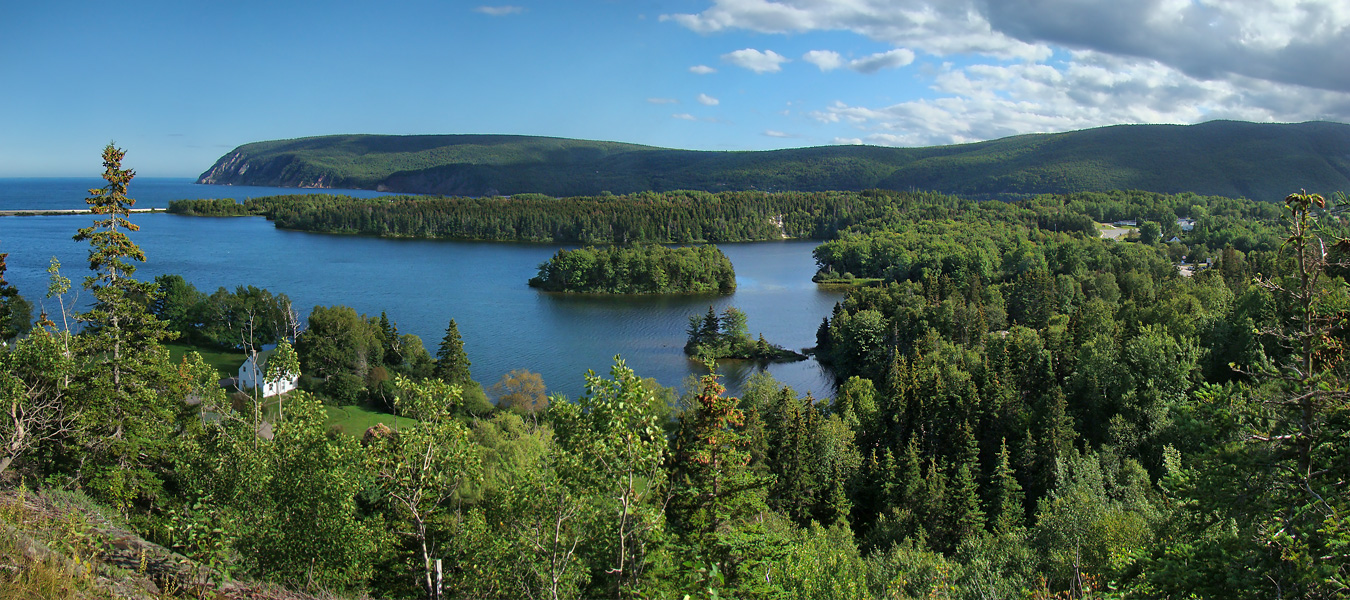
Panorama from the Freshwater Lake Lookoff

Cape Breton Highlands National Park is a Canadian national park on northern Cape Breton Island in Nova Scotia. The park was the first national park in the Atlantic provinces of Canada and covers an area of 948 square kilometres (366 mi^{2}). It is one of 42 in Canada's system of national parks.

It consists of mountains, valleys, waterfalls, rocky coastlines and the Cape Breton Highlands, a tundra-esque plateau. Forest types include Acadian and Boreal. The park includes the highest point in Nova Scotia, White Hill, at 533.5 m (1,750 ft) above sea level.

Rivers in the park include the Chéticamp River and the North Aspy River.

In 2014, Parks Canada started a four-year project with the Unama'ki Institute of Natural Resources, among other partners, to begin regional boreal forest restorations within this park.

== Recreation ==
One-third of the Cabot Trail passing through the park features ocean and mountain views. The park is known for its "steep cliffs and deep river canyons that carve into a forested plateau bordering the Atlantic Ocean".

The park contains 26 marked hiking trails, including the Skyline Trail.

At the western entrance of the park is the Acadian village of Chéticamp on the Gulf of Saint Lawrence and a park information centre. On the eastern side of the park are campsites as well as beaches at Ingonish on the Atlantic Ocean. Also on the east side of the park located in Ingonish at the Keltic Lodge resort is Highlands Links, an 18-hole golf course designed by Stanley Thompson. Golf Magazine ranked it as one of the top 100 courses in the world and the best public course in Canada. George Knudson suggested leaving clubs behind and just walking the course. The course has been certified by the Audubon Cooperative Sanctuary Program, a program aimed at conserving wildlife habitat in spaces used for other purposes.

There are five main salt water ocean beaches in the park and two freshwater lakes. The ocean beaches include Ingonish Beach, North Bay Beach, Broad Cove Beach, Black Brook Beach and La Bloc Beach. The two freshwater beaches include Freshwater Lake and Warren Lake. Freshwater Lake and Ingonish Beach are both supervised with a lifeguard during the summer months. There are very strong currents at Black Brook and Ingonish Beach which must be considered when bringing small children to these two beaches.

== Wildlife ==
Birds visible from this park include three species of hawk, two species of owl, northern gannets, kestrel, Bicknell's thrush, and the bald eagle. The first nest records of boreal owl for Nova Scotia were found in the southwestern corner of this park in 2004. This park is listed as an Important Bird Area.

Mammals include white-tailed deer, marten, lynx, muskrat, snowshoe hare, beaver, mink, bobcat, river otter, stoat, red fox, raccoon, moose, black bear, and coyote. The Gaspé shrew, the local name for a smallish variety of the long-tailed shrew, Sorex dispar, can be found on rocky slopes in the park.

After dramatic declines in the original eastern moose population on Cape Breton Island, Parks Canada transferred eighteen western moose (nine bulls, nine cows) from Alberta's Elk Island National Park to Cape Breton Highlands National Park between 1947 and 1948. Today, all moose on Cape Breton Island are descendants of the original 18 moose released into the park, which comprise a genetically distinct population (having been sourced from Alberta) from moose found nearby in mainland Nova Scotia and New Brunswick.

Aquatic life visible from this park includes North Atlantic right whales, humpback whales, fin whales, minke whales, sei whales, pilot whales, Atlantic white-sided dolphins, harbor seals, harp seals, and grey seals.

Reptiles include garter snake, red belly snake, ring-necked snake, smooth green snake, wood turtle and leatherback sea turtle.

In late October 2009, country folk singer Taylor Mitchell died as a result of her injuries and blood loss due to coyotes attacking her while she was hiking by herself on the Skyline Trail. This incident became the only recorded fatal coyote assault on an adult as well as a Canadian.

== Geology ==
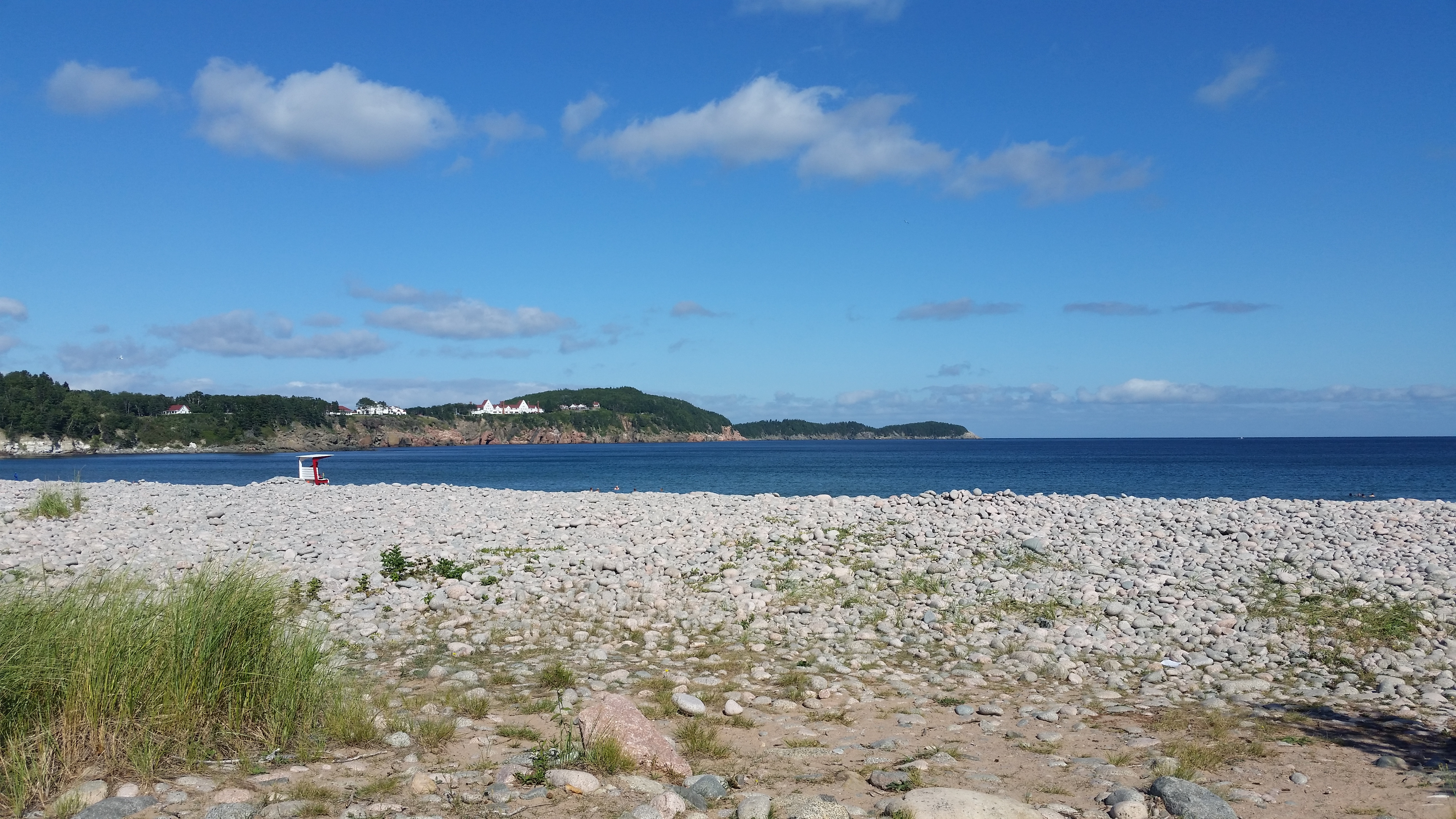
Barrier beach in front of Freshwater Lake showing well rounded boulders. Note the height above sea level.

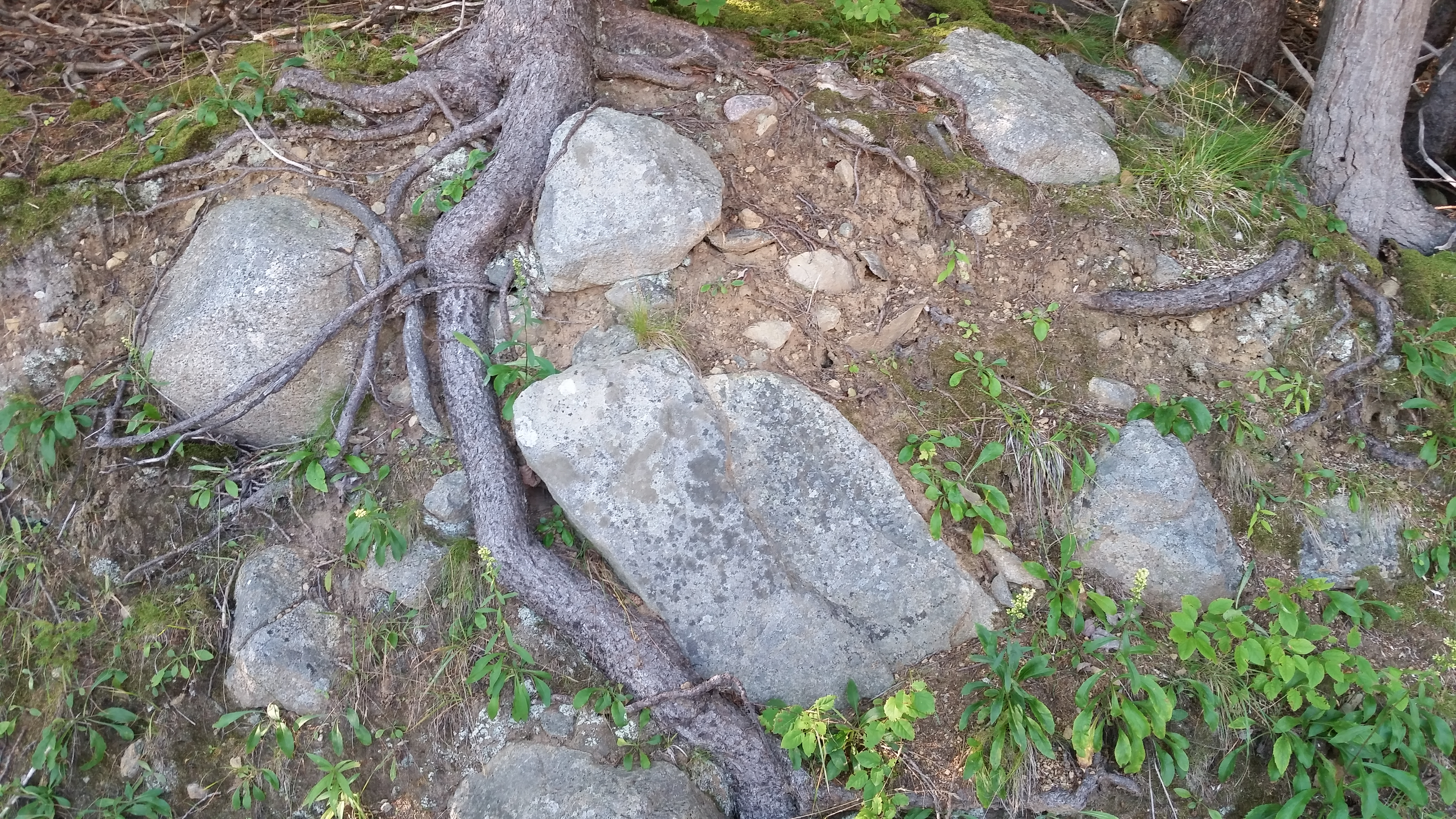
Glacial debris on the north side of Freshwater Lake.

Most of the park resides within what is called the Ganderia Terrane, sometimes referred to as the Bras d'Or or Aspy Terrane. This was originally part of Gondwana, referred to as peri-Gondwanan Terrane, and through seafloor spreading, separated from Gondwana and collided with Laurentia during the Salinic Orogeny. The evidence of this collision, the closing of the Iapetus Ocean and the formation of the Iapetus Suture, is seen in the northwest part of the park where the Ganderia Terrane is connected with the Blair River Inlier, itself a remnant of the Laurentia continental margin, referred to as peri-Laurentian Terrane. Other terrane collisions followed, including the Avalonia Terrane during the Acadian orogeny, and the Meguma Terrane during the Neoacadian Orogeny. Then, between 340 and 300 Ma, Gondwana collided with Laurentia, forming Pangea. Rifting started about 200 Ma eventually forming the Atlantic Ocean.

Along the Cabot Trail between the park headquarters at Ingonish Beach and Ingonish, a 402 Ma old Early Devonian granodiorite is exposed, the Cameron Brook Pluton, while the Keltic Lodge, on Middle Head, sits on a 493 Ma old Early Ordovician granite and a 550 Ma old Neoproterozoic diorite. The beach in front of Freshwater Lake is a classic shingle beach, a barrier beach with boulders well rounded and polished from wave action. Glacial debris is evident along the trail at the north end of the lake. A similar bar cuts across Ingonish Harbor.

A Middle to 375 Ma Late Devonian granite is seen along the Cabot Trail between Ingonish and where it leaves the park near South Harbor, while a 403 Ma Early Devonian orthogneiss is exposed at Neils Harbour northward. From Cape North, the Cabot Trail follows the Aspy Fault southwards, where the Early Carboniferous Windsor Group and Horton Group outcrops, until it reenters the park at Big Intervale. These groups of rocks consist of limestone, mudstone, anhydrite, gypsum, halite, siltstone, fluvial sandstone, shale, and conglomerate. The Windsor Group is also exposed at Ingonish and Ingonish Beach.

The Cabot Trail then doglegs to the north, crossing the Wilkie Brook Fault Zone, and entering the southernmost extent of the Blair River Inlier. The inlier is bounded by the Wilkie Brook Fault Zone on the east and the Red River Fault Zone on the southwest near Lone Shieling. The fault zones are marked by a zone of sheared rocks characterized by mylonite. Between these zones are outcrops of Silurian Fox Back Ridge diorite and granodiorite, as well as the Red River Anorthosite Suite of Middle Proterozoic age.

The Cabot Trail then follows the Grande Anse River westwards, with exposed Horton Group until it reaches the coast at Pleasant Bay. This is the location of the 364 Ma Late Devonian granite of the Pleasant Bay Pluton. Moving south along the trail, the 433 Ma Ordovician-Silurian Belle Cote Road orthogneiss is encountered, followed by another granite (Proterozoic-Devonian in age).

As the trail loops west to follow the coastline, rocks of the 439 Ma Ordovician-Silurian Jumping Brook Metamorphic Suite are exposed. This suite consists of metamorphosed siltstone, wacke, conglomerate, arkose, and minor rhyolite. In the midst of this suite may be found the 379 Ma Devonian granite of the Gillanders Mountain Pluton. The trail encounters a 439 Ma Cambrian granite before it exits the park at La Rigoueche.

== Trails ==
Cape Breton Highlands National Park offers 26 hiking trails with different difficulties. Two of them are currently under construction. They are all accessible with The Cabot Trail.

== Gallery ==
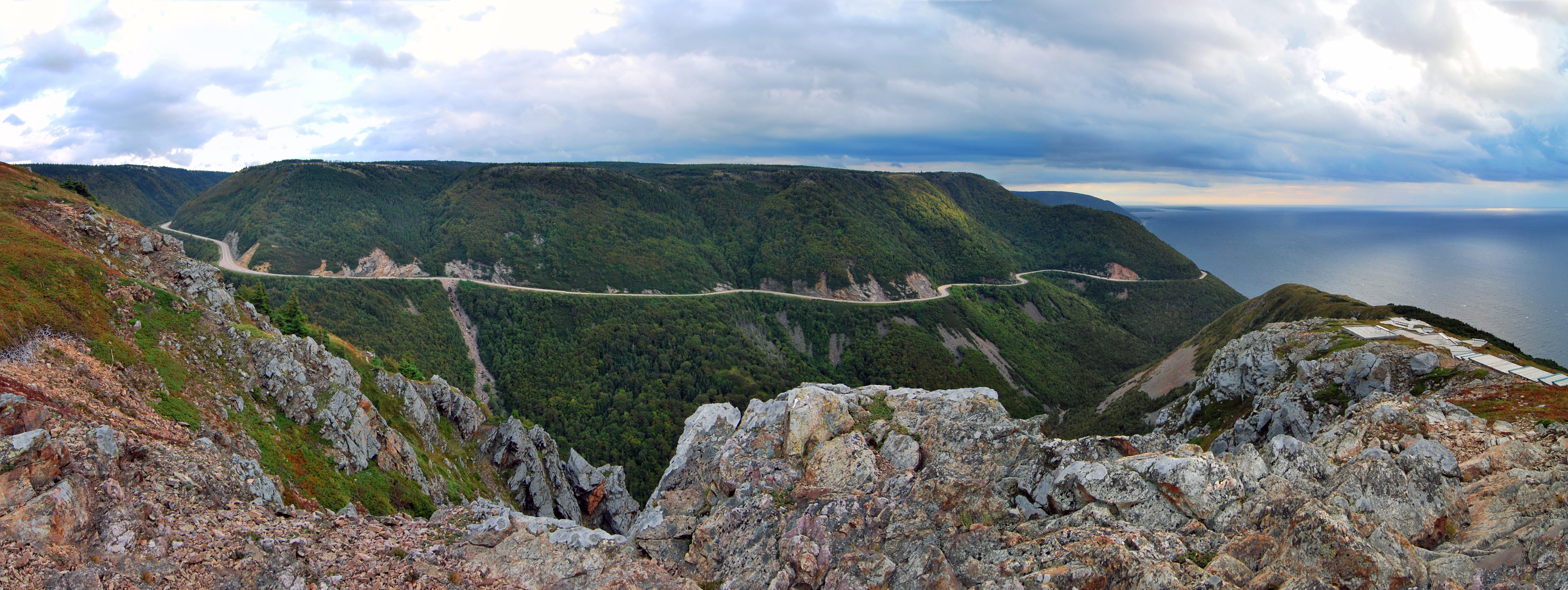
The Cabot Trail viewed from the Skyline Hiking Trail

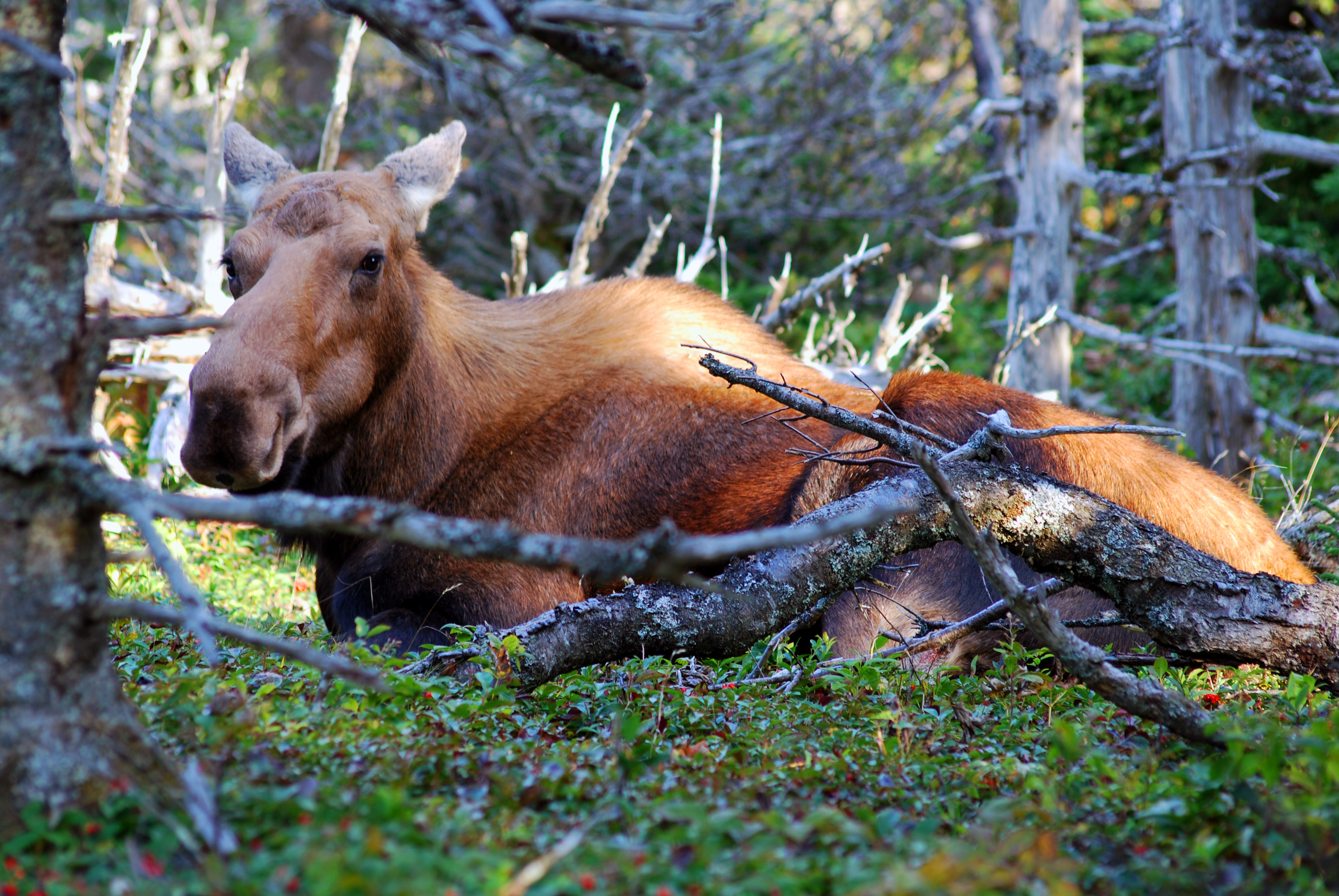
A moose resting in the park

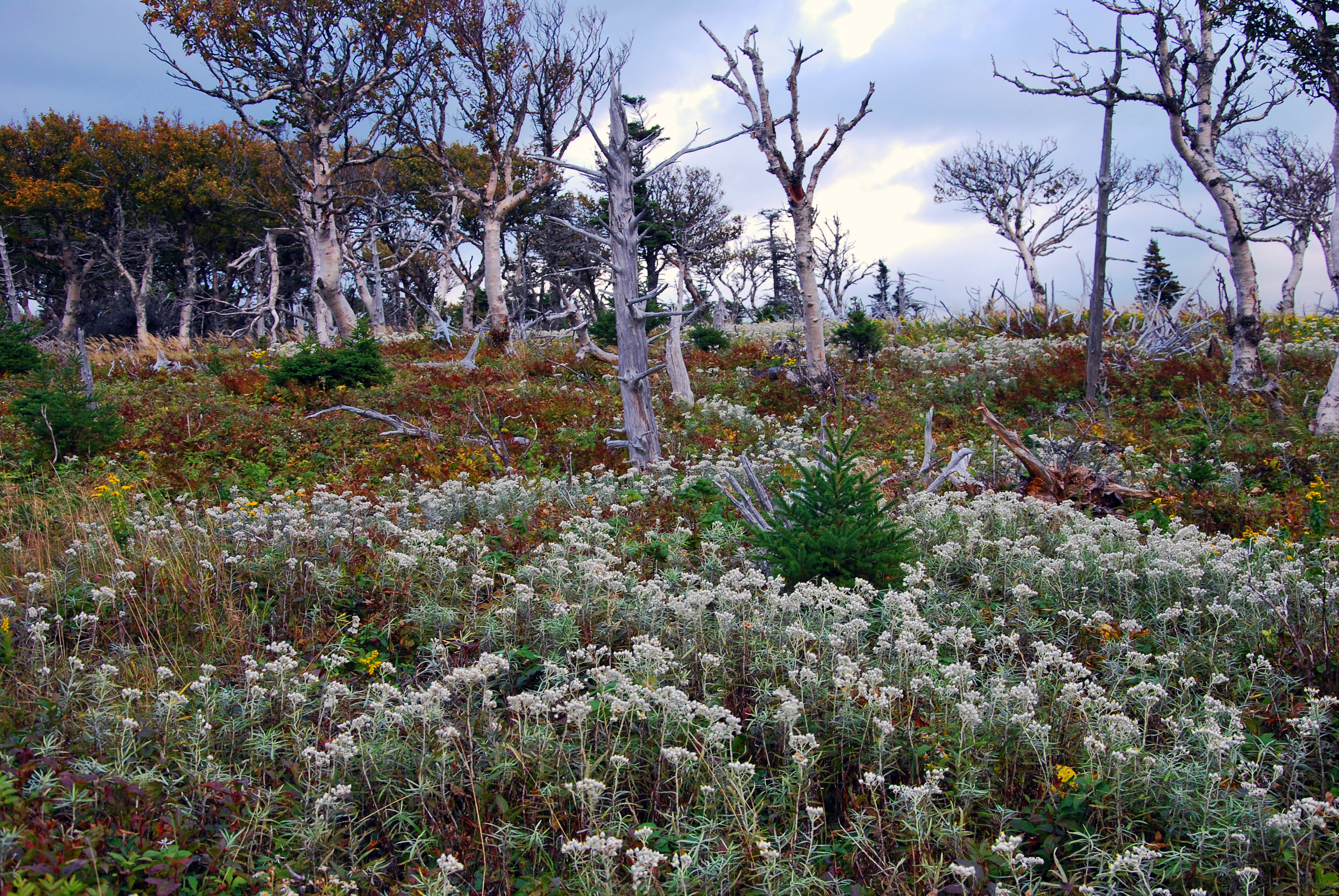
Part of the Skyline Hiking Trail

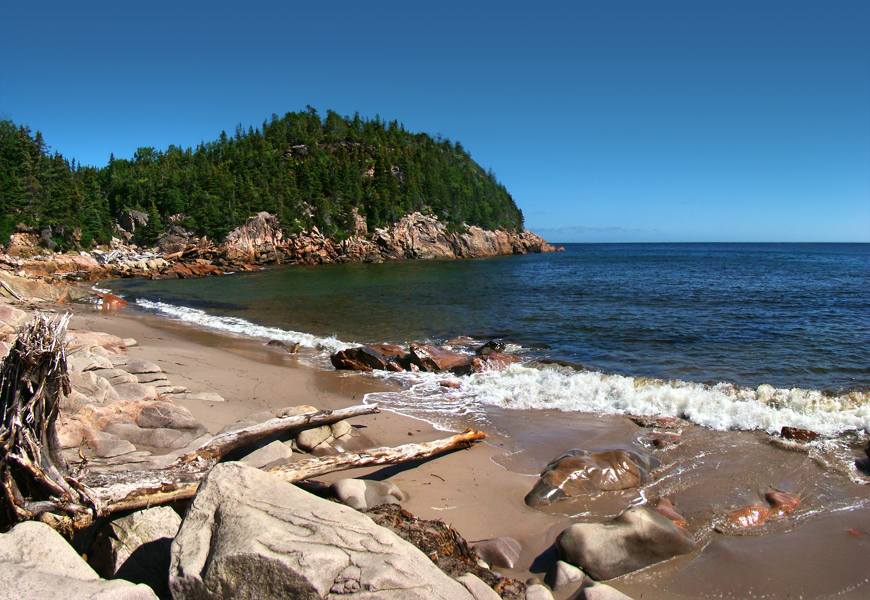
Black Brook Beach

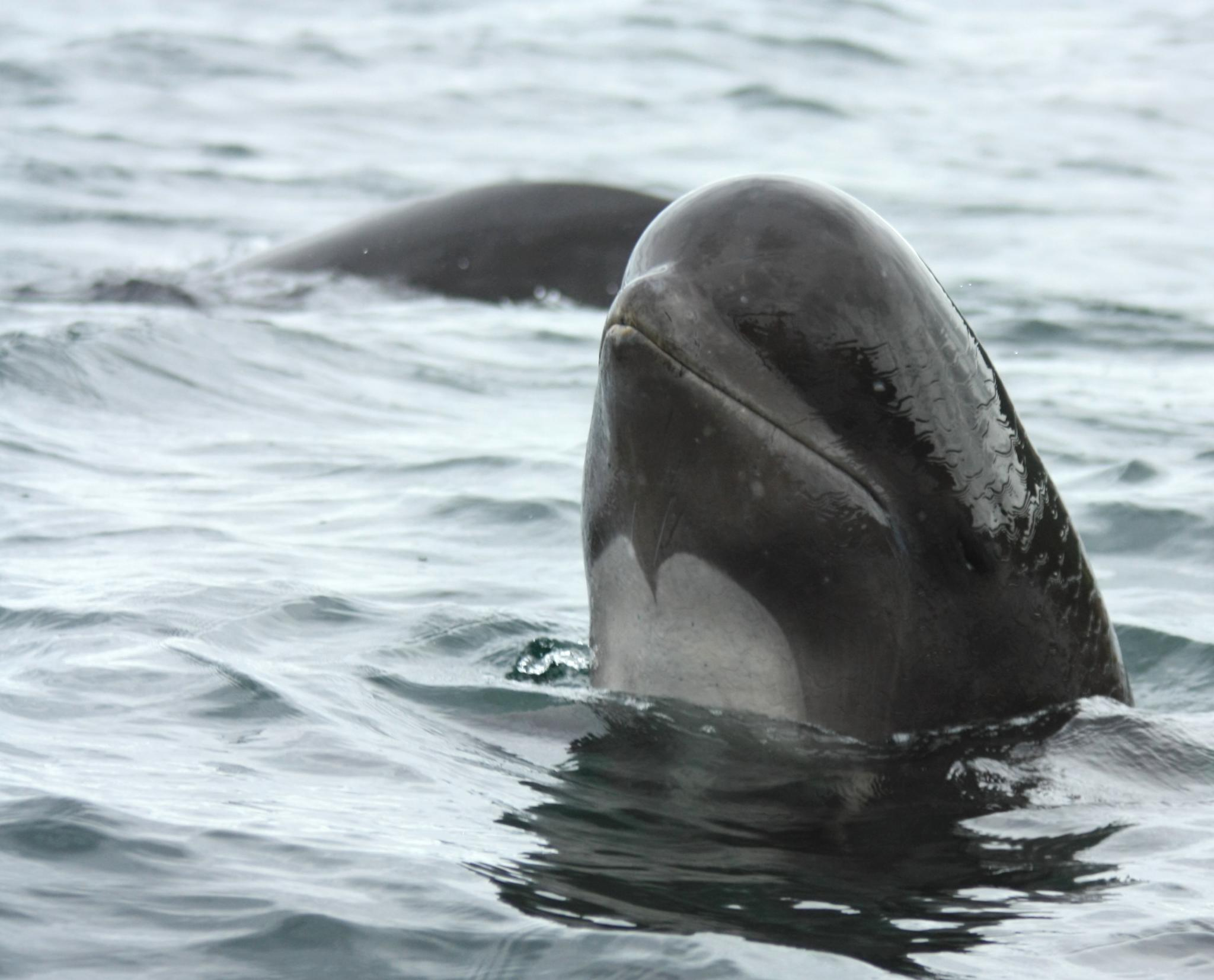
Long-finned pilot whales spyhopping off Cape Breton

== See also ==
- National Parks of Canada
- List of National Parks of Canada
- List of parks in Nova Scotia
