= Cape Breton Highlands =

Mountainous plateau in Nova Scotia, Canada

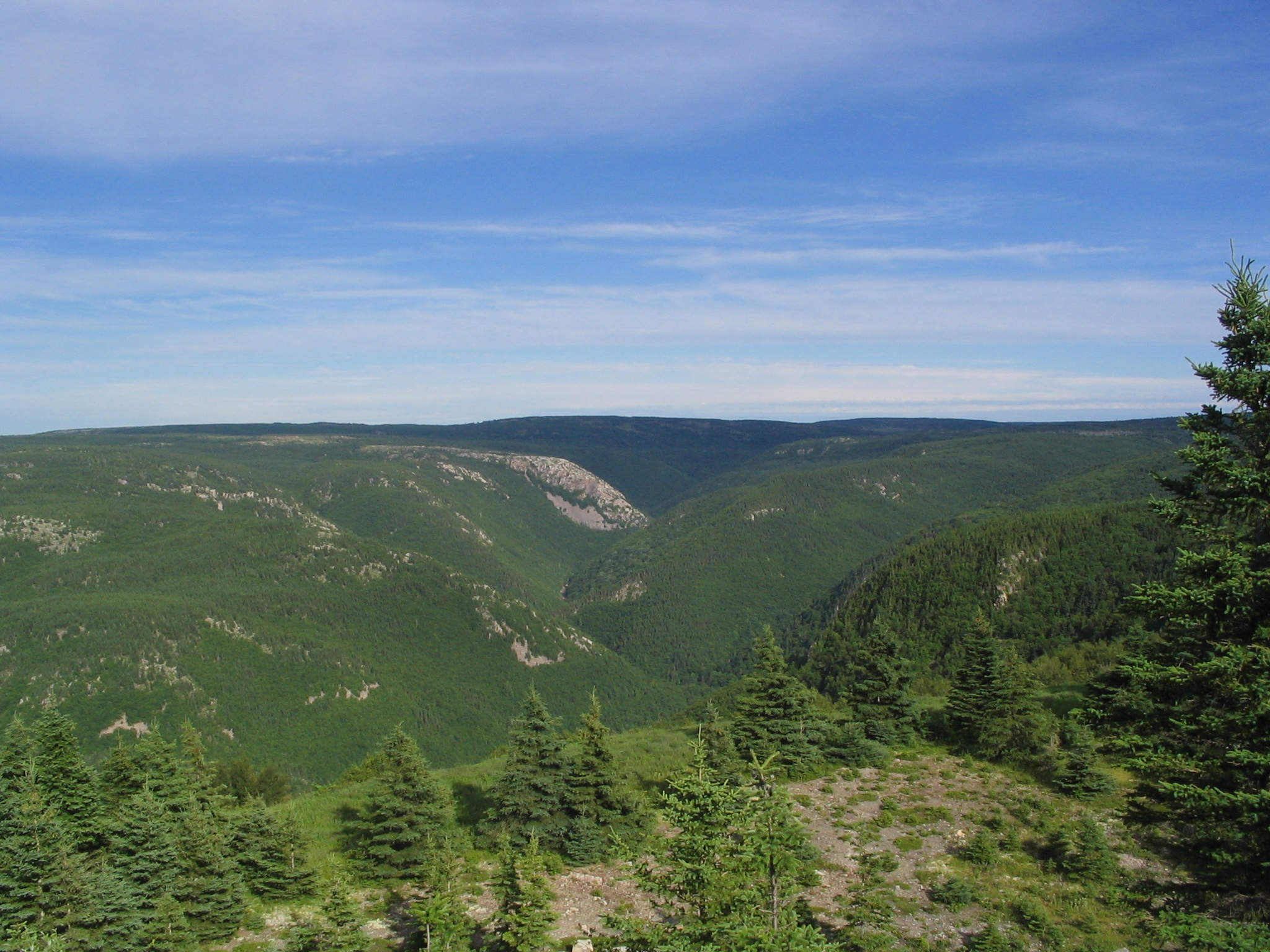

Highest point
- Peak: White Hill
- Elevation: 533 m (1,749 ft)
- Prominence: 533 m (1,749 ft)
- Isolation: 151.6 km (94.2 mi)
- Coordinates: 46°42′8″N 60°35′56″W

Dimensions
- Length: 175 km (109 mi) N -S
- Width: 143 km (89 mi) E - W

Geography
- Location within Nova Scotia Location within Canada
- Location: Cape Breton Island, Nova Scotia, Canada
- Range coordinates: 46°44′59.5″N 60°35′53.7″W
- Parent range: Appalachian Mountains
- Topo map: NTS 11K10 Chéticamp River

Geology
- Rock age: Precambrian
- Mountain type: Fault-block mountains

Climbing
- Access: road/hike

The Cape Breton Highlands (French: Plateau du Cap-Breton, Scottish Gaelic: Àrd-thalamh Cheap Bhreatainn), commonly called the Highlands, is a highland or mountainous plateau across the northern part of Cape Breton Island in the Canadian province of Nova Scotia.

Considered a subrange of the Appalachian mountain chain, the Highlands comprise the northern portions of Inverness and Victoria Counties.

The Highlands are surrounded by water with the Atlantic Ocean on the east, the Cabot Strait to the north and east, the Gulf of St. Lawrence on the north and west, and Bras d'Or Lake to the south. Elevations average 350 metres at the edges of the plateau (at the above-mentioned water bodies), and rise to more than 500 metres at the centre, including the highest elevation point in the province at White Hill, at 533 metres.

The plateau consists of numerous broad, gently rolling hills bisected with deep valleys and steep-walled river canyons. The southern and the western edges of the plateau give way to broad valleys with soils resulting from glaciation and provide some of Cape Breton's best agricultural lands. Most of the interior and southern edges of the plateau are covered with damp, cool deciduous forests which makes for spectacular colours during autumn foliage. Southward facing slopes above 300 metres in elevation generally only support Balsam Fir, as a result of the short growing season and harsh winter climate. The northern and western edges of the plateau, particularly at high elevations, resemble arctic tundra.

The west coast of the Highlands meets the Gulf of St. Lawrence in steep cliffs whereas the east coast borders the Atlantic Ocean with a gently-sloping coastal plain, low headlands, and several beaches.

In 1936 the federal government established the Cape Breton Highlands National Park covering 950 km^{2} across the northern third of the Highlands. The Cabot Trail scenic highway also encircles the coastal perimeter of the plateau. While the coastal areas of Inverness and Victoria counties along the plateau are home to several dozen small fishing and tourism-related communities, the interior of the plateau has no public roads and very little human presence, making it one of Nova Scotia's largest wilderness areas.

Wreck Cove Hydroelectric System is the largest hydroelectric plant in Nova Scotia with a generating capacity of 215.8 MW. Constructed from 1975 to 1978, south of the Cape Breton Highlands National Park, Wreck Cove collects drainage water from 216 square kilometres (83 sq mi) of the Cape Breton Highlands plateau to generate renewable electricity.

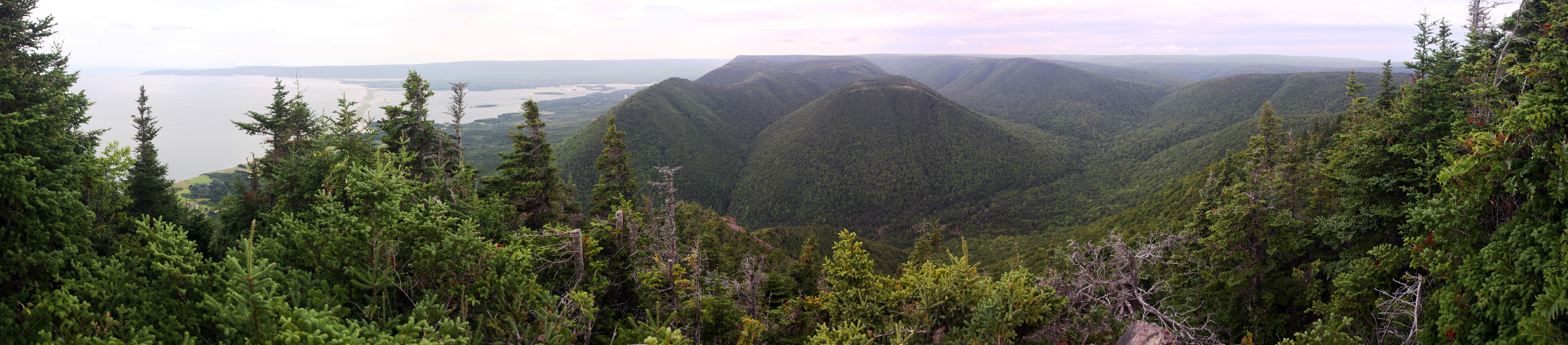
The view of Aspy Bay's North, Middle & South Harbours, the Aspy Fault and the Cape Breton Highlands from the South Lookoff of the Wilkie Sugar Loaf trail.

== See also ==
- Appalachian Uplands
- List of subranges of the Appalachian Mountains
