= Chéticamp River =

Coordinates: 46°36′7.70″N 61°0′4.06″W

Chéticamp
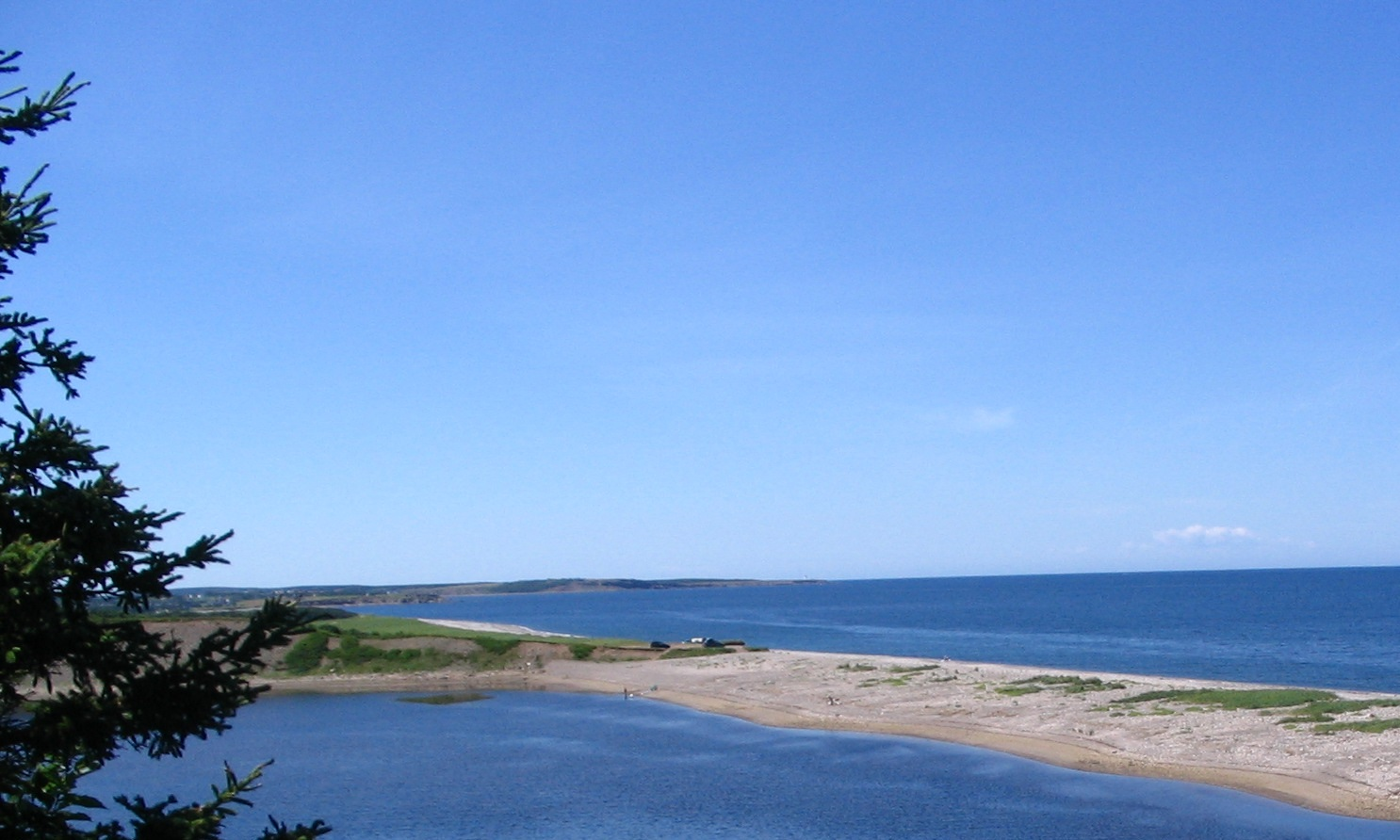

Location
- Country: Canada
- Province: Nova Scotia

Physical characteristics
- Source
  - location: Chéticamp Lake
- Mouth
  - location: Gulf of St. Lawrence
  - elevation: sea level
- Basin size: 806 km^{2} (311 sq mi)

The Chéticamp River is a river on Cape Breton Island, Nova Scotia, located at the western entrance to Cape Breton Highlands National Park which includes Acadian Trail. According to estimates by the Province of Nova Scotia, there are 2,650 people resident within the Chéticamp watershed in 2011.

The river flows from Chéticamp Lake in the Cape Breton Highlands into the Gulf of Saint Lawrence at the village of Chéticamp, Nova Scotia. Some of the outflow of the lake has been diverted for the Wreck Cove Hydroelectric System project.

Atlantic Salmon visit this river to spawn.

== See also ==
- List of rivers of Nova Scotia
