= Coyote attack =

Attack on a human by a coyote

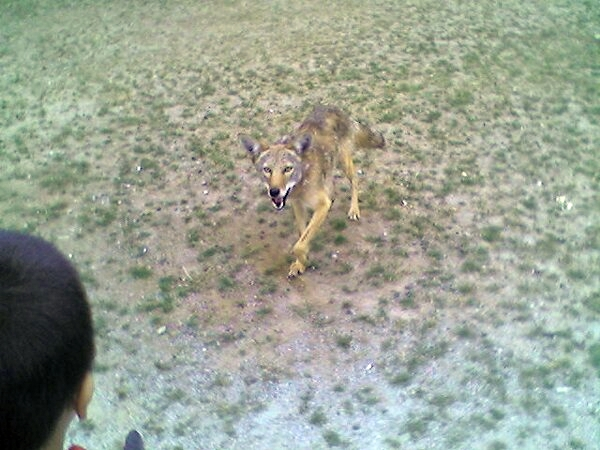
A coyote approaches a child in a school yard in Pitt Meadows, British Columbia, Canada

Coyote attacks are events where coyotes attack humans.

While these attacks are uncommon, they have been increasing in frequency, especially in California.

Although media reports generally identify the animals as simply "coyotes", some attackers in northeast North America may be hybrids known as coywolves.

== Description ==
Coyote attacks on humans are uncommon. In such events where a human is targeted, coyotes usually see children as prey as opposed to adults. Coyotes (in general) are losing their fear of humans, which is further worsened by people intentionally or unintentionally feeding them. In such situations, some coyotes have begun to act aggressively toward humans—chasing joggers and bicyclists, confronting people walking their dogs, and stalking small children. However, others appear to have initially targeted a person's pet, which provoked sequential counter-attacks. Although media reports of such attacks generally identify the animals in question as simply "coyotes", research into the genetics of the eastern coyote indicates those involved in attacks in northeast North America, including Pennsylvania, New York, New England, and Eastern Canada, may have actually been coywolves, hybrids of Canis latrans and wolves.

According to Smithsonian magazine, at least 160 attacks occurred in the United States in the 30 years leading up to March 2006. Most of these attacks occurred in the Los Angeles County, California area. Another data collection specifically focused on that state was also conducted by the University of California, and the United States Department of Agriculture (USDA) Wildlife Services. When fully compiled, the list named 89 verified coyote attacks that were recorded in California between May 1978 and November 2003. The criteria included "when one or more coyotes made physical contact with a child or adult or [the coyote] attacked a pet while in close proximity to its owner." Another study published in 2004 documented 35 incidents in which a minor likely would have "serious or fatal injury" if they had not been rescued.

== List of attacks with human injuries ==
=== Fatal attacks ===
Two fatal coyote attacks on humans have been confirmed by experts:

- On August 26, 1981, a coyote grabbed three-year-old Kelly Keen in the driveway of her father's home in Glendale, California, and dragged her across the road. Her father rescued her by chasing the coyote away and rushed her to a medical center, but she died in surgery due to blood loss and a broken neck.
- On October 27, 2009, two eastern coyotes (coywolves) mauled 19-year-old singer-songwriter Taylor Mitchell at Cape Breton Highlands National Park in Nova Scotia, Canada. She was on a hiking break from her concert tour when they stalked and chased her down the Skyline Trail. An air ambulance airlifted her to a medical center, but she died a few hours later from severe injuries and blood loss. A 2022 study by Stan Gehrt, wildlife ecologist at Ohio State University, revealed the coyotes had expanded their diet to include moose rather than their typical diet of smaller animals. It was concluded that the relative unavailability of smaller prey in the area due to the unique ecological characteristics of the Highlands led the coyotes to become accustomed to large targets, leading them to see Mitchell as a potential food source.

=== Non-fatal attacks ===
The following table includes non-fatal attacks that involve injuries to two or more humans, or a notable individual. Attacks with only one human victim are not included, even if the injuries are serious.

Date	State or Provence	Country	Humans injured (Note: Two or more injured humans, or a notable individual.)	Age	Rabid?	Short summary
January 1997	California - San Juan Capistrano	United States	2	Adults	Unknown	Two women were attacked. One was bitten on her ankle and pulled to the ground.
December 17, 1997	Arizona - Scottsdale	United States	2	Children	Unknown	Coyotes bit two children. Neither had serious injuries.
October 2001	California - San Clemente	United States	2	Children	Unknown	A coyote attacked two children in a schoolyard. An eight-year-old was bitten on the back of her neck. A seven-year-old was bitten on his back and arm.
April 2005	Alberta - Calgary	Canada	2	Children	Unknown	Two toddlers were bitten in the head in separate attacks. A coyote was euthanized and tested for rabies.
April 2006	Washington - Bellevue	United States	2	Children	Unknown	Two coyotes bit two young children. The coyotes were euthanized.
April–May 2007	New Jersey - Middletown	United States	2	Children	Unknown	A coyote grabbed a toddler. A month later, a boy was bitten on the head.
May 2008	Maine	United States	1	Adult	Unknown	Magazine writer Blaine Cardilli was bitten by a coyote while turkey hunting.
April 6, 2010	Texas - Port Aransas	United States	2	Children	Unknown	Two Boy Scouts, 14 and 15 years old, were bitten by a coyote while sleeping outside their tent on the beach. They received preventive rabies shots.
July–September 2011	Colorado - Broomfield	United States	3	Children	Unknown	Three children between the ages of two and six were bitten. All four encounters are thought to have involved the same coyote, which was euthanised.
March 2012	Arizona - Peoria	United States	3	Adults	Unknown	A coyote bit two women and a man.
March 2013	Colorado - Colorado Springs	United States	2	Children	Unknown	In Goose Gossage park, a coyote nipped a four-year-old and bit a two-year-old on the head as she came down a slide.
January 14, 2014	Ontario - Markham	Canada	2	Adults	Unknown	Two women were bitten.
June 23, 2014	Ontario - Thornhill	Canada	2	Adults	Unknown	A woman was bitten on the leg and the other on the hip. Both began preventive treatment for rabies.
September–November 2014	Ontario - Brampton	Canada	3	Adults	Unknown	Two adults were bitten by a coyote in separate attacks. Nearby in Mississauga, a man defending his dogs was seriously injured.
December 25, 2014	California - Fremont	United States	2	Adult & child	No	An unhealthy-looking coyote bit the leg of a man walking his children to his car outside a home. After the attack, a boy a block away was bitten by the coyote. The coyote was euthanized.
January 5, 2015	Massachusetts - Groveland	United States	2	Adults	Unknown	In separate attacks, two men were bitten by a coyote outside their homes.
July 2015	California - Irvine	United States	4	Children	Unknown	4 children injured in separate attacks.
October 14, 2015	California - Irvine	United States	2	Adult & child	Unknown	A man and his three-year-old son were injured by a coyote while they were in a garden.
August 2016	California - Montebello	United States	3	Adults	Unknown	In separate incidents, three people were attacked in Grant Rea Park by a coyote (the third victim had nineteen bites). Four coyotes were euthanized.
October 2, 2016	New York - Wolcott	United States	2	Adults	Unknown	A coyote bit two women and a dog.
November 30, 2016	New York - Ossining	United States	2	Adults	Yes	A rabid coyote bit two people in separate attacks.
May 19, 2018	North Carolina - Mocksville	United States	2	Adult & child	Unknown	A man and his seven-year-old daughter were injured by a coyote in their backyard.
July 2018	Quebec - Montreal	Canada	3	Children	Unknown	Coyotes in Ahuntsic-Cartierville mauled a five-year-old boy, a five-year-old girl and a three-year-old girl.
September–October 2018	Illinois - Elwood	United States	3	Adults	No	A coyote injured three workers. It later tested negative for rabies. Authorities believe the attacks stemmed from it being fed by workers.
October 2018 – January 2019	Texas - Frisco	United States	2	Adult & child	Unknown	An adult jogger and a child were injured in separate coyote attacks. The adult suffered significant injury to his neck. Authorities removed one coyote, but an attack was reported a month later.
January 26, 2019	Florida - Kissimmee	United States	3	Adults	Yes	A rabid coyote attacked a man walking down his street. It separately attacked his wife and a neighbor.
April 1, 2019	Vermont - Salisbury	United States	2	Adults	Yes	A rabid coyote attacked an elderly couple on their farm.
June 13, 2019	New Jersey - Fairfield	United States	2	Adult & child	Unknown	A coyote mauled a 34-year-old woman and her four-year-old son in the recreation complex.
September 1, 2019	South Carolina - Columbia	United States	4	Adults	Yes	A rabid coyote attacked four people around an apartment complex.
October 2019	New Jersey - Mahwah	United States	2	Adults	Unknown	A man and a woman were attacked separately by a coyote on the Ramapo Valley County Reservation.
November 2019	New Jersey - New Brunswick	United States	2	Adults	No	A coyote in the Rutgers Ecological Preserve bit two people on separate occasions. Rutgers police officers killed it.
January 2020	New Hampshire	United States	2	Adults	Yes	A rabid coyote bit a woman and her dogs as she opened her door in Hampton Falls. It also attacked a family out for a walk in Exeter, grabbing their toddler, who was protected by his jacket and uninjured. The father strangled the coyote, but got bitten.
January 2020	Illinois - Chicago	United States	2	Adult & child	No	Outside a museum, a five-year-old boy was bitten multiple times, including in his head. A few hours later, a man was attacked by a coyote a few miles away.
February 2020	Pennsylvania - Newberry Township	United States	2	Adults	Yes	A rabid coyote attacked two men. It was killed the next day.
April 2020 – March 2021	California - East Bay	United States	5	Adults & children	No	The Califiornia Department of Fish and Wildlife euthanized a coyote that had attacked five people, including two children, in Moraga and Lafayette.
September 24, 2020	North Carolina - Camp Lejeune	United States	4	Adults	Unknown	Three Marines and a sailor were bitten in separate incidents while training.
October 1, 2020	Maryland - Rockville	United States	3	Adults & child	Yes	A rabid coyote attacked two women and a boy.
October 15, 2020	Ontario - Vaughan	Canada	3	Adults	Unknown	Three people were bitten in separate attacks near Pheasant Hollow Park over a three-day period.
December 2020 – August 2021	British Columbia - Stanley Park	Canada	45	Adults & Children	Unknown	During the COVID-19 pandemic, there was an unusual cluster of attacks in which 45 people were injured. Authorities removed 11 coyotes.
March 2021	North Carolina - Greensboro	United States	4	Adults	Unknown	Four people were bitten in separate attacks on mountain bikers and hikers on the Lake Brandt trails.
June 2021	Alberta - Nolan Hill	Canada	6	Adults & child	Unknown	Two coyotes were euthanized after two weeks of attacks. The bodies were sent for rabies testing, but no results were made public.
July 2021	Ontario - Oshawa	Canada	2	Children	Unknown	In less than a week, two children were bitten by a coyote.
September 2021	Massachusetts - Arlington	United States	2	Children	Unknown	A coyote attacked two 2-year-old girls 10 minutes apart. The coyote was not found.
November 2021	Ontario -Toronto	Canada	2	Adults	Unknown	Two people were bitten at Bayview Village Park. The coyote was euthanized.
April 2022	California	United States	2	Children	No	A toddler playing near her mother on Huntington Beach was severely injured by a coyote. The attack was caught on camera. Its DNA matched an earlier attack on a toddler in Fountain Valley.
June 2022	Virginia - Fairfax County	United States	4	Adults	Yes	A rabid coyote bit four people in Lake Accotink and was euthanized by an animal control officer.
August–September 2022	Ontario - Burlington	Canada	7	Adults & child	Unknown	Victims included a two-year-old boy bitten on the neck and dragged, and a retirement-home resident bitten while napping on the porch. Three coyotes were euthanized.
August 12, 2022	California - Marin Headlands	United States	1	Adult	Unknown	Ultramarathoner Dean Karnazes stated he was attacked by a coyote during a race, although this is disputed.
November 2022	New York - Westchester County	United States	2	Adults	Yes	A rabid coyote attacked two women.
March 2023	Arizona - Scottsdale	United States	2	Children	Unknown	A coyote caught on camera attacking a child was believed to be responsible for an earlier attack.
July 2023	Manitoba - Winnipeg	Canada	2	Children	Unknown	A nine-year-old boy walking with his older sister was mauled by a coyote. The same coyote was believed responsible for an attack on a four-year-old a few days later.
July 2023	New Jersey - South Mountain Reservation	United States	2	Adult & child	Unknown	A 13-year-old child and her dog were attacked by a coyote. A few hours later a woman in the same area was also attacked. Both attacks occurred in the Maplewood section of the reservation.
August 2023	Louisiana - Fort Johnson	United States	6	Adults	Unknown	Six National Guardsmen were attacked by four coyotes during a training exercise.
September 2023	British Columbia - Mission	Canada	9	Adults	Unknown	Within a five-day period, nine people were attacked in separate incidents. Most occurred in the Silverdale Creek Wetlands. A coyote was euthanized.
October 2023	Texas - Corpus Christi	United States	4	Adults	Unknown	Four people were bitten within one mile of a beach-access parking lot on North Padre Island.
December 2023	Arizona - Phoenix	United States	3	Adults & child	Unknown	Two adults and a four-year-old were bitten in separate attacks.
January 2024	Nevada - Lake Las Vegas	United States	4	Adults & child	Unknown	Four people were bitten, including a two-year-old girl.
February 2024	Texas - Arlington	United States	3	Children	No	Three children were bitten in separate attacks.
February 7–8, 2024	Rhode Island - Johnston	United States	2	Adults	Yes	A rabid coyote bit two people before being strangled by a hiker.
April 2024	Maryland - Ashton	United States	2	Adults	Yes	A rabid coyote attacked two women in separate attacks, hours apart.
April 27, 2024	North Carolina - Uwharrie National Forest	United States	2	Adults	Yes	A rabid coyote attacked two people.
May 2024	Massachusetts - Agawam	United States	2	Adults	Yes	A rabid coyote attacked two women in Robinson State Park.
June 2024	New York - Ithaca	United States	2	Adults	Unknown	Two people were attacked by a coyote in the Monkey Run Natural Area.
July 2024	Nevada - Henderson	United States	2	Adults	Unknown	Two women were bitten in separate attacks in the Pittman Wash area.
December 15, 2024	British Columbia - Richmond	Canada	2	Adults	Unknown	A man and a woman walking near Hamilton Community Park were attacked by a coyote.
March 2025	Washington -Bellevue	United States	3	Adults & child	No	An elderly woman sitting outside was bitten on the hip. The next day a man working in his garage was bitten. Days later, a four-year-old child was bitten outside her front door. The coyote and its mate were euthanized.
April 2025	Texas - Dallas	United States	2	Children	Unknown	Two children were injured by a coyote on White Rock Creek Trail.
May 2025	Florida - Atlantic Beach	United States	3	Adults	Yes	A rabid coyote attacked three people. It was shot by an officer and found dead the next day.
September 2025	New Jersey - Saddle River	United States	2	Adults	Yes	Two people were attacked by a coyote in separate incidents. Authorities euthanized two rabid coyotes.
November 26, 2025	California - San Diego	United States	2	Children	No	Two children were injured by a coyote in separate attacks at the Westfield University Towne Center mall.
December 26–27, 2025	Georgia - Gwinnett County	United States	3	Adults	Yes	A rabid coyote bit three people in separate attacks.
February–April 2026	California - Carson	United States	2	Children	Unknown	A coyote seen on video attacking a four-year-old boy in his driveway has been linked to an earlier attack in February. The same coyote is suspected of attacking two additional people.
March 2026	New York - Westchester County	United States	3	Adults	Yes	A rabid coyote attacked three people and six dogs.
May 2026	California - Laguna Woods	United States	3	Adults	Unknown	Three residents of a retirement community were injured; one was hospitalized.
May 2026	Ontario - Markham	Canada	2	Children	Unknown	A 16-year-old girl suffered minor injuries after being attacked by a coyote. Less than a week later, a five-year-old boy was bitten on the head, presumably by the same coyote.
June 2026	Ontario - Whitby	Canada	2	Children	Unknown	A toddler was seriously injured and hospitalized following an attack at a crowded park. The same coyote is believed responsible for another attack in which a toddler in a different park was bitten on the face.
September 6, 2026	Arizona - Phoenix	United States	2	Adult & child	Unknown	A four-year-old girl was attacked by a coyote. Her mother tried to drive it away, but fell and was bitten on her face. Authorities later killed four coyotes.
September 14, 2026	Connecticut - Fairfield	United States	2	Adults	Yes	A rabid coyote separately attacked two people and was euthanized by police. Only the second person was bitten, but the first victim needed rabies shots as well due to the seriousness of the exposure.

== See also ==
- Death of Azaria Chamberlain
- Death of Kenton Joel Carnegie
- Dingo attack
- List of fatal dog attacks in the United States
- List of wolf attacks in North America
- List of large carnivores known to prey on humans
