= Kelly Keen coyote attack =

1981 fatal coyote attack in the United States

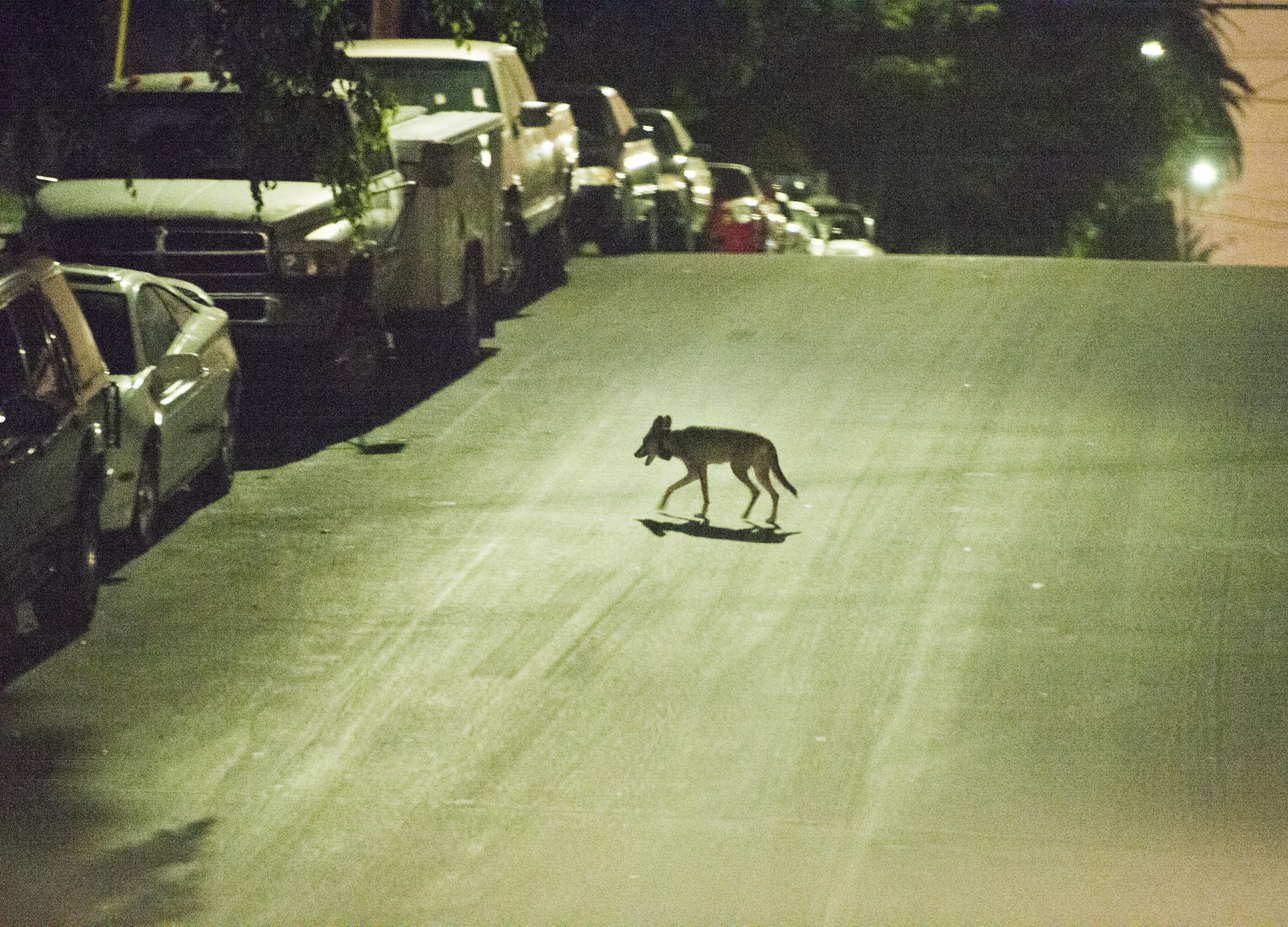
A coyote crossing the street in the Westlake neighborhood of Los Angeles, California

The Kelly Keen coyote attack is the only known fatal coyote attack on a child, as well as the only known fatal coyote attack on a human ever confirmed in the United States. On August 26, 1981, three-year-old Los Angeles resident Kelly Lynn Keen was dragged off her property and fatally wounded by an urban coyote before she could be rescued by her father. The event is also notable for its aftermath, in which large numbers of coyotes were killed and two animal rights activists provoked an uproar by claiming that her parents, not the coyote, had killed her.

== Attack ==
On August 26, 1981, a three-year-old girl named Kelly Keen was left unsupervised in her living room while her parents did some daily chores. Kelly was watching educational television programs in the living room of the family's home in the Chevy Chase Canyon neighborhood of Glendale, California, but she let herself out the front door and stepped into the driveway, where she encountered an urban coyote. The coyote took Kelly in its mouth and ran off, dragging her through the street. Her father, Robert, quickly came running, chased the coyote off, and rushed Kelly to the Glendale Adventist Medical Center, where she was in surgery for four hours before she died. The cause of death was determined to be a broken neck and blood loss as a direct result of the coyote attack. She is buried at Forest Lawn Memorial Park in Glendale.

== Aftermath ==
=== Government reaction ===
Following Keen's death, the Los Angeles Animal Regulation Commission developed the first serious urban coyote management program, including 80 days of leghold trapping and shooting within a 0.5-mile (0.8-km) radius of the attack site, during which county personnel trapped and shot 55 coyotes.

=== Accusations by animal rights activists ===
In 2004, former child actress and animal rights activist Pamelyn Ferdin attended a Glendale City Council meeting to oppose a proposal to cull urban coyotes. Ferdin addressed the Council wearing a shirt covered in fake blood, urging the city not to kill coyotes. She mentioned the Kelly Keen attack, and argued that rather than having been killed by a coyote, Keen had been the victim of child abuse. She claimed that medical records indicated that the child died of a ruptured spleen, which could only have come from blunt trauma, not an animal bite. Fellow animal rights activist Michael Bell went further, claiming that, after digging around in hospital records, he discovered discrepancies and missing documents. He stated that the coyote story was a cover-up for how the child really died. Kelly's parents, Robert and Cathy Keen, watched the meeting live on cable and, upon hearing Bell's statement, raced to the Glendale City Hall to respond to the allegations. They recounted the event to the council, and showed the death certificate, which listed the cause of the child's injuries as "mauled by a coyote".

Ferdin's stance remained unchanged; "I stand by my beliefs that a coyote did not kill [Kelly Keen]." Councilman Frank Quintero stated: "What the activists said at the dais was cruel and absolutely uninformed ... Knowing the mother, it broke my heart that they would do that to her. When they were making the accusations, I was considering stopping them."

== Similar attacks ==
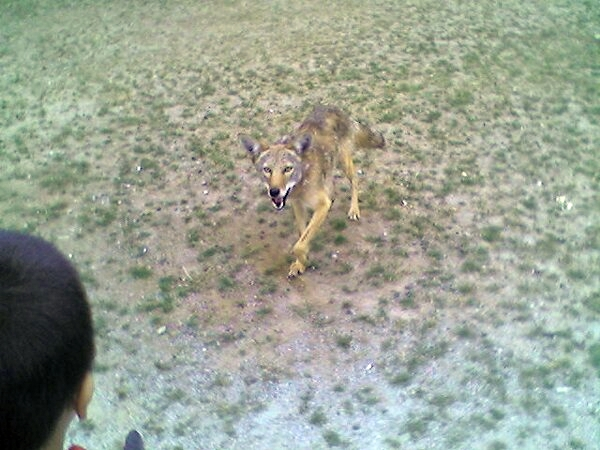
An urban coyote approaches a child in a school yard in Pitt Meadows, British Columbia

USDA and California State University researchers have confirmed at least thirty-five incidents in the state in which "the possibility of serious or fatal injury seems likely if the child had not been rescued" from coyotes.

== See also ==
- Death of Azaria Chamberlain
- Death of Kenton Joel Carnegie
- Death of Diane Whipple
- Death of Taylor Mitchell
- Animal attacks
