= Rutgers University–New Brunswick =

Public university in New Brunswick and Piscataway, New Jersey, US

Rutgers The State University of New Jersey New Brunswick
- Former names: Queen's College (1766–1816); Rutgers College (1825–1924); Rutgers University
- Motto: Sol iustitiae et occidentem illustra
- Motto in English: Sun of righteousness, shine upon the West also.
- Type: Public land-grant research university
- Established: November 10, 1766; 260 years ago
- Parent institution: Rutgers University
- Academic affiliations: Space-grant
- Endowment: $1.99 billion (2023) (system-wide)
- Budget: $4.8 billion (2022)
- Chancellor: Francine Conway
- President: William F. Tate IV
- Academic staff: 8,500
- Administrative staff: 5,340
- Students: 43,859
- Location: New Brunswick-Piscataway, New Jersey, U.S; 40°30′09″N 74°26′55″W
- Campus: Urban/suburban 2,688 acres (1,088 ha)
- Alma Mater: On the Banks of the Old Raritan
- Colors: Scarlet
- Nickname: Scarlet Knights
- Sporting affiliations: NCAA Division I FBS – Big Ten
- Mascot: Scarlet Knight
- Website: newbrunswick.rutgers.edu

Rutgers University–New Brunswick is the largest campus of Rutgers University, a public land-grant research university consisting of three major campuses in New Jersey. It is located primarily in New Brunswick and Piscataway. It is the oldest and flagship campus of the university, the other satellite campuses being in Camden and Newark. The New Brunswick campus is composed of several smaller campuses that are some distances away from each other: College Avenue, Busch, Livingston, Cook, and Douglass, the latter two sometimes referred to as "Cook/Douglass", as they are adjacent and intertwined. All of these campuses lie along State Route 18. Rutgers–New Brunswick also includes several buildings in downtown New Brunswick. It is classified among "R1: Doctoral Universities – Very high research activity".

== History ==
The eighth of nine colleges established during the American colonial period, Rutgers was chartered as Queen's College on 10 November 1766. It was renamed Rutgers College in 1825 after Colonel Henry Rutgers (1745–1830), an American Revolutionary War hero, philanthropist, and an early benefactor of the school. Originally established as a private institution affiliated with the Dutch Reformed Church, it is now a secular institution. After a series of expansions and mergers in the 19th and early 20th centuries, Rutgers College was renamed Rutgers University in 1924, and became the state university of New Jersey under legislation passed in 1945 and 1956. Rutgers is the only colonial chartered college, that is also a land-grant institution, and a state university.

== Campuses ==
Each of the five campuses hosts their own student center, libraries, commercial venues, dining halls, and residence buildings. However, the physical atmosphere of each campus differs and may also host specific academic departments, facilities, and schools.

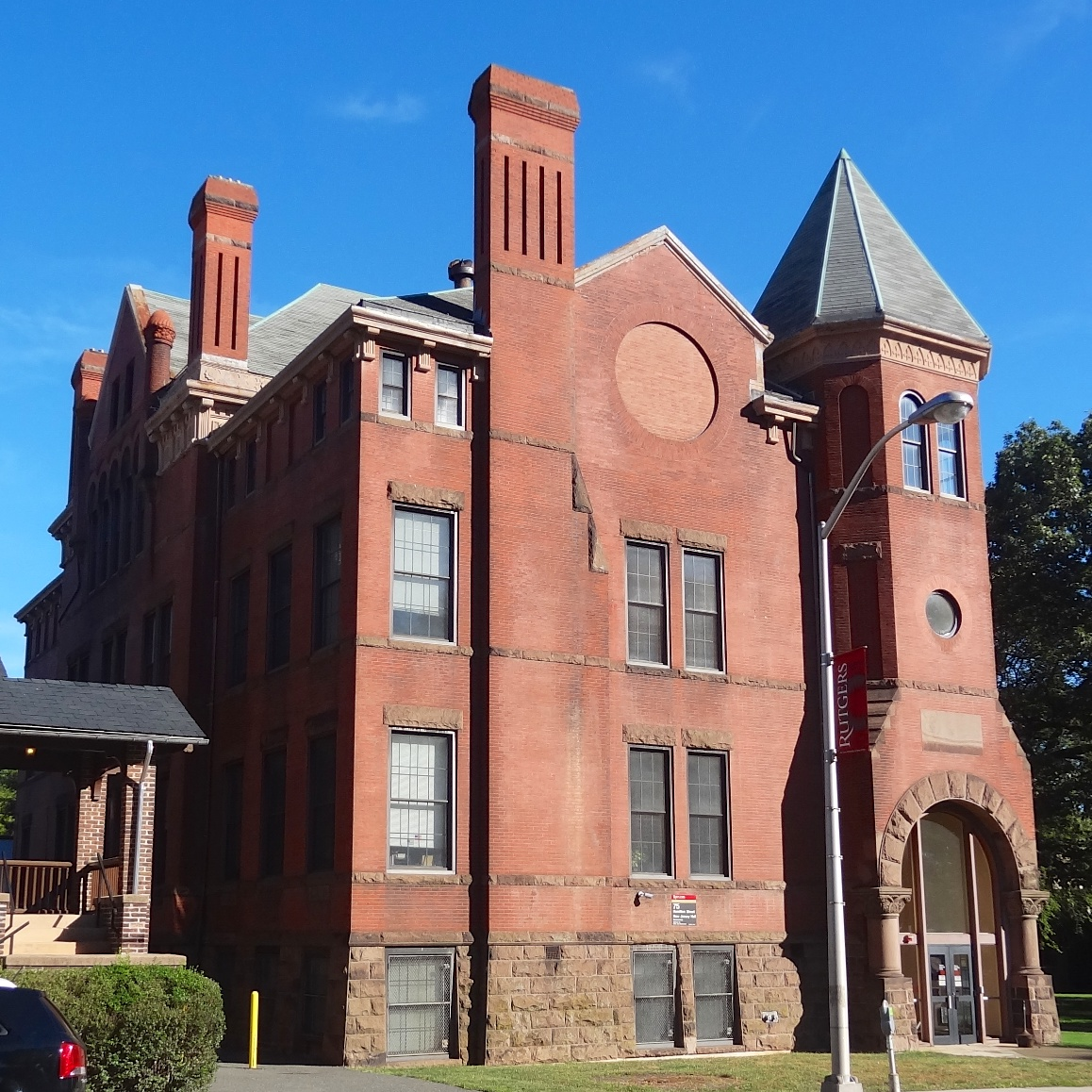
New Jersey Hall houses the economics department at Rutgers.

- Busch: Busch Campus is located entirely within Piscataway Township, New Jersey. The campus is named after Charles L. Busch (1902–1971), a wealthy benefactor, who unexpectedly donated $10 million to the university for biological research at his death in 1971. The campus was formerly known as "University Heights Campus" and the land was donated to the university by the state in the 1930s. The land was formerly a country club and the original golf course still exists on the campus. The campus is home to the SHI Stadium, and provides a high-tech and suburban atmosphere focusing on academic areas primarily related to the natural sciences; Physics, Engineering, Mathematics & Statistics, Pharmacy, Chemistry, Geology, Biology and Psychology. The Rutgers Medical School was also built on this campus in 1970 but a year later was separated by the State to create the College of Medicine and Dentistry of New Jersey (now UMDNJ). The two universities continue to share the land and facilities on the campus in a slightly irregular arrangement. The medical school again became part of Rutgers in 2014.
- College Avenue: this campus includes the historic seat of the university, a block known as Old Queens campus. It is within walking distance of shops, restaurants, and theaters in downtown New Brunswick, as well as the NJ Transit train station which provides easy access to New York and Philadelphia. The New Brunswick NJ Transit station also provides Amtrak service, with connections to Washington, D.C. and other major cities. Many classes are taught in the area around Voorhees Mall and river-side dorms. The Yard is a popular spot for students featuring restaurants, housing, and a grassy area. There are also many off-campus housing options on this campus specifically including apartments and houses. Student life is at its peak almost every night on this campus. Many additional Rutgers facilities, considered off-campus, are dispersed throughout downtown New Brunswick in various buildings or portions thereof.
- Cook: Farms, gardens, and research centers are found on the George H. Cook Campus, including the School of Environmental and Biological Sciences (formerly Cook College), the Institute of Marine and Coastal Sciences, Rutgers Gardens, and the Center for Advanced Food Technology. It is also home to community improvement programs, such as Rutgers Against Hunger, the New Brunswick Community Farmers Market and statewide programs under the Rutgers Cooperative Extension. Several farm animals, and plant exhibits are kept on this campus. Some of the most remote portions of the campus are located in the townships of North Brunswick and East Brunswick.

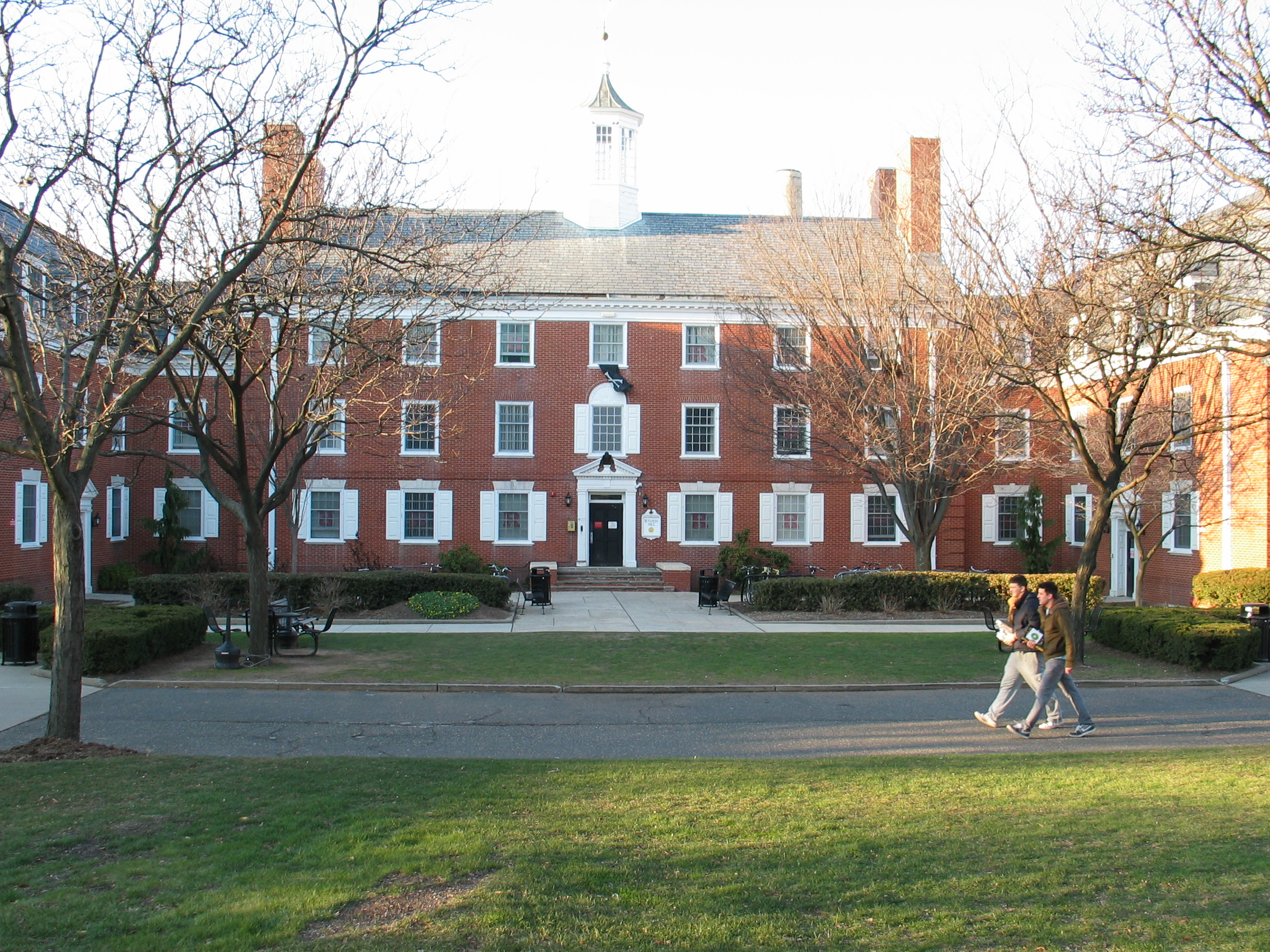
Demarest Hall

- Douglass: adjacent to New Brunswick's second ward, it shares many of its open fields with the adjacent Cook campus. The school has many stately buildings with traditional architecture. Douglass Campus is home to the Douglass Residential College for women and has four women's-only housing options. It was previously the home of the degree granting Douglass College, a liberal arts college for women.
- Livingston: Livingston Campus is home to many of the social science departments and the Rutgers Business School. The Rutgers Athletic Performance Center, or APC (previously known as the Rutgers Athletic Center), is found here, located next to the Jersey Mike's arena, host to Rutgers Basketball games and other events. The student-founded Livingston Theater, and the Rutgers Ecological Preserve are also found here. The campus is situated in Piscataway Township although it extends into parts of Edison Township and Highland Park. Livingston Campus was recently expanded and renovated. Formerly known as Kilmer Campus, the campus was originally the home of Livingston College.

=== Facilities ===
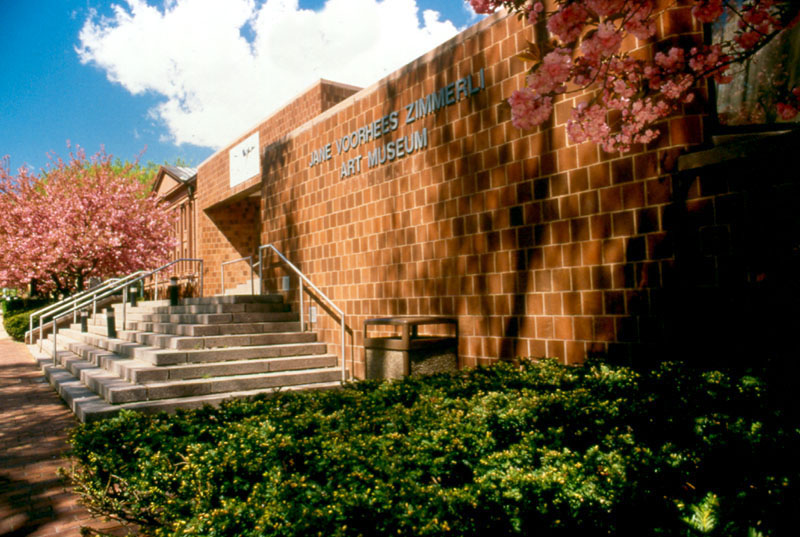
The Zimmerli Art Museum on College Avenue

- Libraries: Libraries are located on every campus for student/faculty use. Libraries provide access to printing and computer services, as well as a variety of books and designated study spaces. Students may also book private study rooms within most libraries for secluded discussions or uninterrupted work.
- Transportation: The campus bus and shuttle system is a service provided as a means to travel between the five campuses. Nine weekday bus lines between campuses exist due to the sheer passenger volume and distances involved. Class times are staggered across campuses to accommodate for travel times, with most students allotted 30 minutes of travel time as of the Fall 2024 schedule.
- Computing centers: Student accessible computers are mainly concentrated within computer labs. Rutgers has many computing centers to serve the university community.
- Meals: The dining services claim to be the third largest student dining operation in the US, serving 4.5 million meals annually. There are four student dining facilities which also provide catering for over 5000 University events yearly. The dining halls on Busch, College Avenue, and Livingston campuses also have faculty dining rooms. Dining halls provide various "event nights" including a midnight breakfast during exams week and King Neptune Night. All student centers also provide food services, mostly "fast food" style. Rutgers Meal swipes can also be used at certain locations such as Cafe West, Henrys Diner, Kilmer's Market, Woody's Cafe, Starbucks truck and more!
- Food Pantry: The Food Pantry started in 2016 located in the College Ave student center. It is offered to any Rutgers students who show a valid RUID card. The food pantry offers food for people who may not be able to afford it or for any other reason. They get their food from many donations. Their hours are Tuesday-Friday 12 p.m. – 4 p.m. with the exception of Thursday being their Mobile food pantry located on Busch, Livingston, and Douglass.
- Health centers: Rutgers has 3 health centers/pharmacies which provide primary care to Rutgers students. The RUHS nurse line is available at no charge to Rutgers University students when the Health Centers are closed. Hurtado Health Center is located on the College Avenue campus, and the Busch-Livingston Health Center shares a parking lot with the RAC on the Livingston Campus.
- Museums: the Jane Voorhees Zimmerli Art Museum is located in Voorhees Mall of the College Avenue campus. It was founded in 1966 and later named after Jane Voorhees Zimmerli who was the mother of philanthropist Alan Voorhees. The Geology Museum is also located on college Avenue Campus. The Mason Gross Galleries are located downtown at Civic Square.

== Academics ==
Academic rankings

National
- Forbes: 70
- U.S. News & World Report: 44
- Washington Monthly: 62

Global
- ARWU: 101–150
- QS: 328 (tie)
- THE: 301–350
- U.S. News & World Report: 156 (tie)

In the 2027 U.S. News & World Report rankings, Rutgers University-New Brunswick ranked 14th among public universities in the United States.

Based on information provided in 2027, the institution has a 70% four-year graduation rate and a 16:1 student-to-faculty ratio; 35% of classes enroll fewer than 20 students. Its most popular major is computer and information sciences, followed by psychology, finance, information science, and biology. Reported starting salaries are highest for computer and information sciences graduates.

== Residence life ==
Residence halls provide many facilities for students. With over 15,000 resident students, 5 different campuses each with its own identity, 58 residence halls, 4 dining halls and 30-plus food courts/cafés, students can find everything they need right on campus. Despite some over-crowding, students wishing to live on-campus are usually accommodated, with a lottery system for non-incoming freshmen determining the order in which students choose their preferred housing. Single, double, and triple-occupancy rooms (in traditional residence halls), apartments housing four students each, and suites housing six (or four, as in BEST Hall) students each are available. Rooms and apartments are single-sex, with the exception of married graduate student housing, which also permit children of students. The other exceptions to this rule are the Livingston Apartments, Demarest Hall, and Rainbow Perspective Special Interest Rooms in New Gibbons. (These, however require special applications to be made) Most floors and buildings are co-ed, with the exception of Douglass Residential College facilities for women. Rooms usually contain beds, desks, chairs, dressers, and a closet for each student. Cable/internet access are also provided, but due to the widespread use of mobile phones, traditional land-line phone service is no longer provided in the halls. Many residence halls include laundries, main lounges with TVs, foosball and ping-pong, floor lounges with sofas, study tables, and kitchenettes, study lounges, and vending machines. Every floor or house has a resident assistant, an upper class student mentor who has received special training and is responsible for handling a number of tasks, such as planning programs and events, monitoring for safety, and documenting policy and procedure violations.

In the past, due to overcrowding, Rutgers has rented rooms for students in the Franklin Township Crowne Plaza. Shuttle buses provided transportation to campus for these students.

Residence halls by campus:

- Busch Campus: BAMM Residence Halls: Barr, Allen, Mattia, Metzger. Suites: Crosby, Judson, McCormick, Morrow, Thomas, Winkler, BEST Hall (North, East, and West). Apartments: Nichols, Richardson, Silvers, Marvin. Graduate-only Apartments: Buell, Johnson.
- College Avenue Campus: Bishop Beach Residence Halls: Brett, Demarest, Mettler, Tinsley, Stonier. Bishop Quad Residence Halls: Clothier, Hegeman, Leupp, Pell, Wessels. River Dorms: Campbell, Frelinghuysen, Hardenbergh. Apartments: University Center, Sojourner Truth Apartments (formerly College Avenue Apartments). Invite-only: Honors College.
- Cook Campus: Residence Halls: Helyar House, Lippincott, Nicholas, Perry, Voorhees. Apartments: Newell, Starkey.
- Douglass Campus: Residence Halls: Bunting-Cobb, Katzenbach, Jameson (A-B-C-D-G), New Gibbons, Woodbury. Apartments: Henderson.
- Livingston Campus: Residence Halls: Lynton Towers (North and South), The Quads (1-2-3). Apartments: Livingston Apartments (A-B-C).

Other Halls: Davidson (Busch: Closed in 2016), Ford (College Avenue: Closed 2013), Corwin (Cook: Closed 2013), Old Gibbons (Douglass: Closed 2020), Rockoff (Downtown: Now off-campus).

=== Graduate student housing ===
Three complexes provide graduate housing. They are Johnson Apartments, Marvin Apartments, and Nichols Apartments. Marvin Apartments and Nichols Apartments offer housing for graduate students with families, whereas Johnson Apartments are shared by two single graduate students. All three apartment facilities are located in Piscataway Township on Busch Campus.

In 1966 Johnson was built. In 1973 Marvin was built. Nichols was constructed in 1975.

== Student life ==
Rutgers–New Brunswick has more than 500 student clubs and organizations, including academic, social, service, cultural, and athletic organizations, according to the Rutgers clubs and organizations website.

=== Student newspaper ===
- The Daily Targum, founded in 1869, the largest student paper at Rutgers, with a circulation of 15,000. It features international, national, local and university news, as well as editorials, columns, comics, classifieds, and sports.

=== Other publications ===
- The BVCL (Black Voice Carte Latina), a publication of Black/Hispanic students
- The Caellian, the progressive paper of Douglass Residential College, featuring artistic submissions and LGBT-related issues
- The Centurion, a monthly conservative magazine
- The Green Print, a general news environmental issue publication
- The Medium, a weekly student run publication which satirizes events at both the university and national levels
- The Rutgers Review, a bi-monthly alternative arts and culture magazine

=== Greek life ===
The campus is home to over 80 fraternities and sororities, including African-American, Latino/a, multicultural, and Asian-interest. Several organizations maintain houses for their chapters in the area of Union Street, known locally as "Frat Row", adjacent to the College Avenue Campus. Greek organizations are governed by the Office of Fraternity and Sorority Affairs.

=== Traditions ===
The Grease Trucks were a group of truck-based food vendors located on the College Avenue Campus. They serve traditional grill fare, Middle-Eastern specialties, and are especially well known for serving "Fat Sandwiches", a sub roll containing various ingredients such as cheesesteak, burgers, pork roll, chicken fingers, French fries, mozzarella sticks, eggs, bacon, gyro meat, marinara sauce, etc. The Rutgers Grease Trucks were located in a designated lot for nearly two decades until August 2013. Truck owners were forced to relocate due to the construction of an $84 million student apartment complex. Three trucks remain on the College Avenue Campus, while the remaining two were moved to the Cook/Douglass Campus.

The Dance Marathon is a student-run organization that consists of a year-long series of fundraisers and culminates with the annual Marathon on April 5–6 in the College Avenue Gym. At the Marathon over 400 dancers pledge to raise funds and remain standing for 32 hours without sleeping. The 'Dancers', along with over 500 volunteers and countless visitors, are entertained by live bands, comedians, prize giveaways, games, sports, a mechanical bull, computer and internet access, various theme hours and much more. Rutgers has held this tradition since 1999 and to date has raised in excess of $1.3 million for the Embrace Kids Foundation. In the seventies the Dance Marathon raised funds for the American Cancer Society. In the Eighties it was the Rutger Cancer Research Association.

RutgersFest was a day-long cultural event staged variously on either Livingston Campus or Busch Campus. It was designed to promote college spirit through student organization participation with activities and entertainment throughout the day, culminating with a free concert and fireworks at night. The event was free to all students and guests and was funded as part of an elected programming fee paid by all students as part tuition. Past musical guests have included: Kanye West, Everclear, Sugar Ray, Guster, Goldfinger, Ludacris, Reel Big Fish, Method Man and Redman, Fuel, Third Eye Blind, Hawthorne Heights, NAS, SR-71, Ok Go, N.E.R.D, Pitbull, and more. The event would feature carnival attractions such as bungee bull, bouncy boxing, moon walk, electronic basketball, a recording studio and more. Attendance for the annual event was about 40,000–50,000, topping out at an estimated 65,000 in 2004 at the event which featured Kanye West and Sugar Ray The event was staged by the Rutgers University Programming Association (RUPA), formerly known as the Rutgers College Programming Committee (RCPC), as a year-end celebration before the start of the final examination period.

During its final year in 2011, the festival was held on Busch Campus. Invited musical guests included Yelawolf, Pitbull, and 3OH!3. Several violent incidents that year lead to the indefinite cancellation of the event. President Richard McCormick, in a letter to the Rutgers community, commented: "The problems that occur following RutgersFest have grown beyond our capacity to manage them, and the only responsible course of action is to cancel the event."

== Athletic heritage ==
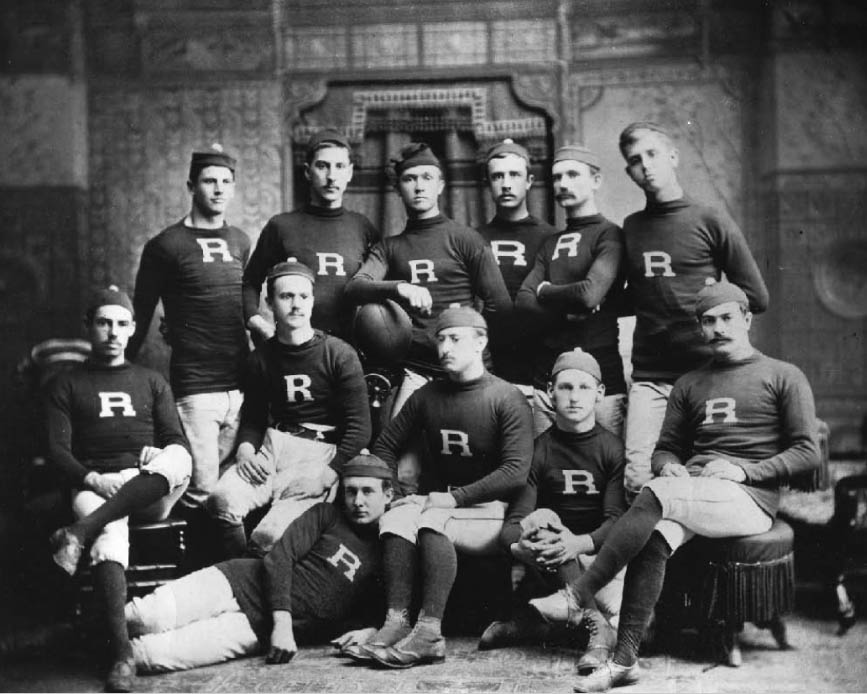
The Rutgers College football team in 1882

Rutgers University is referred to as The Birthplace of College Football as the first intercollegiate football game was held on College Field between Rutgers and Princeton on November 6, 1869, on a plot of ground behind where the present-day College Avenue Gymnasium now stands. Rutgers won the game, by the score of 6 to Princeton's 4.

In 1864, rowing became the first organized sport at Rutgers. Six mile races were held on the Raritan River among six-oared boats. In 1870, Rutgers held its first intercollegiate competition against the Lawrence Scientific School of Harvard. During the following century, Rutgers built a strong men's crew program consisting of both heavyweight and lightweight teams. A women's crew team was added in 1974. In the fall of 2007, men's heavyweight and lightweight crew, along with men's swimming and diving, men's tennis, and men's and women's fencing were cut as NCAA Division I sports by the university administration. The university claimed these changes were due to budget cuts, while others said it was a politically motivated move used to protest funding changes by the state. The university currently has no plans to restore these sports.

== Census-designated-place ==
Rutgers University-Livingston Campus CDP
- Census-designated place
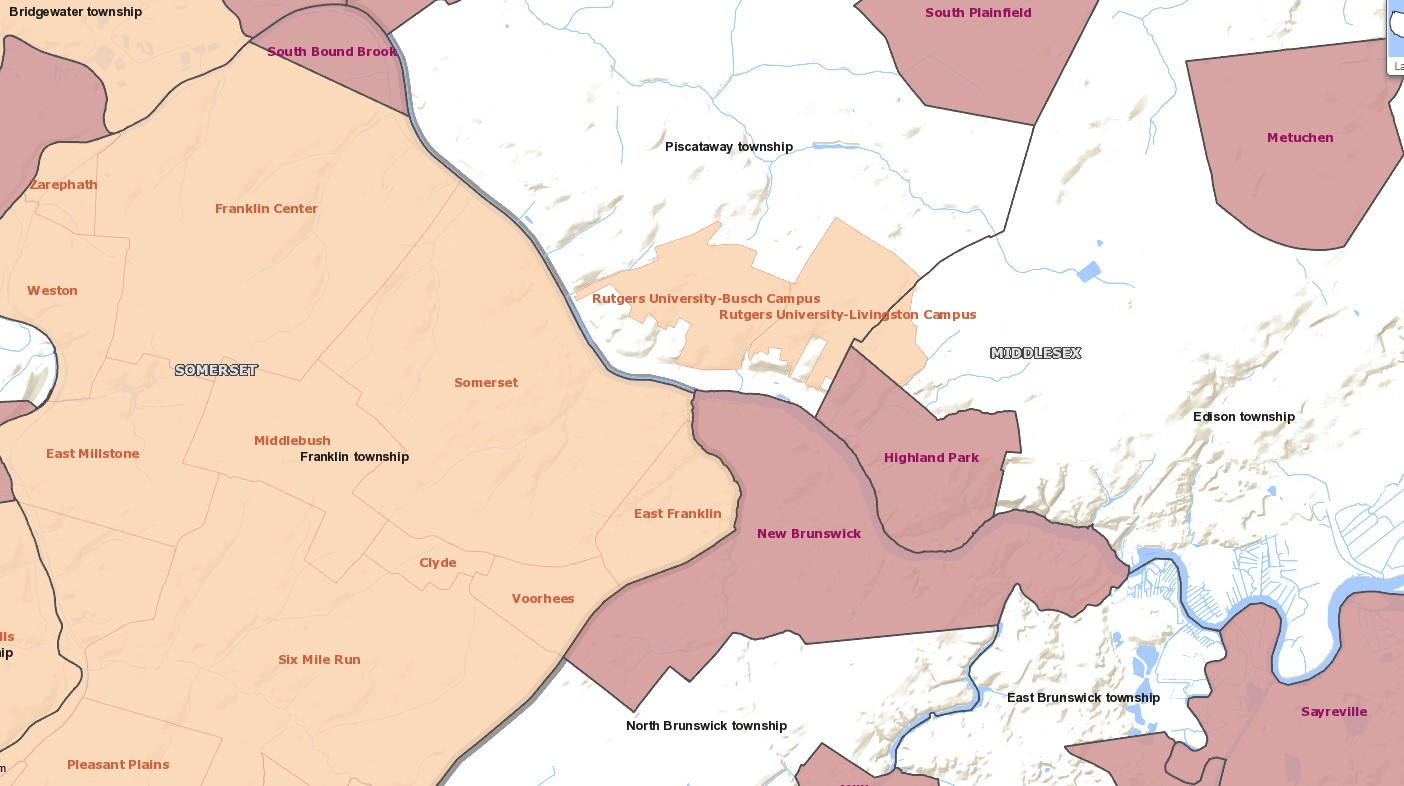

- Location within New Jersey Location within the United States
- Country: United States
- State: New Jersey
- County: Middlesex

Area
  - Total: 1.34 sq mi (3.46 km^{2})
  - Land: 1.34 sq mi (3.46 km^{2})
  - Water: 0 sq mi (0.00 km^{2})
- Elevation: 92 ft (28 m)

Population (2020)
  - Total: 3,545
  - Density: 2,653.9/sq mi (1,024.68/km^{2})
- Time zone: UTC−05:00 (Eastern (EST))
  - Summer (DST): UTC−04:00 (Eastern (EDT))
- FIPS code: 34-65260
- GNIS feature ID: 2806182

Rutgers University-Livingston Campus is a census-designated place (CDP) covering the residential population of the Livingston Campus of Rutgers University in Piscataway and Edison in Middlesex County, New Jersey.

It first appeared as a CDP in the 2020 U.S. census with a population of 3,545.

=== Demographics ===
Historical population
Census	Pop.	Note	%±
2020	3,545		—
U.S. Decennial Census; 2020 2020

==== 2020 census ====
Rutgers University-Livingston Campus CDP, New Jersey – Racial and ethnic composition Note: the US Census treats Hispanic/Latino as an ethnic category. This table excludes Latinos from the racial categories and assigns them to a separate category. Hispanics/Latinos may be of any race.
Race / Ethnicity (NH = Non-Hispanic)	Pop 2020	% 2020
White alone (NH)	911	25.70%
Black or African American alone (NH)	344	9.70%
Native American or Alaska Native alone (NH)	1	0.03%
Asian alone (NH)	1,758	49.59%
Pacific Islander alone (NH)	10	0.28%
Other race alone (NH)	144	4.06%
Mixed race or Multiracial (NH)	13	0.37%
Hispanic or Latino (any race)	364	10.27%
Total	3,545	100.00%

See also main page of Rutgers University in the notable people section.

== See also ==
- List of American state universities
