= Urban coyote =

Wild animal in North American cities

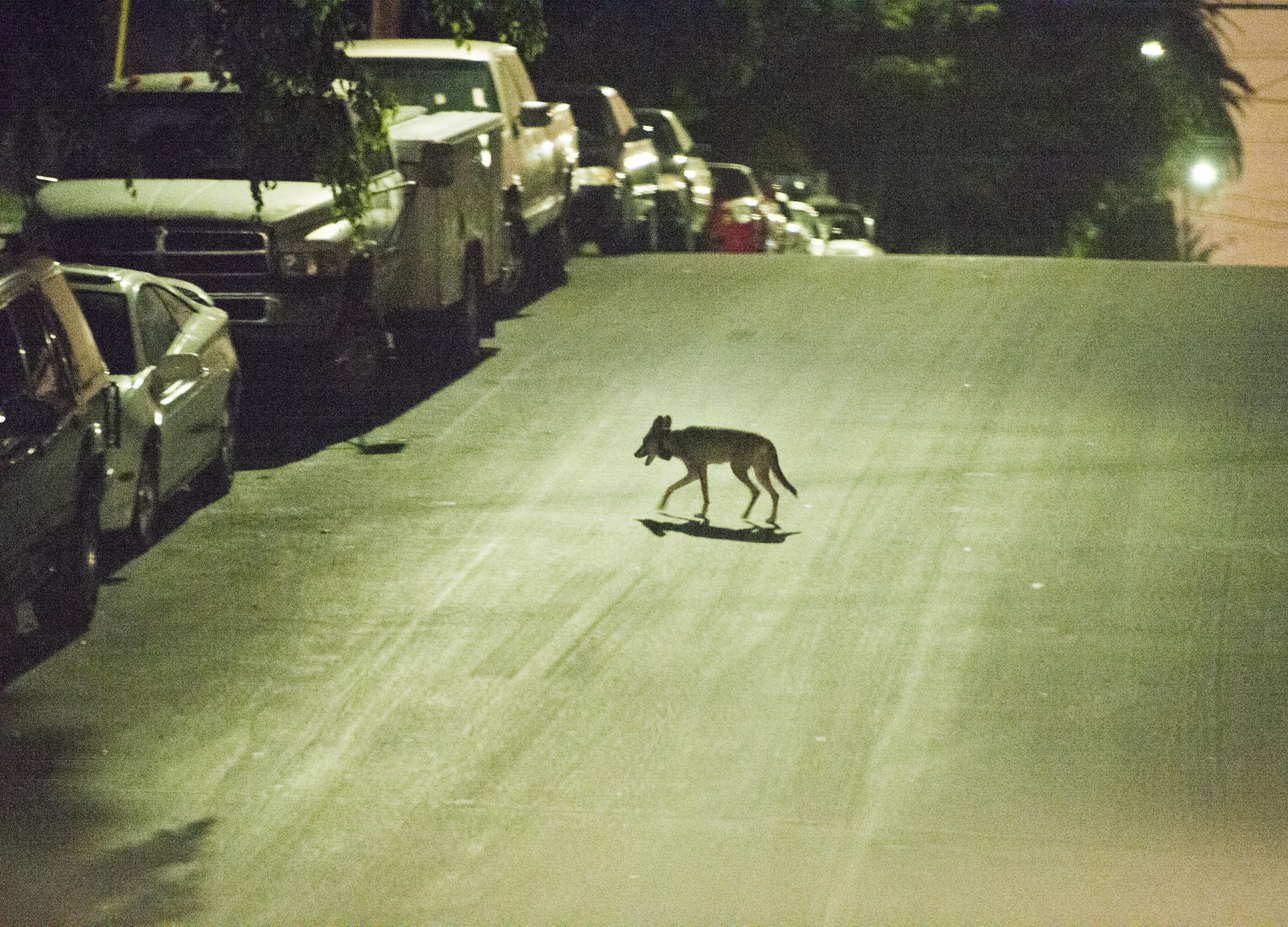
A coyote crossing the street in the Westlake neighborhood of Los Angeles, California

Urban coyotes are coyotes that reside in North American metropolitan areas (major cities and their suburbs). Coyotes thrive in suburban settings and urban regions because of the availability of food and the lack of predators. One report described them as "thriving" in U.S. cities, and a 2013 report in The Economist suggested that urban coyotes were increasingly living in cities and suburbs.

== Adaptations to urban environments ==
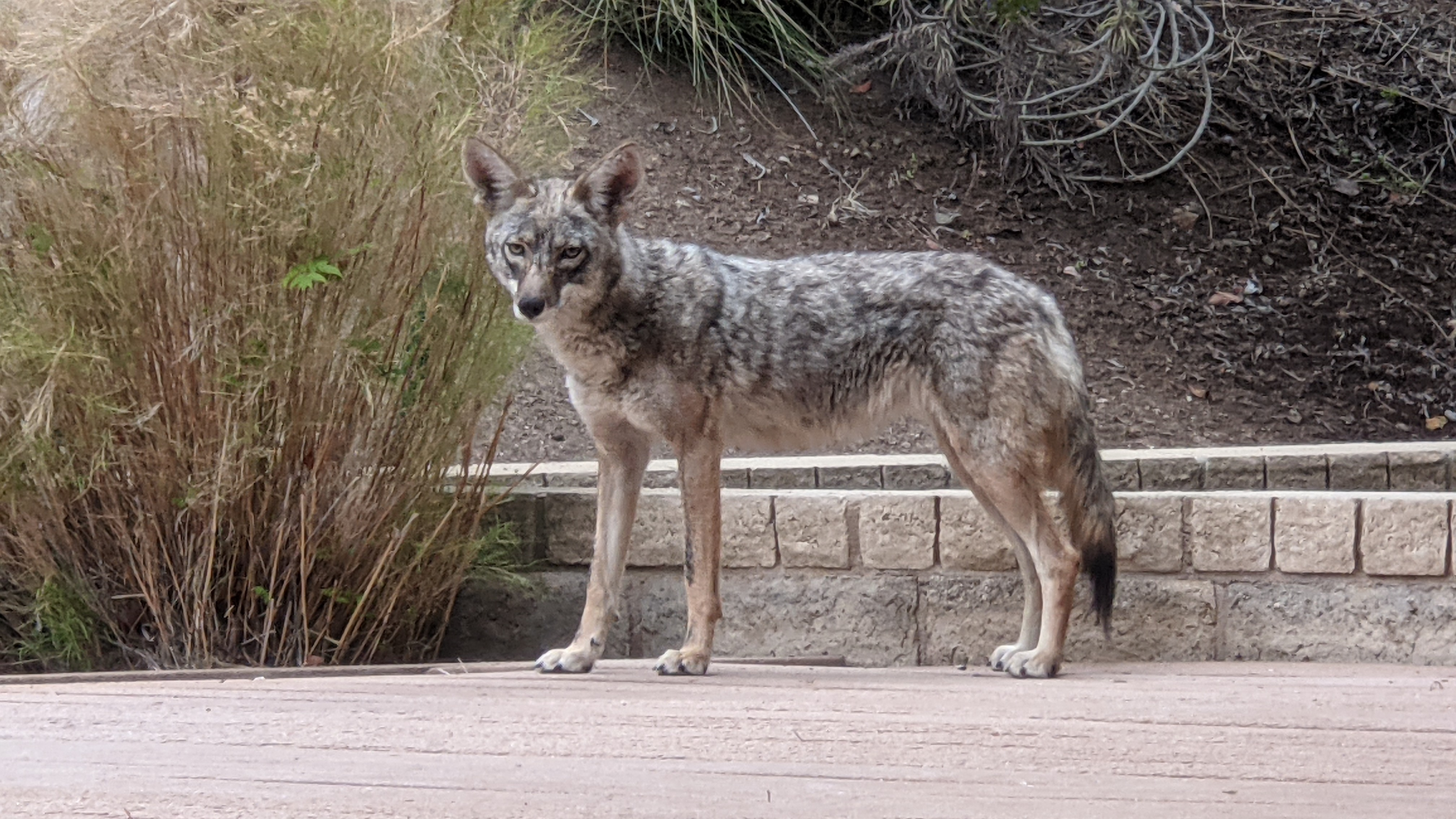
Coyote in a suburban Thousand Oaks, California, backyard

Wildlife ecologists at Ohio State University studied coyotes living in Chicago over a seven-year period (2000–2007) and found that coyotes have adapted well to living in densely populated urban environments while avoiding contact with humans. They found that urban coyotes tend to live longer than their rural counterparts, kill rodents and small pets, and live anywhere from parks to industrial areas. The researchers estimated that there are up to 2,000 coyotes living in the Chicago metropolitan area and that this circumstance may well apply to many other urban areas in North America.

In Washington, D.C.'s Rock Creek Park, coyotes den and raise their young, scavenge roadkill, and hunt rodents. "I don't see it as a bad thing for a park," the assigned National Park Service biologist told a reporter for Smithsonian Magazine. "I see it as good for keeping animal populations in control, like the squirrels and the mice."

Unlike rural coyotes, urban ones have a longer lifespan and tend to live in higher densities but rarely attack humans and can be frightened away by arm waving or loud noises. The animals generally are nocturnal and prey upon rabbits, rats, Canada geese, fruit, insects and family pets, especially small dogs and domestic cats. Analysis of urban coyote scat found that the most common food source of Southern California coyotes came from anthropogenic sources, namely edible plantings cultivated by humans (particularly figs, palm fruit and grapes), litter/refuse, and domestic cats. They also consumed gophers, ground squirrels (but rarely rats or mice), rabbits and birds. Meanwhile, the diet of suburban coyotes included a much higher proportion of native mammals, primarily rabbits. Urban coyotes in Southern California have a lower genetic diversity than their suburban counterparts. Urbanization also leads to reduced gene flow between adjacent populations.

Coyotes in all Canadian provinces can be attracted to food left out for birds, or prey upon stray cats, and tend to live between apartment buildings and in industrial parks throughout major cities from Vancouver through Toronto and all the way to St. John's.

"We rarely think about storm drains, power line rights of way, or railroad tracks, but these are coyote highways, linking one habitat to another," note the authors of Wild L.A.: Explore the Amazing Nature in and Around Los Angeles.

One study in Tucson, Arizona found that urban coyotes had similar antibodies and pathogens to coyotes in general, and had a survival rate in the city of 72% for any given year, on average. A study in 2007 suggested that coyotes were "successful in adjusting to an urbanized landscape" with high survival rates, and are frequently in "close proximity" to people.

Both studies suggested that a major cause of deaths of urban coyotes was collisions with motorized vehicles.

== Species interactions and human conflict ==
Urban coyotes have more to their diet than rural coyotes, such as trash, pets, and human grown fruit. In the city, animals hunted by coyotes are often the same animals they would hunt in the wild, mostly birds and small mammals. Nevertheless, anthropogenic sources constitute a large proportion of the diet of an urban coyote.

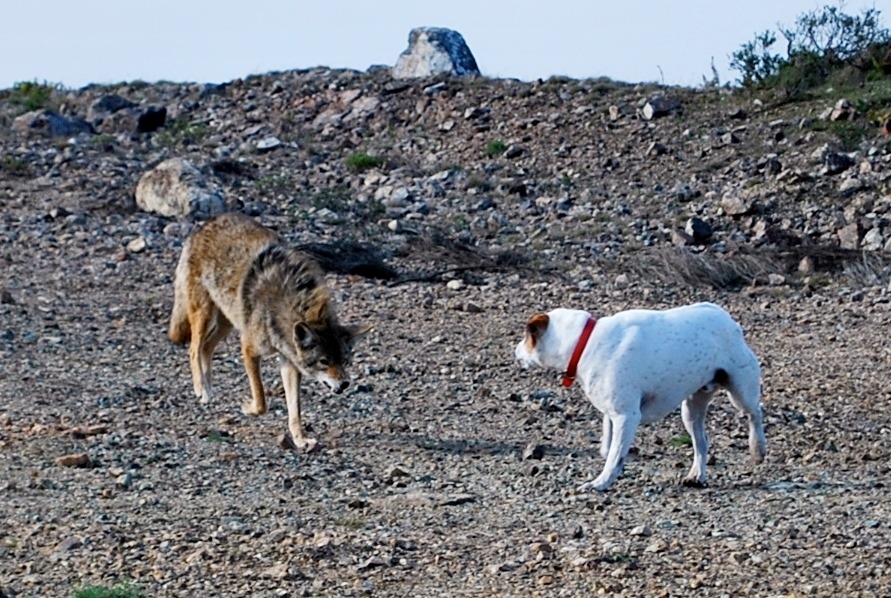
A coyote in an encounter with a rescue dog

Coyotes serve as a significant predator towards pets, particularly domestic cats, and rarely small dogs. Based on a study in the United States, density can also have a significant impact on these interactions: Humans and their pets are more likely to come into conflict with coyotes the bigger their home city is.

Though attacks on humans are rare, urban coyotes are among the large carnivores known to prey on humans. There have been two recorded human fatalities attributed to coyote attacks in North America, including that of Taylor Mitchell in 2009 at Cape Breton Highlands National Park. Outside of predatory attacks, coyotes are most likely to attack people when provoked or are more dependent on the food scraps humans leave behind.

== Management ==
A researcher studying the impact of coyotes in the city of Austin, Texas found that urban coyote management techniques, including steps to trap and remove coyotes who were exhibiting bold or aggressive behavior, as well as efforts to educate the public about not feeding the animals, had had a positive effect in lessening possible risk to humans or to pets. Urban coyotes are more bold and exploratory than suburban coyotes. These traits are believed to be caused by positive interactions with urban human populations in the past several decades.

Though lethal control is heavily supported in Greenwood Village, Colorado, the entire public doesn’t view all urban coyotes as a pest to be killed. The public perception on urban coyotes is split between a dangerous predator or an animal that humans can coexist with.

California and Vermont ban coyote hunting contests.

In order to ensure that urban coyotes remain afraid of humans, Edmonton, Canada announced that volunteers would "make a ruckus" if coyotes do not run away when initially approached.

In addition, researchers found that owners keeping the pets indoors during times where coyotes are most active reduces the risk of coyotes hunting them.

== Individual animals ==
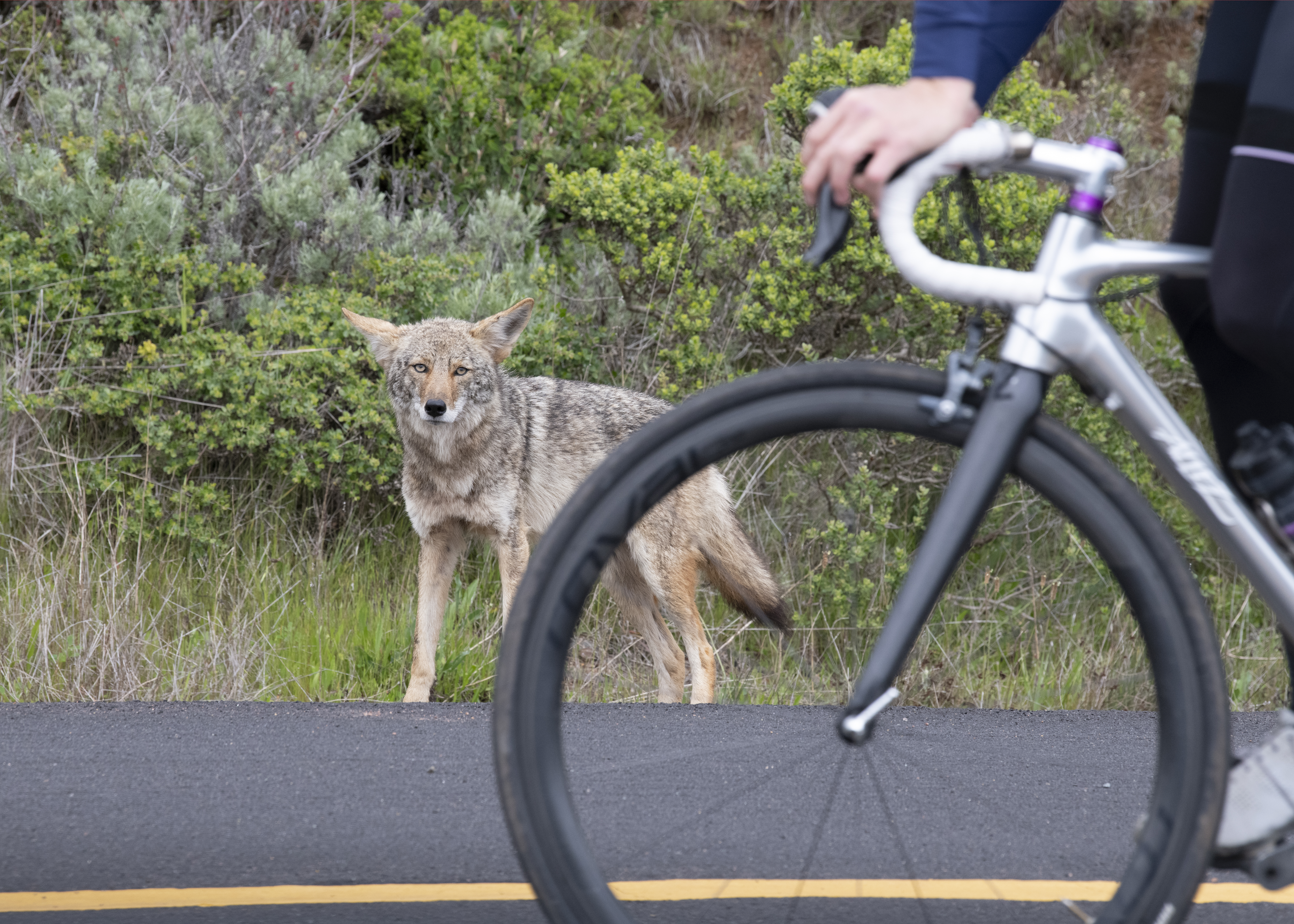
Coyotes are a common sight in major urban parks in Canada and the U.S.

A coyote nicknamed "Hal" made his way to New York City's Central Park in March 2006, wandering about the park for at least two days before being captured by officials. New York City parks commissioner Adrian Benepe noted this coyote had to be very adventurous and curious to get so far into the city. In 2015, there were reports of coyotes howling at night in Central Park.

An incident occurred in April 2007 in the Chicago Loop district, where a coyote, later nicknamed "Adrian", quietly entered a Quiznos restaurant during the lunch hours; he was later captured and released at a wildlife rehabilitation center near Barrington, Illinois. In February 2010, up to three coyotes were spotted on the Columbia University campus in New York City, and another coyote sighting occurred in Central Park. Up to ten coyotes have also been living and breeding in San Francisco's Golden Gate Park.

The first successful coyote den reported on Long Island was recorded in May 2016. The Port Authority of New York attempted to relocate that coyote family in August of the same year as the coyotes had become too friendly and people were attempting to feed them. The Port Authority was unsuccessful in relocating the coyote family and eventually the USDA Wildlife services euthanized all but one.

== See also ==
- Mountain lions in the Santa Monica Mountains
- Street dog
- Urban red fox
