= Rutgers Ecological Preserve =

University nature teaching area and park

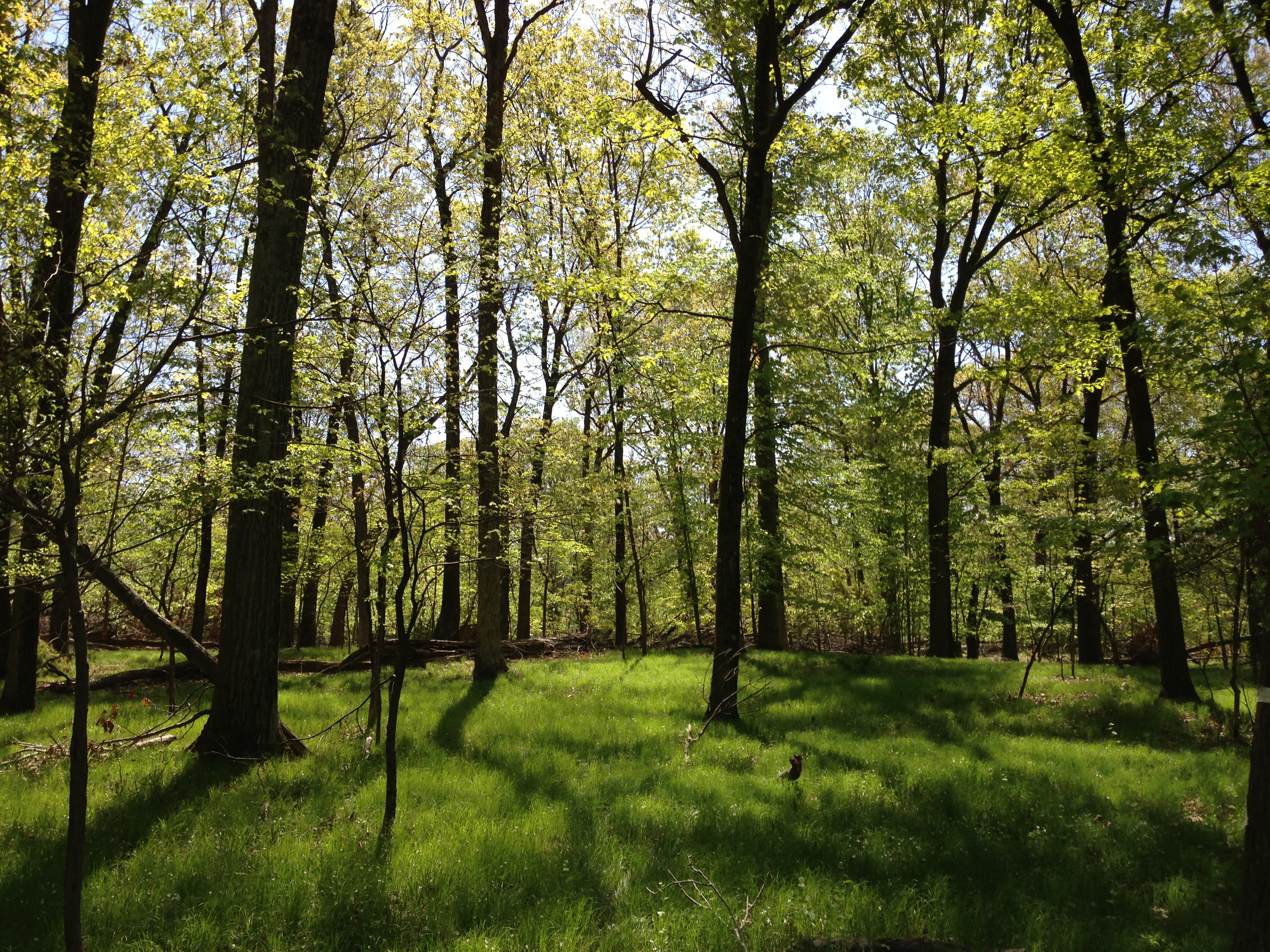
- Rutgers Ecological Preserve

- Location within New Jersey
- Coordinates: 40.5241°N 74.4564°W
- Owner: Rutgers University

The Rutgers University Ecological Preserve (RUEP), previously known as Kilmer Woods, is a nature teaching area owned by Rutgers University. This 370 acres (1.5 km^{2}) tract of land is part of the Livingston Campus of Rutgers and is located within the towns of Piscataway, Edison, and Highland Park in Middlesex County, New Jersey. It contains a wide variety of plant life and supports a range of wood dwelling creatures. It provides fresh water to the Raritan River, hosts wildlife (turkeys, woodpeckers, salamanders, foxes, etc.), and provides recreational value for hikers and bikers.

== History ==
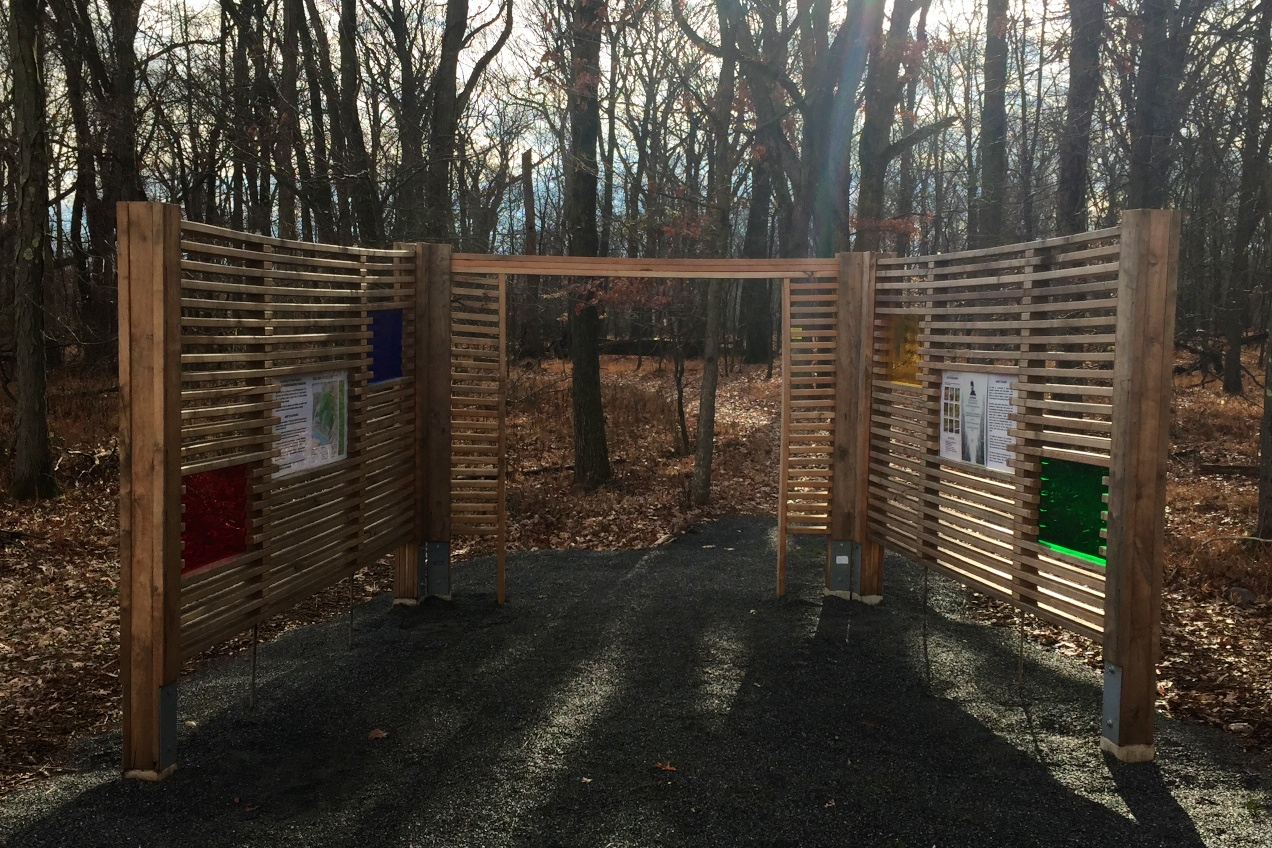
Gateway Kiosk

The preserve lands were used for camp by troops during the Revolutionary War. In 1800s, most of the land was used for farming and handling livestock. After Rutgers University acquired all the lands, the preserve was established in 1976 by the Rutgers Board of Governors in order to preserve the nature and provide a teaching area for its students. In November, 2014, a new gateway kiosk was dedicated to the memory of Charlie Kontos, Jr.

== Activities ==
The RUEP is a popular place for hikers and mountain bikers in the central NJ area, especially Rutgers students. It contains challenging terrain that is very close to campus.

== Maps of the RUEP ==
- Most recent trail map (Updated 8/15/2014) provided by Rutgers University
- Historic Trail Map Provided by Highland Park Environmental Commission
Panoramic photograph of the orange trail in the Rutgers Ecological Preserve as it crosses Buell Brook
