= Do not feed the animals =

Policy regarding wildlife

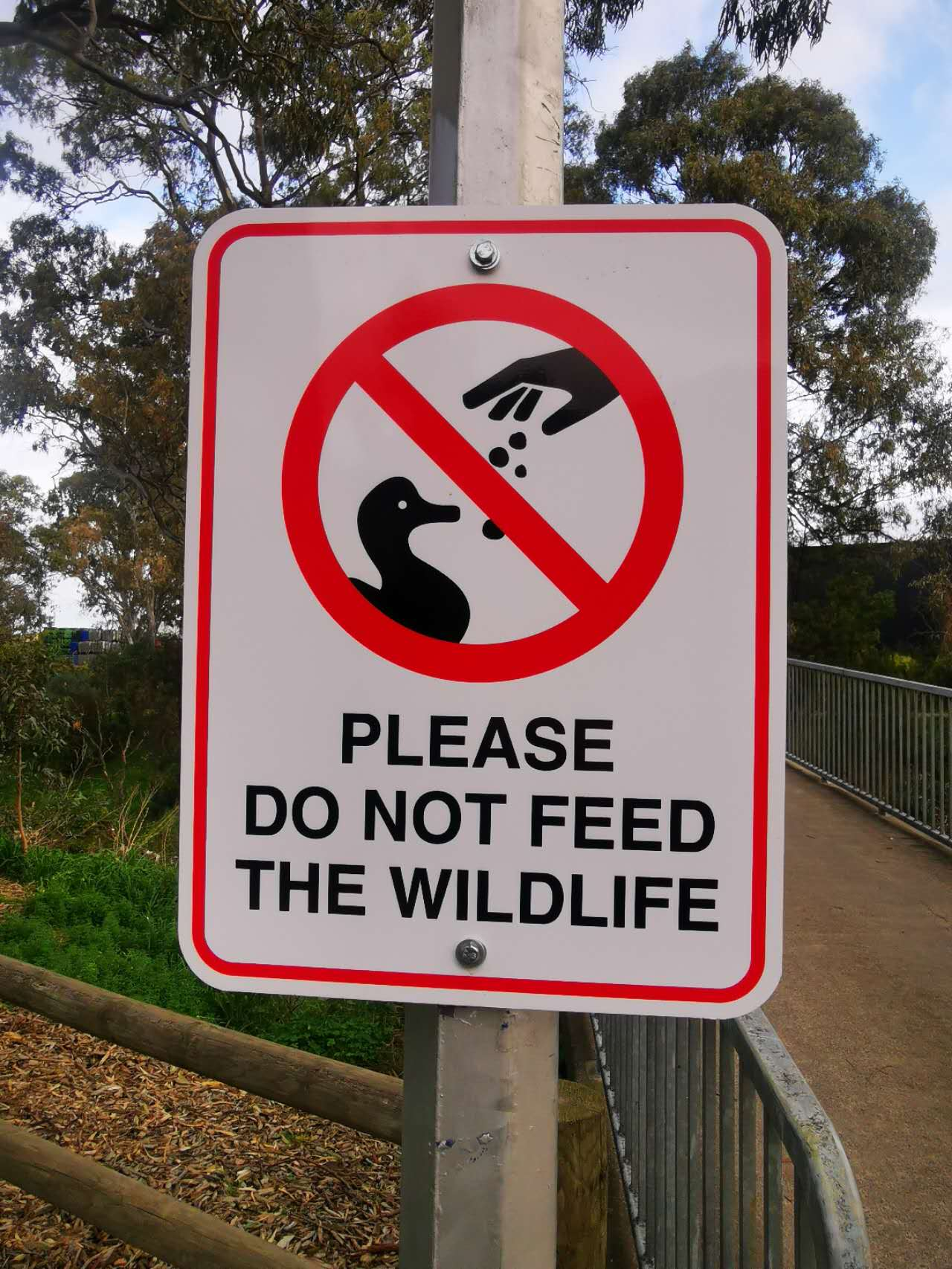
Sign in Australia discouraging locals against feeding urban wildlife

The prohibition "do not feed the animals" reflects a policy forbidding the artificial feeding of wild or feral animals. Signs displaying this message are commonly found in zoos, circuses, animal theme parks, aquariums, national parks, parks, public spaces, farms, and other places where people come into contact with wildlife. In some cases there are laws to enforce such no-feeding policies.

Feeding wild animals can significantly change their behavior. Feeding or leaving unattended food to large animals, such as bears, can lead them to aggressively seek out food from people, sometimes resulting in injury. Feeding can also alter animal behavior so that animals routinely travel in larger groups, which can make disease transmission between animals more likely. In public spaces, the congregation of animals caused by feeding can result in them being considered pests. Food given to animals may not be healthy for them; artificial feeding can result in, for example, vitamin deficiencies and dietary mineral deficiencies; zoos have strict dietary controls in place for animals. Outside zoos, a concern is that the increase in local concentrated wildlife population due to artificial feeding can promote the transfer of disease among animals or between animals and humans.

== By location ==
=== National and state parks ===
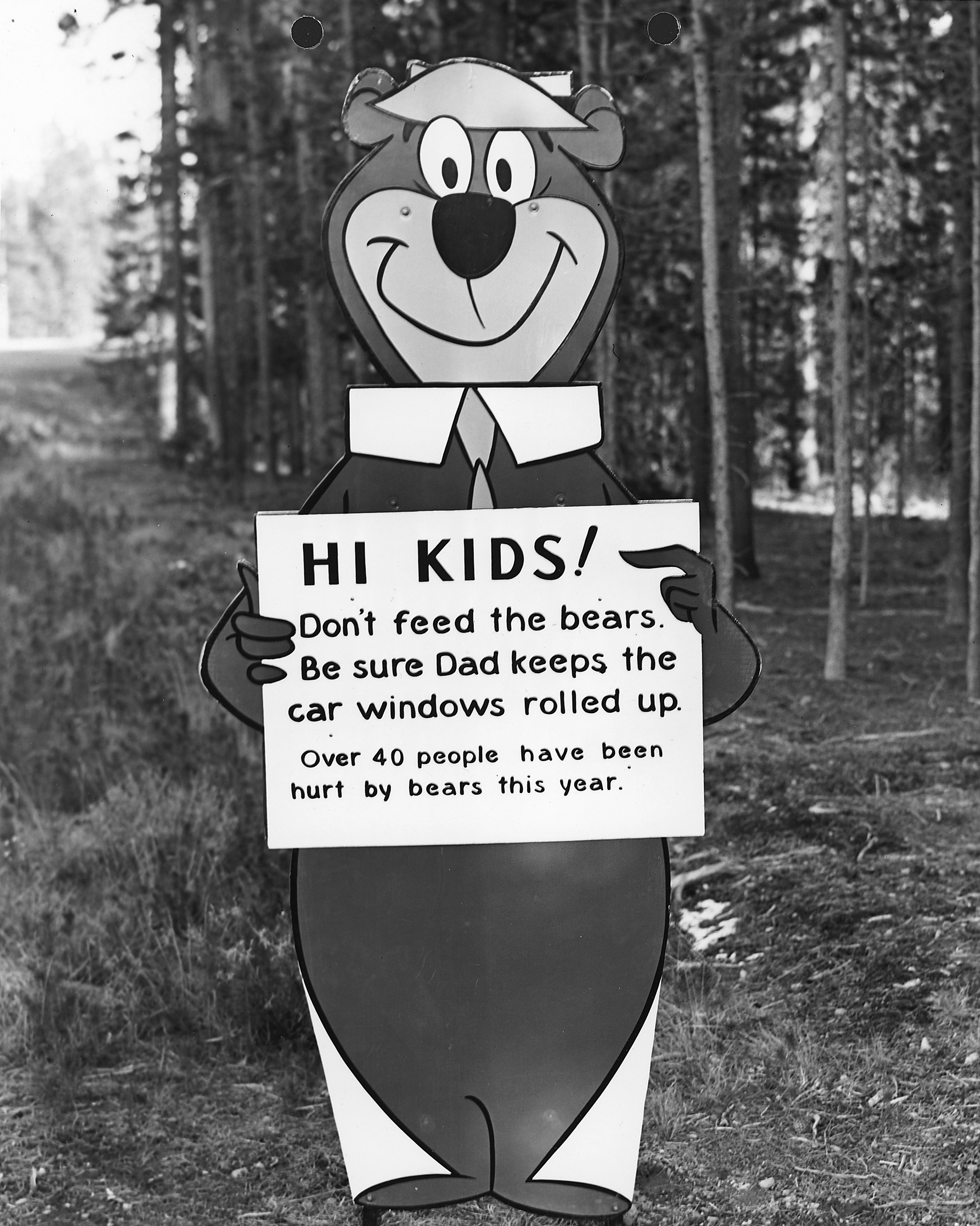
In the 1960s, US national parks began to discourage the feeding of bears, as reflected in this photograph from 1961, featuring Yogi Bear.

In national parks and state parks, feeding animals can result in malnourishment due to inappropriate diet and in disruption of natural hunting or food-gathering behavior. It can also be dangerous to the people doing the feeding.

In the US, early 20th century park management actually encouraged animal feeding. For example, "the feeding of squirrels had been seen as a way to civilize the parks and rechannel the energies of young boys from aggression and vandalism toward compassion and charity." Park rangers once fed bears in front of crowds of tourists. However, with a greater awareness of ecological and other issues, such pro-feeding policies are now viewed as detrimental, and US national parks now actively discourage animal feeding.

In Canadian national parks, it is illegal to disturb or feed wildlife, and Parks Canada advises visitors not to leave out "food attractants" such as dirty dishes. Road salt and roadkill may also act as food attractants, and removing roadkill is considered good park management.

=== Marine parks ===
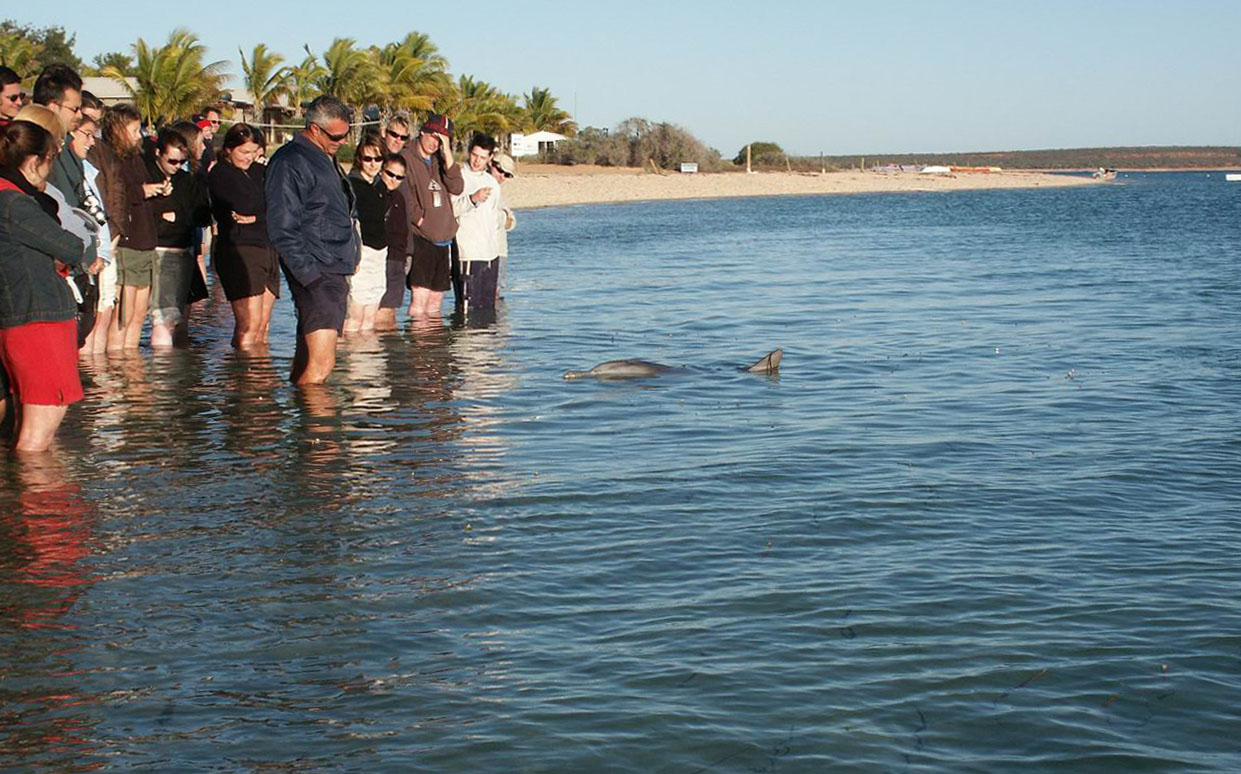
At Monkey Mia nature reserve in Australia, dolphins are fed under ranger supervision.

Tourism operators often provide food to attract marine wildlife such as sharks to areas where they can be more easily viewed. Such a practice is controversial, however, because it can create a dependency on artificial feeding, habituate animals to feeding locations, increase inter-species and intra-species aggression, and increase the spread of disease. In Australia's Great Barrier Reef Marine Park, shark feeding is prohibited. In Hawaiian waters, shark feeding is permitted only in connection with traditional Hawaiian cultural or religious activities.

The feeding of wild dolphins for tourist purposes is also controversial, and is prohibited in the US because it can alter natural hunting behaviour, disrupt social interaction, encourage the dolphins to approach or ingest dangerous objects, and endanger the person doing the feeding. At Monkey Mia in Western Australia, dolphin feeding is permitted under Department of Environment and Conservation supervision.

=== Zoos ===
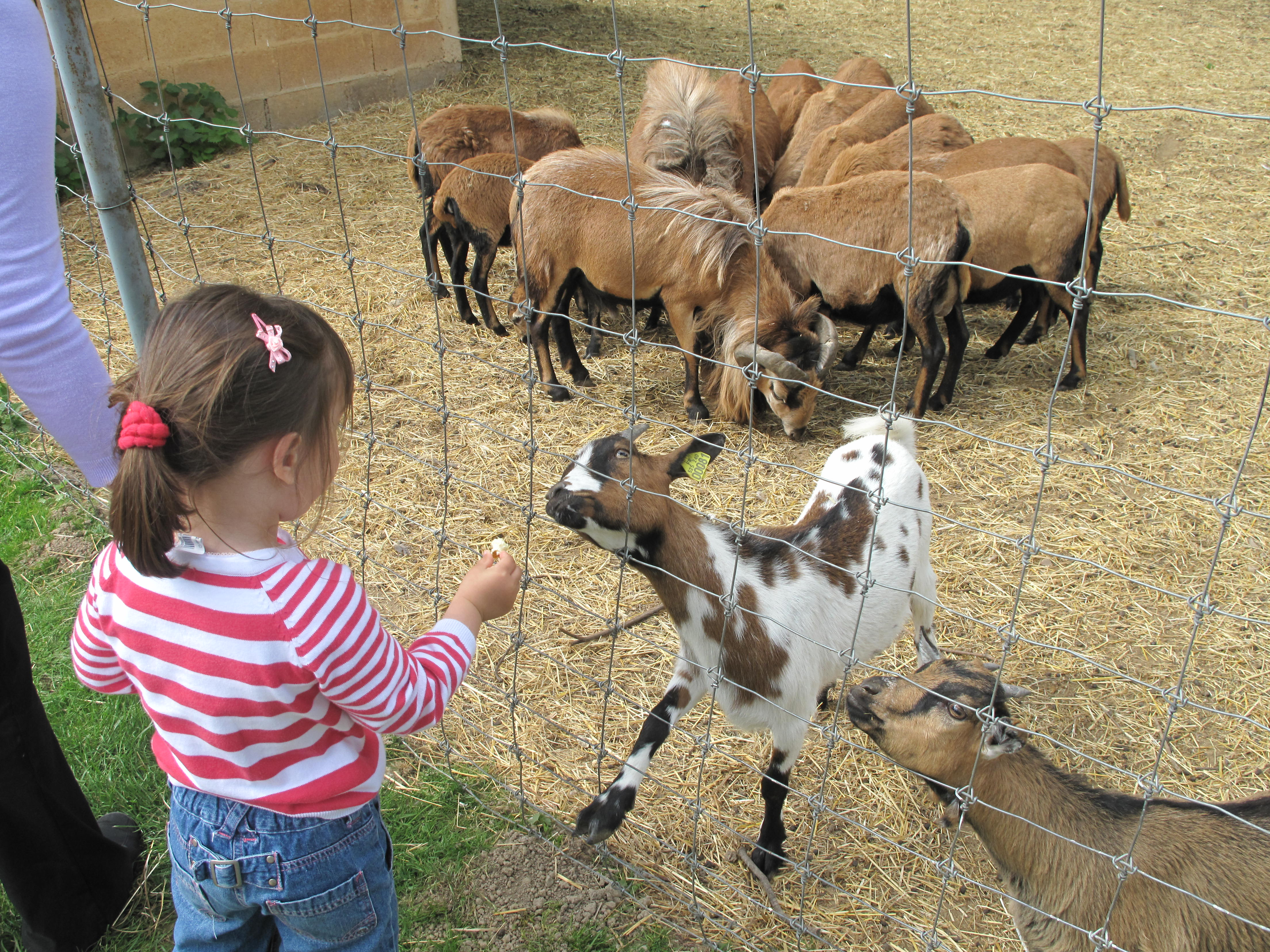
Where zoos permit visitors to feed animals, it is usually domestic animals such as sheep and goats, as in this French zoo.

Zoos generally discourage visitors from giving any food to the animals. Some zoos, particularly petting zoos, do the opposite and actively encourage people to get involved with the feeding of the animals. This, however, is strictly monitored and usually involves set food available from the zookeepers or vending machines, as well as a careful choice of which animals to feed, and the provision of hand-washing facilities to avoid spreading disease. Domestic animals such as sheep and goats are often permitted to be fed, as are giraffes.

=== Public spaces ===
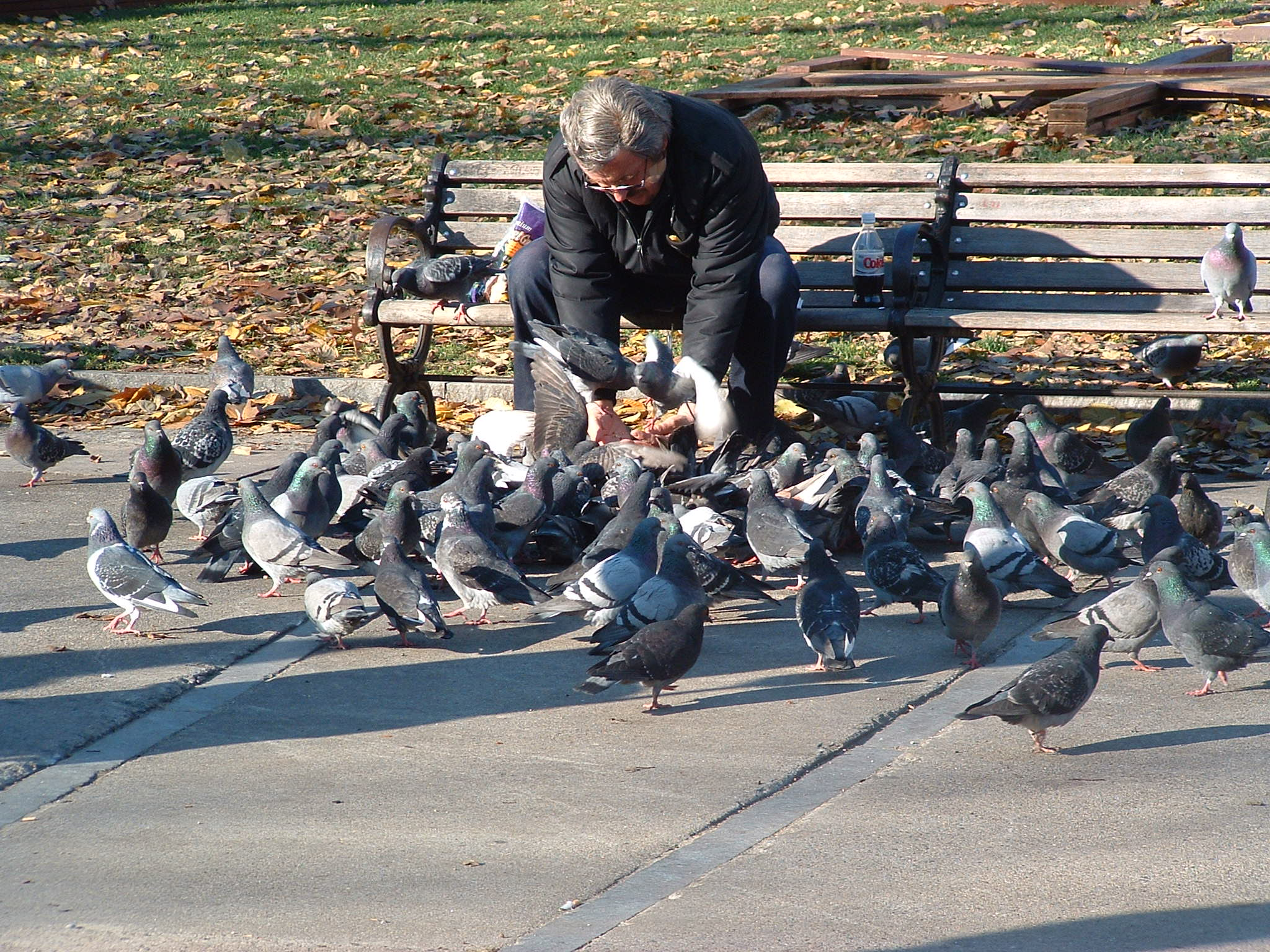
Feral pigeons being fed in a public space

Feral pigeons are often found in urban public spaces. They are often considered environmental pests, and can transmit diseases such as psittacosis. Deliberate feeding of feral pigeons, though popular, contributes to these problems.

Ducks are also commonly fed in public spaces. In an early 1970s US study, 67% of people visiting urban parks did so to feed ducks. However, such feeding may contribute to water pollution and to over-population of the birds, as well as delaying winter migration to an extent that may be dangerous for the birds. Feeding foods such as white bread to ducks and geese can result in bone deformities. Like pigeons, ducks may also congregate in large numbers where feeding takes place, resulting in aggression towards humans who do not have food to hand as well as towards other individuals in the group. Ducks can also be messy animals, and the cleanup of an area where they congregate is time-consuming.

=== Backyards ===
Similar issues to those in national and state parks also apply in suburban and rural backyards. Artificial feeding of coyotes, deer, and other wildlife is discouraged. Feeding deer, for example, may contribute to the spread of bovine tuberculosis. The feeding of birds with bird feeders is an exception, at least in the US, even though it can sometimes contribute to spreading disease. In Australia, artificial bird feeding is viewed more negatively. Instead, growing native plants that can act as a natural food source for birds is recommended. Similar suggestions have been made in the US.

== Traditions of feeding the animals ==
Some people oppose such laws claiming that animals such as pigeons can be an amenity for people who do not have company such as friends or family, and say that the laws prohibiting feeding animals in urban places must change. In some countries, such as Greece, feeding the pigeons in cities is a widespread practice. Cultural hostility to feeding animals in cities and laws that ban the practice raise concerns about how humans relate to other living beings in the urban environment. In some areas, feeding animals in a sustainable manner has been encouraged, as without supplementation of food from humans in addition to their natural supply, some animals, especially waterfowl such as ducks, geese and swans, have become malnourished and underweight.

Politicians have also protested laws that ban feeding feral pigeons in cities. Feral pigeons in cities existed for thousands of years but only recently in some countries humans started seeing them as a nuisance and became hostile to them. In India, feeding feral animals in cities is considered a noble act. Academicians say that how humans treat animals is related to how humans treat each other and thus raise concerns about the cultural shift from seeing feral city pigeons as harmless in the 1800s to seeing them an undesirable in some countries in the 2000s.

== Sign gallery ==
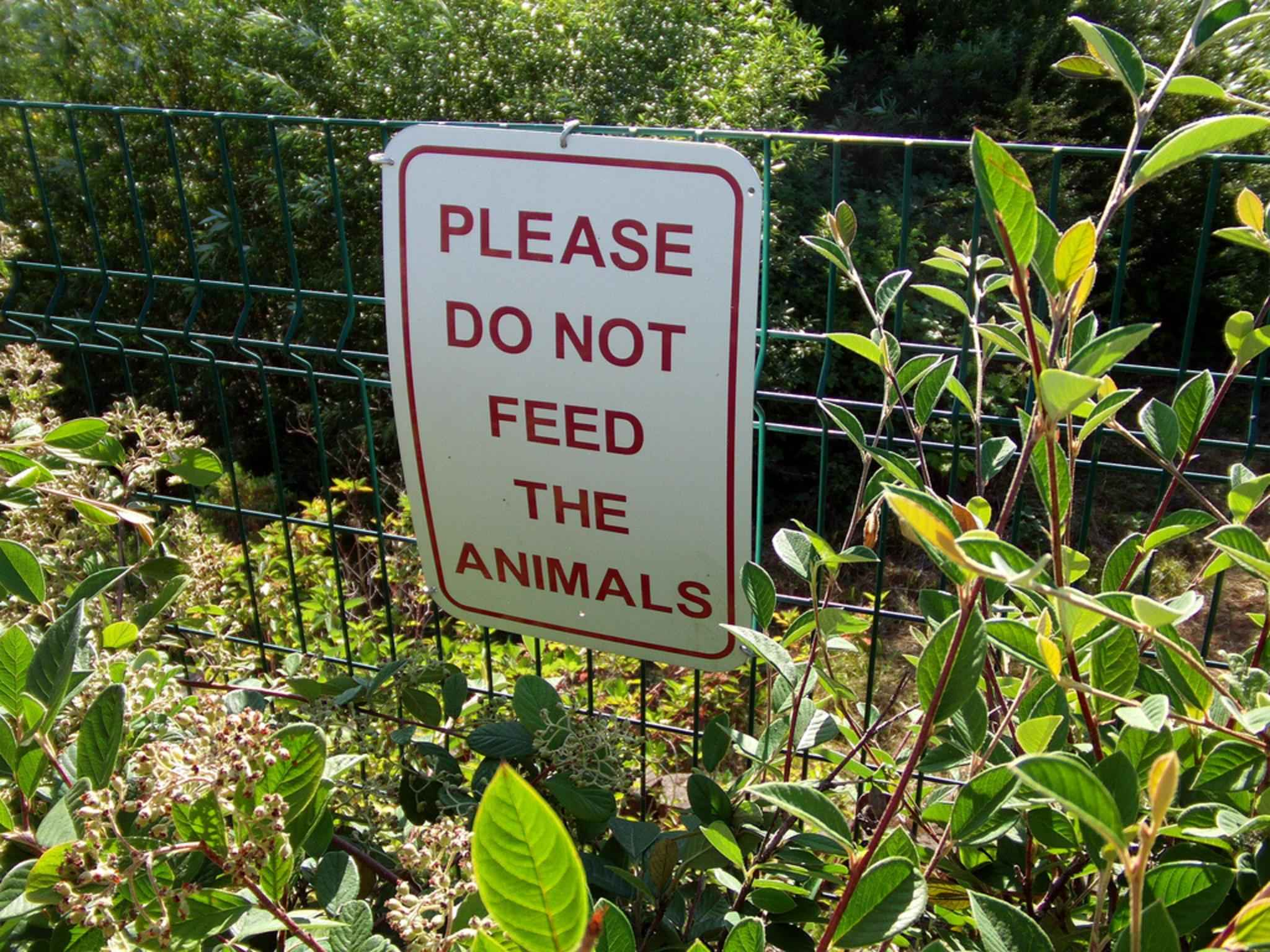
Signs such as this are used to emphasize a no-feeding policy

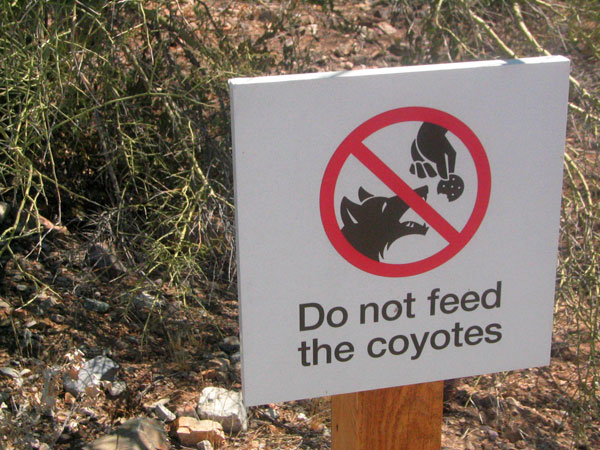
This sign discourages feeding coyotes, which can result in aggressive behavior toward humans

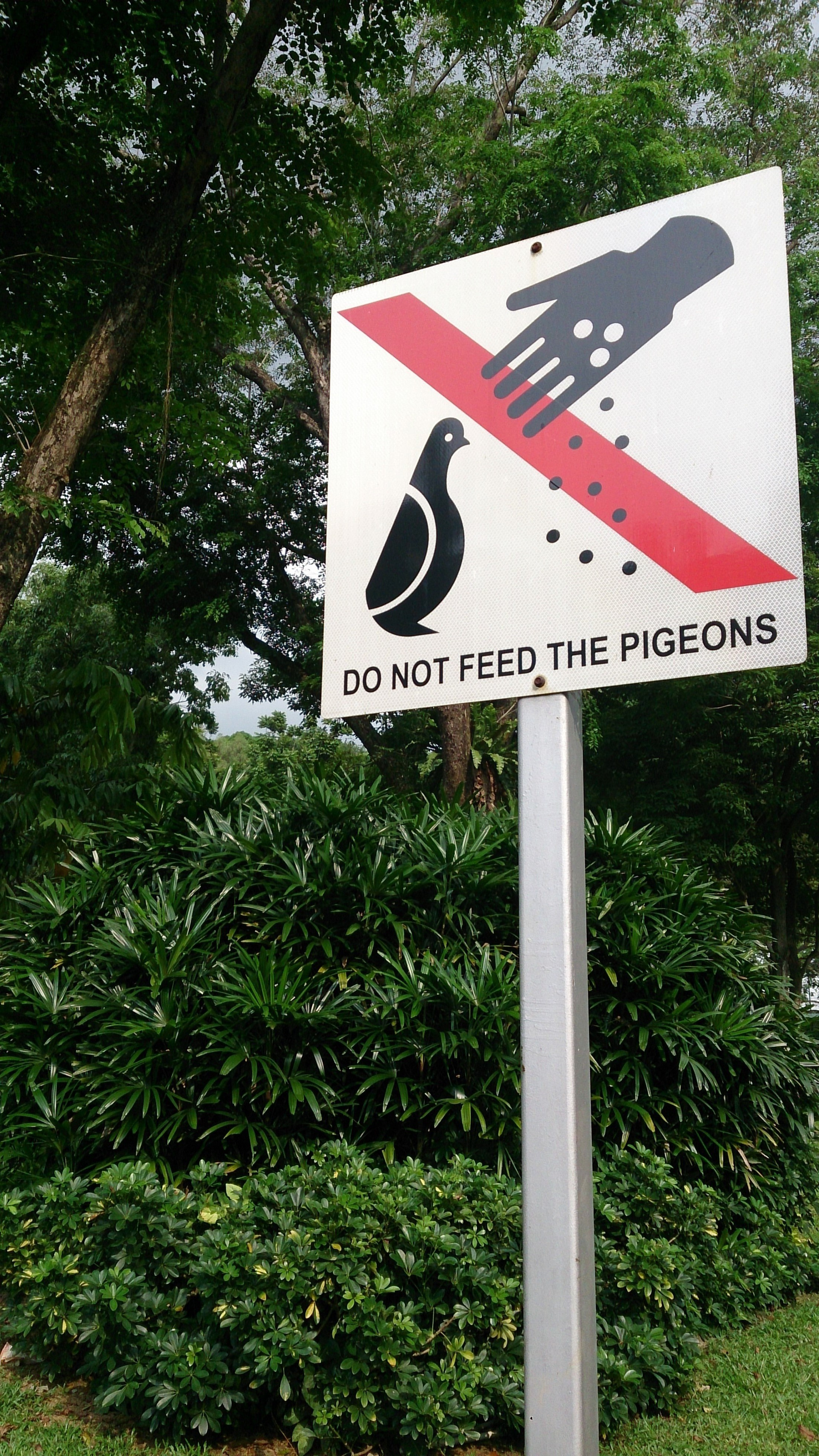
Sign in Singapore telling people not to feed the pigeons

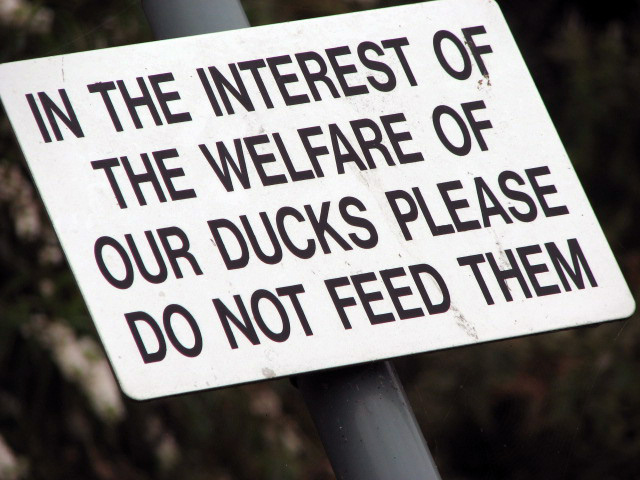
Sign telling citizens to not feed the ducks

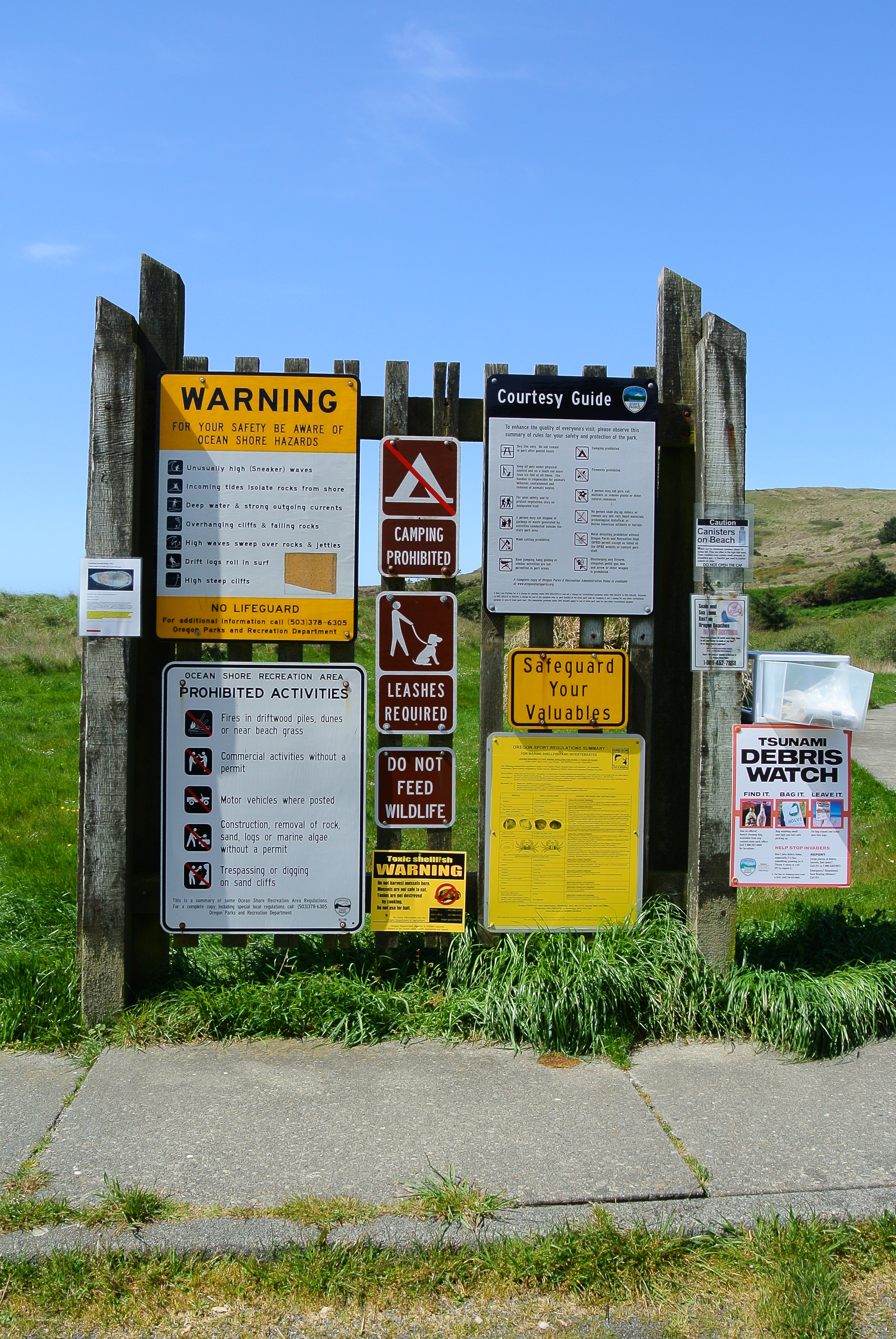
Prohibited activities and safety instructions at a state park in Oregon

== See also ==
- Protected area
