= Synurbization =

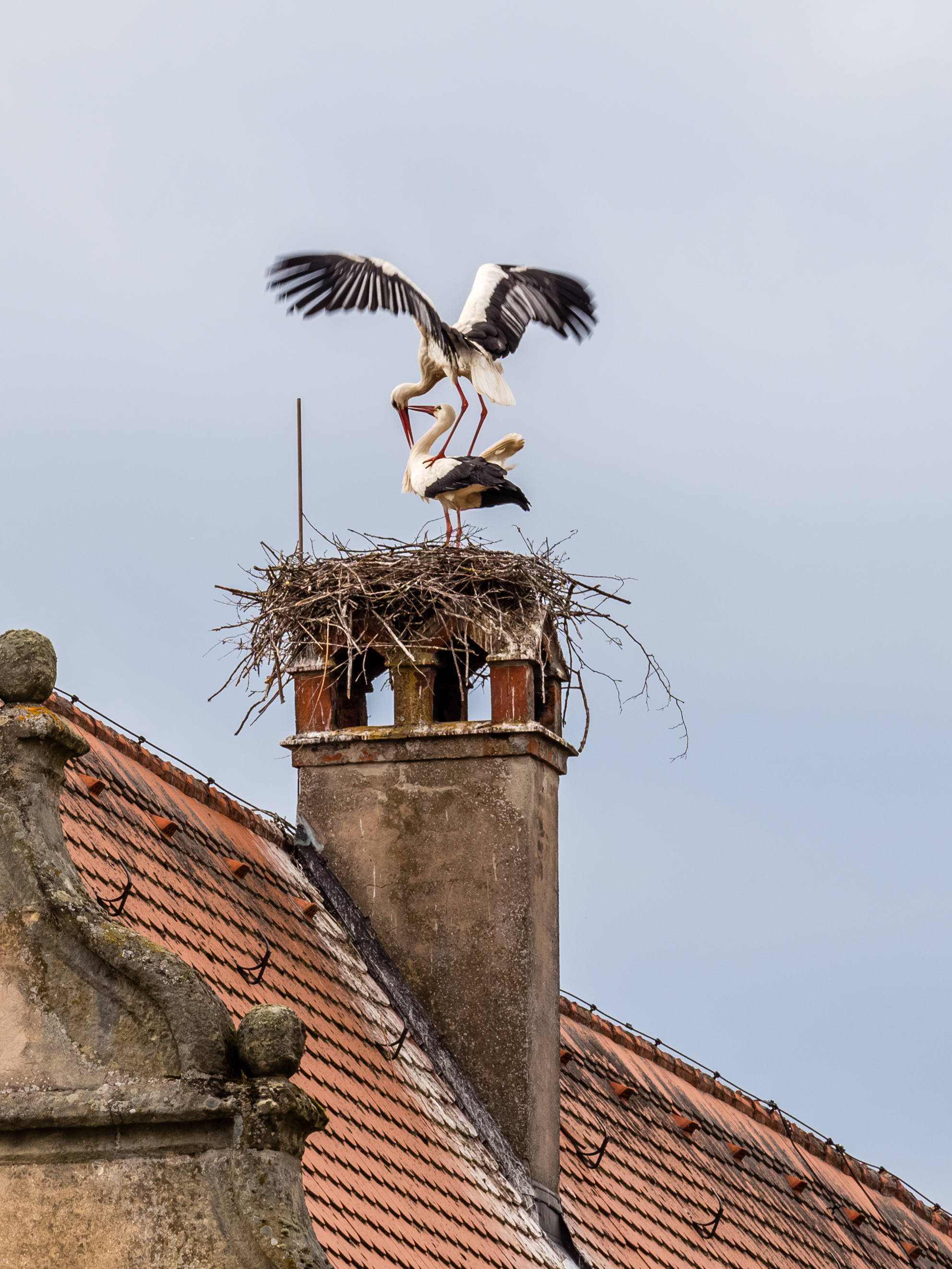
Changes in behavior, such as nesting changes.

Synurbization refers to the adaptation of wildlife to the unique conditions presented by urbanized environments, with a focus on how synurbic populations differ behaviorally, physiologically, and ecologically from populations of the same species living in their natural environments. Urbanization, in terms of ecology, is the process by which natural landscapes are transformed into built environments through human development and intervention, leading to altered environmental conditions and ecological dynamics within the area. Synurbization may occur as a response to the encroachment of cities into the existing habitats of wildlife, or through the colonization and expansion of wildlife into urban environments. These adaptations are necessary for the survival of the population, as individuals possessing advantageous variations in traits or greater behavioral flexibility ultimately have higher fitness in these urbanized settings. However, while some of the behavioral adaptations are favorable for the species and allow them to persist, some may have a negative impact on the species, and the broader consequences that stem from urbanization can negatively affect both wildlife and humans.

== Changes in behavior ==
When compared to members of their species that live in natural environments, urban-dwelling populations exhibit clear behavioral differences, collectively described as "urban wildlife syndrome" since the changes are not exclusive to one species, but rather are a pattern of behaviors that have been observed across multiple taxa due to the similar conditions and selective pressures that urban environments across the world present.

Urbanization transforms ecological conditions where animals live due to habitat fragmentation, human proximity, and attraction to anthropogenic foods that change selective forces. For instance, with small mammals, striped field mice urban-inhabiting are bolder, more exploratory, and phenotypically plastic than their rural counterparts. They adapt to anthropogenic shelters, foods, and novel ecosystems from their tolerance of human-modified environments, the colonization of bolder mice, and urban-specific trait selection. White-footed mice adapted through behavioral and genetic changes also exist in fragmented, urban parks, and while they require more plasticity in response to urban predation patterns, adaptability promotes success within these fragmented patches. Birds like the noisy miner have been observed conducting innovative behaviors (i.e., opening sugar packets) that mirror those of small mammals and other birds in the same urban setting, yet taxonomic differences exist in the response to the challenges of novel habitats. Urbanized ecosystems act as a filter for which species can be innovative, adaptable, and risk-prone; urbanized small mammals and other species can flourish more than other species due to social learning and temporal-spatial adaptability, suggesting more of an ability to navigate the changes humans implement in their ecosystems.

=== Population density increase ===
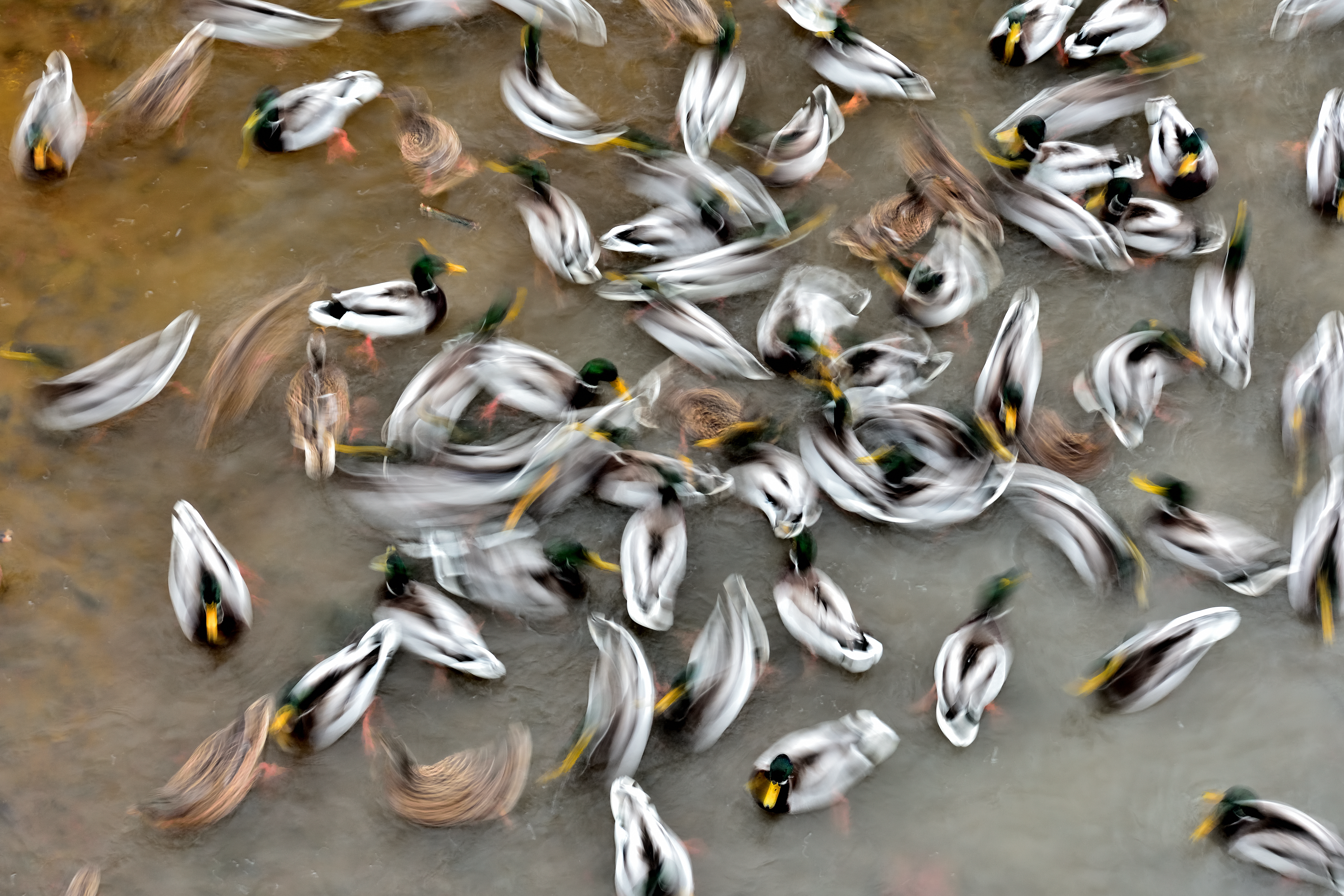
A concentrated mallard duck flock feeding in the waters surrounding Yelagin Island, highlighting the population density increases characteristic of urbanized habitats.

Including the correlation between other variables, such as aggression and wariness, multiple studies show a population density increase. Population density is the population number in one unit of area at a given time. The increase in population density has been highly correlated with the reduction in species wariness, as well as their intra-species aggression. As population density increases, wariness of humans decreases- this is known as a negative correlation. As population density increases, intra-specific aggression increases- this is known as a positive correlation. Park spaces in urbanized spaces may contribute to this population density increase. These parks allow for species to mate, and access and be fed food by humans, with little to no predation.

=== Decreased wariness and increased boldness ===
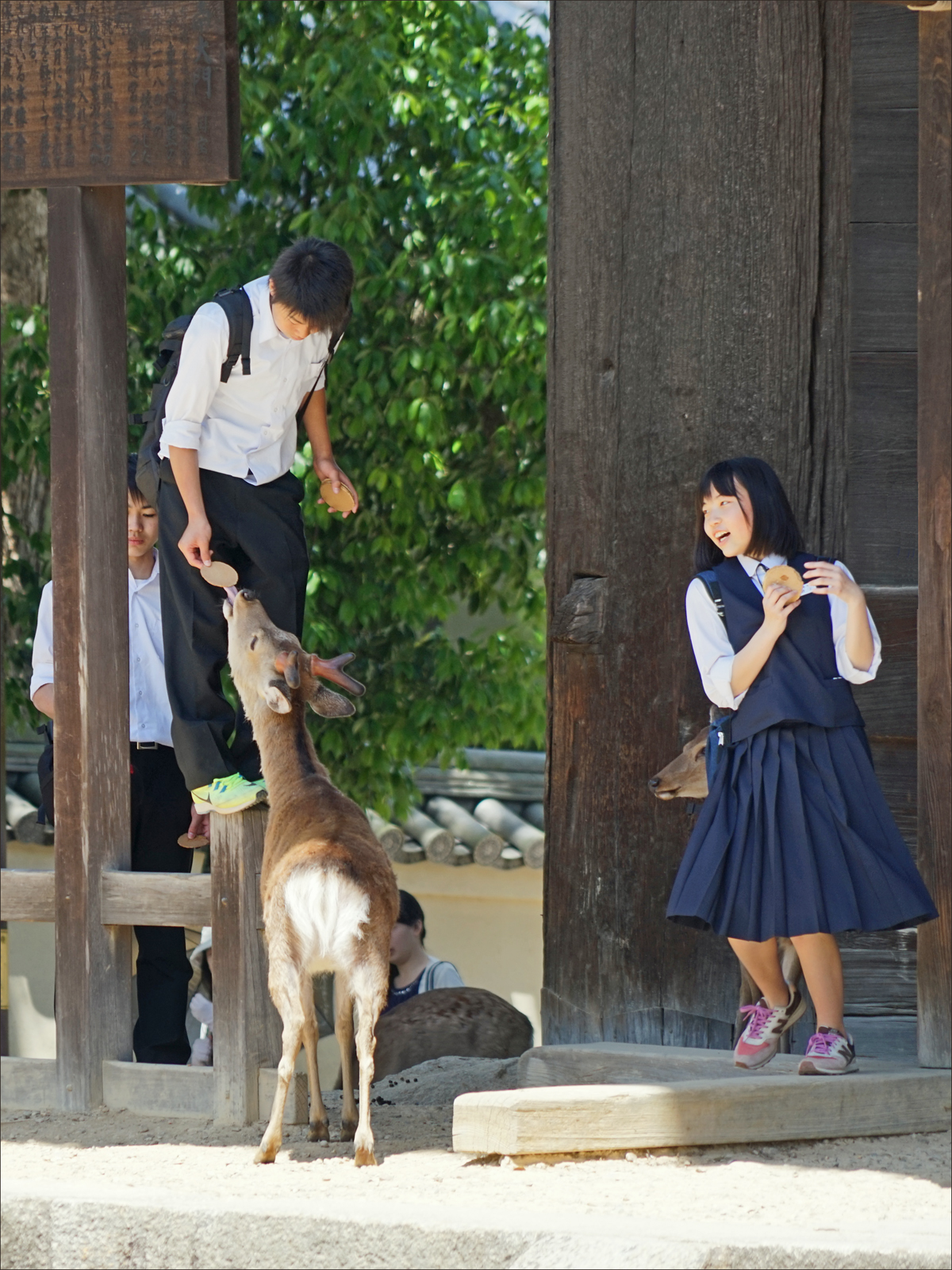
Urban-adapted sika deer approaching students at Nara Park, demonstrating reduced wariness and heightened boldness shaped by sustained exposure to human activity.

Wariness is the observable fear or caution that animals exhibit when encountering humans, typically shown through a startled response or rapid retreat. Previous research hypothesized that population density is the main influence on this behavioral change. Through coexistence, animals grow accustomed to human presence, not only becoming less startled, but also more willing to approach and physically interact with humans. For urban squirrel populations in parks in particular, this behavioral change was in response to human willingness to feed them. This is a demonstration of boldness, which is characterized by the propensity of the animal to take risks, explore novel environments, or approach potentially threatening situations. When presented with the option of feeding in a farmland or a forested area, bolder individuals across a range of wildlife species consistently demonstrated a preference for the farmland despite the risk of encountering humans, whereas shy individuals selected the safer, forested area for foraging. Across various species, increasing levels of synurbization have been positively correlated with an increase in boldness. Species that colonized urban environment earlier consistently show increased boldness when compared to more recently synurbanized species, reflecting cumulative long-term processes rather than short-term plasticity alone.

=== Increased intra-specific aggression ===
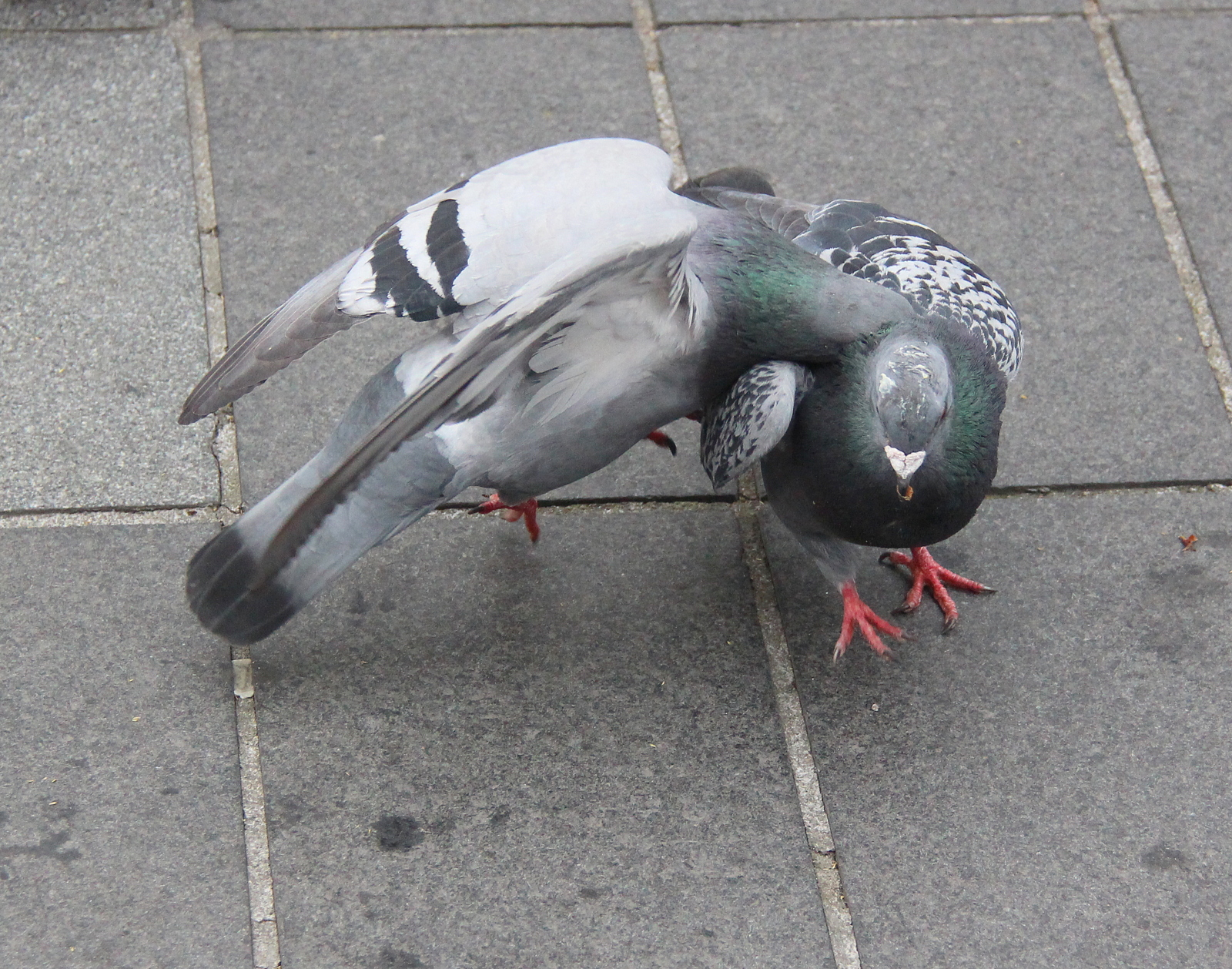
Conflict between urban pigeons, illustrating the heightened intra-specific aggression driven by crowding and competition for limited resources.

Intra-specific aggression refers to antagonistic interactions toward members of the same species. The increase in intra-specific aggression may be the result of the increase in population density, as having more members of a species in a smaller unit area, all whilst still competing for the same resources, like food, shelter, and nesting sites, has been linked to competition and higher aggression levels. While these patterns favor the survival and reproductive success of bold or competitive individuals, they also introduce the risk for injuries and stress, and they negatively affect the fitness and survival of subordinate individuals.

=== Reduced migration ===
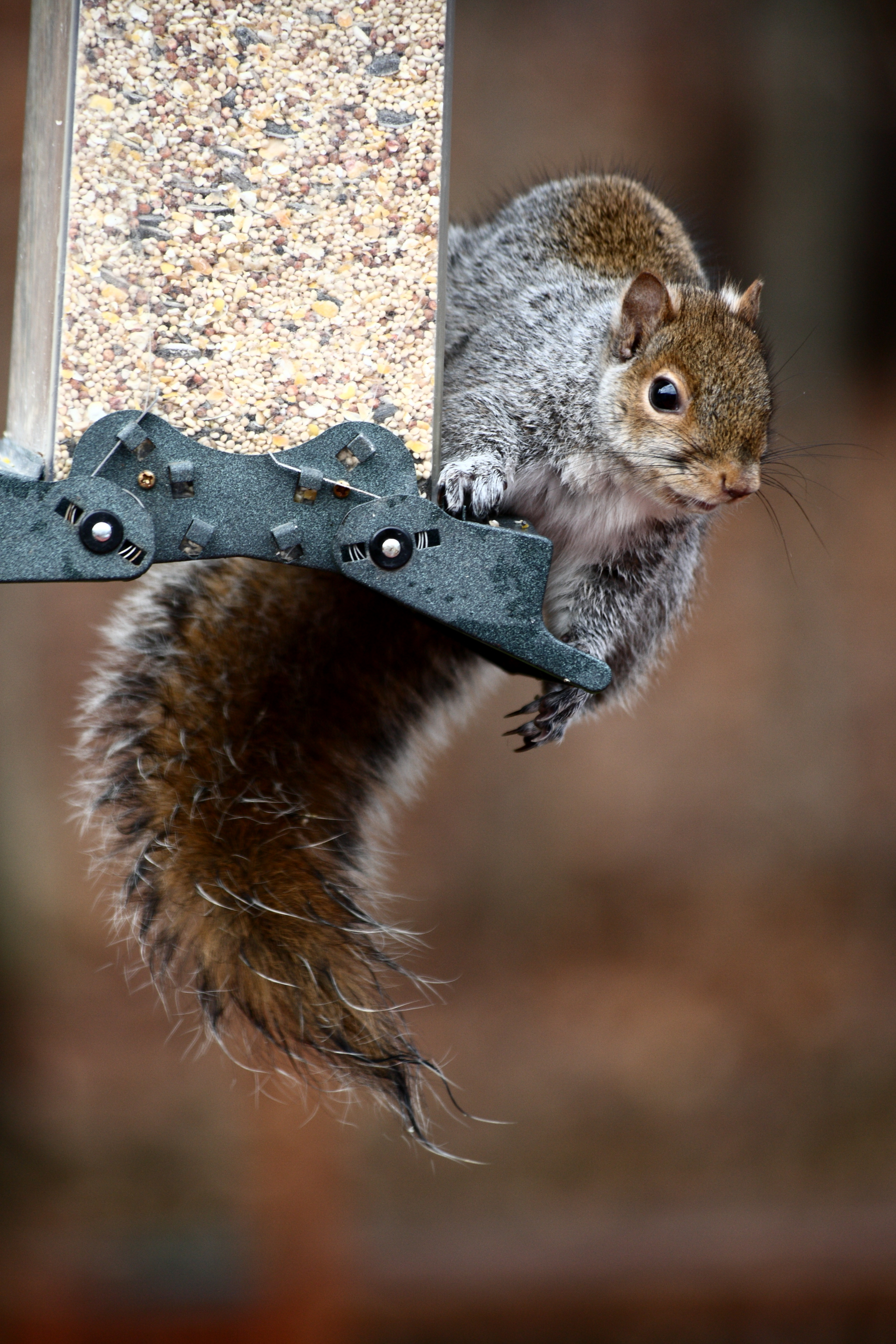
Squirrel having easy access to food due to wildlife feeders placed by humans.

Urban microclimates and predictable access to anthropogenic food sources have reduced the need for migratory species to leave during the colder seasons. As a result, many urban populations of migratory species become sedentary and remain city residents throughout the whole year, reducing energetic expenditure and decreasing exposure to hazards such as storms, predation, and navigational errors. In turn, this reduced migratory behavior, coupled with the preferential climate, access to man-made structures and shelters, and lower predation, extends the breeding season of urban inhabitants compared to rural populations.

=== Change in the circadian rhythm ===
Circadian rhythms, largely governed by light exposure, structure both the behavior and physiology of organisms to correspond with natural temporal cycles and external environmental cues. As the degree of urbanization increases in an area, so does the amount of light pollution from sources like street lamps, cars, homes, and large billboards, leading to an increase in the amount of artificial light exposure and an altered circadian rhythm that is out of sync with the daylight cycle.

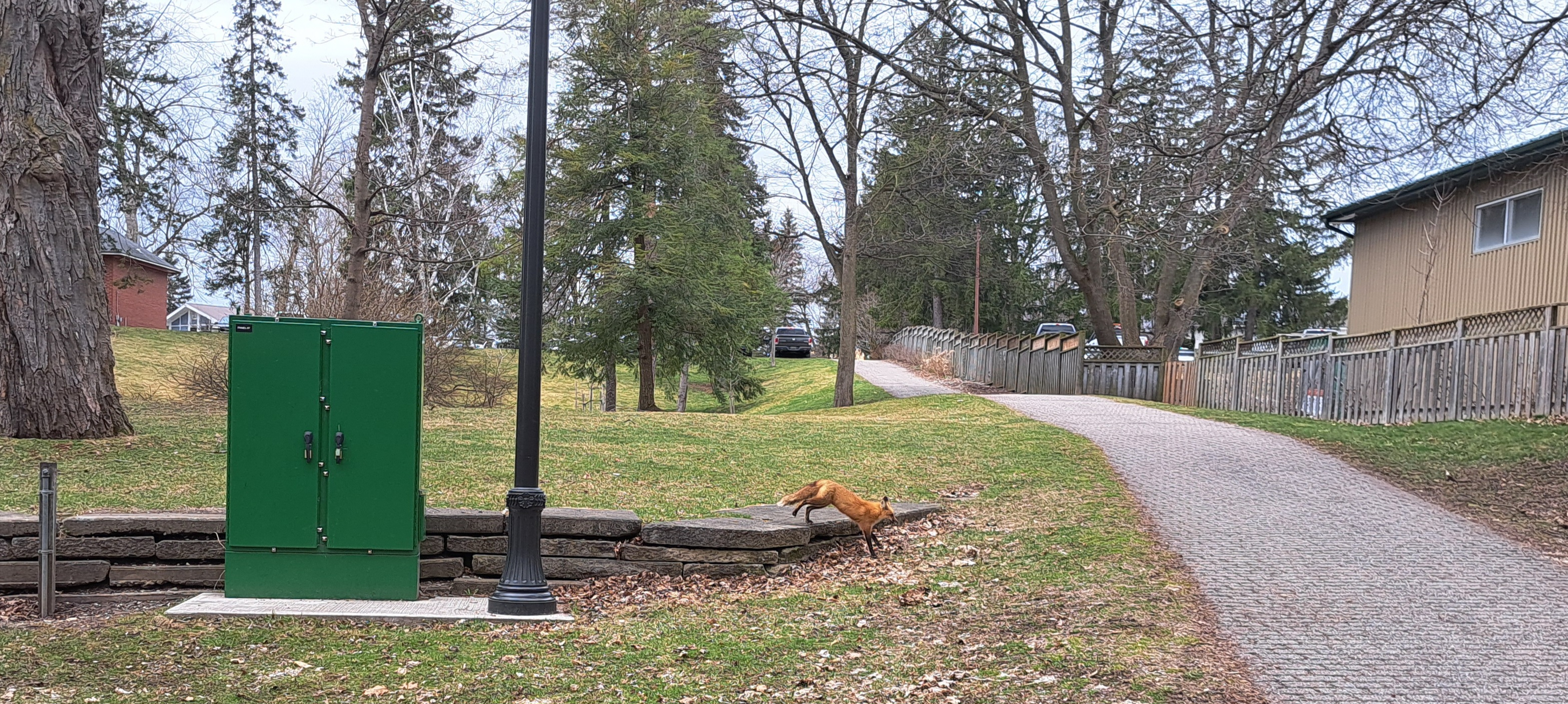
A red fox foraging in a city park during daylight hours, illustrating altered activity patterns in a typically nocturnal species.

In response to this increase in light exposure during nighttime hours, urban populations of small mammals have adapted their behavior to be active throughout the whole day, showing no preference for either nocturnal or diurnal activity. Synurbic bird populations, such as members of the European blackbird species, have been shown to have a shortened duration of their circadian period and have modified their behavior to begin daily activities earlier in the mornings. Beyond the influence of artificial light, the continuous anthropogenic noise and movement in urban environments eliminates the predictable onset of quiet and low activity associated with night in the remote wilderness, further contributing to circadian disruption. Multiple mammal species that typically exhibit foraging activity during the day in their natural habitats have become primarily nocturnal when adjusting to live in urban settings as a way to avoid human contact. Others demonstrate a reduction in total daily activity, resulting in greater time spent resting at the expense of foraging and other beneficial behaviors that increase survival and reproduction.

=== Changes in dwellings ===
Synurbic populations have been observed to alter their dwelling habits, incorporate materials commonly found in human-populated environments into their nesting material, and make use of man-made structures as shelters as they adapt to living in urban areas.

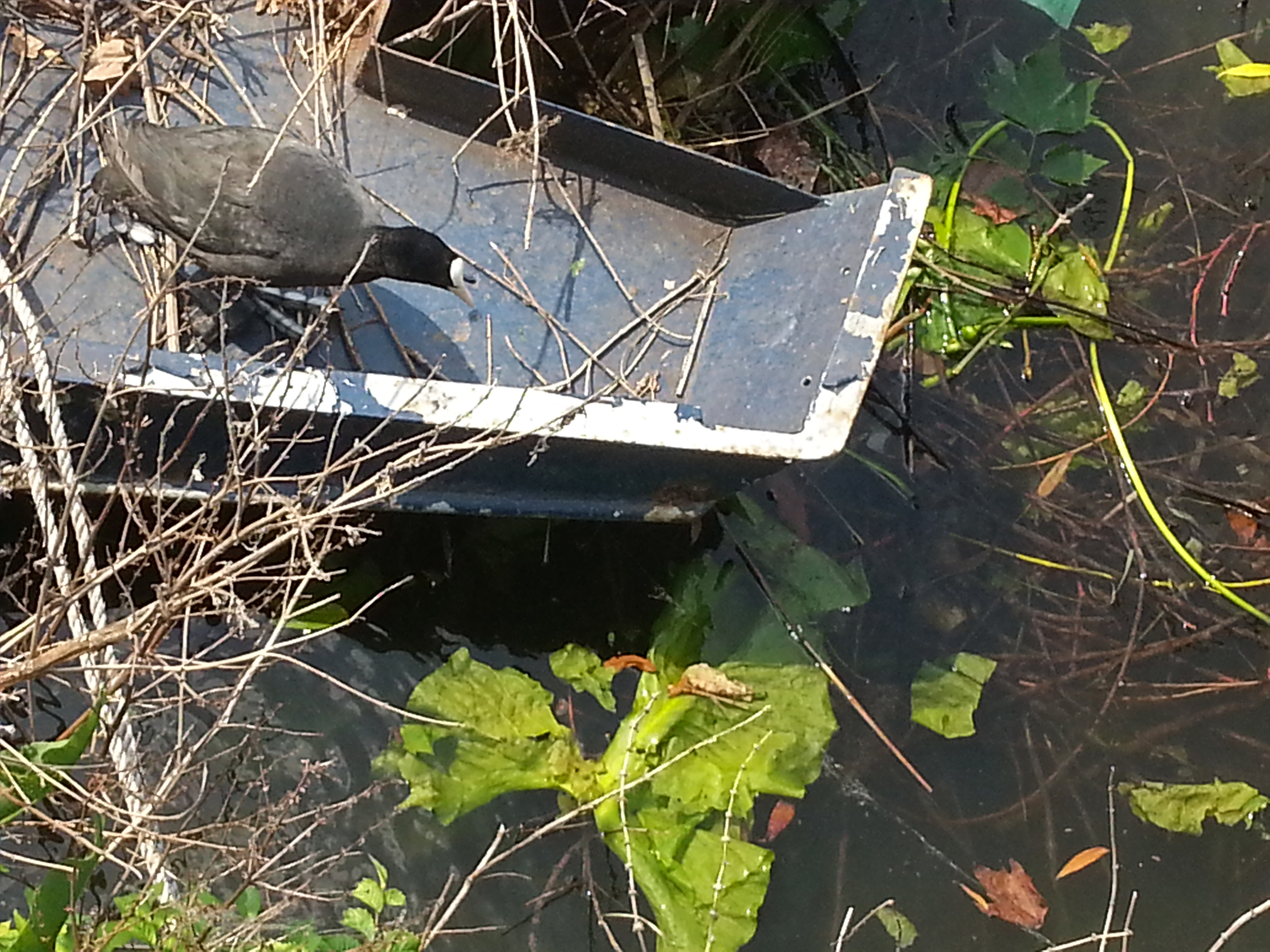
An urban coot using part of a sunken boat as a nest in an Amsterdam canal.

Urban birds frequently modify their nesting behavior to account for the limited natural materials and suitable nesting sites in their new environment. While birds in rural areas use the abundant twigs, grass, moss, and other naturally occurring materials for their nests, urbanized birds have less access to these types of materials and adapt by using plastic, paper, and string to build their nests. Many may also use the infrastructure of buildings, bridges, public parks, and utility poles for nesting and roosting. In some species, such as the magpie, an increase in nest heights of urban populations has been documented in response to human activity close to the ground. Other species, including Torresian crows and little ravens, adjust to urban living by forming large, communal roosts that improve individual fitness through collective predator defense and information sharing about food sources, behaviors that are absent from their rural counterparts.

A number of small urban mammal populations have likewise been found to use buildings and other artificial structures as den sites or shelters, especially during the winter, improving their survival. However, species that do not exhibit such behavioral flexibility have been unable to successfully colonize and persist in urban environments, which often have dense soil, spare vegetation, and fewer trees, increasing competition for the limited natural refuges remaining in urbanized areas and making the construction of burrows unfeasible.

=== Behavioural homogenization ===
Urban environments often favour a recurring suite of traits, sometimes referred to as an 'urban wildlife syndrome', including reduced fear of humans, greater use of anthropogenic food, shifts in daily activity, and increased use of human-made structures. Such repeated shifts may reduce behavioural diversity across individuals, populations, and species - a process termed 'behavioral homogenization' - potentially affecting ecosystem functioning, animal cultures, and human–wildlife interactions.

== Changes in Physiology ==
Urban animals undergo a range of physiological changes that track closely with the behavioral shifts required to survive in human-modified landscapes. The expansion into an urban environment and subsequent alterations to dietary choices and foraging behaviors, new movement patterns, and constant exposure to urban stressors all contribute to shaping the distinct physiology observed in urbanized species.

=== Changes in gut microbiome and immunity ===
Rapid urbanization has more recently been linked to incidences of autoimmune diseases, such as irritable bowel syndrome, in humans due to the reduced diversity of the gut microbiota through Westernization of diet, pollution, and increased antibiotic use associated with urbanized populations. Additionally, in urban birds, shifts in habitat use and diet have been shown to increase susceptibility to pathogens through alternation of microbial composition and diversity. Beyond microbial impacts, urbanization also modulates the immune defenses of wildlife by shifting the composition and distribution of pathogens relative to natural habitats. In feral pigeons, increasing urbanization was found to correlate with reduced natural antibody activity, suggesting possible immunosuppression or adaptive downregulation of innate defenses in heavily modified environments.

=== Changes in body mass ===
Due to the altered ecological conditions of urbanized environments, urban animals often differ in body mass when compared to those in living in their native habitats, though the direction of change depends on the interplay of a variety of factors specific to the population in question. For some species that have demonstrated an ability to adapt to the stressors, selective pressures, and anthropogenic food sources presented by an urban environment, an increase in body mass has been observed. In Silver Gulls in particular, this difference was exclusive to male members of the species and was correlated with an improvement in body condition. However, other urban species that have been studied, such as rufous-collared sparrows and Eurasian red squirrels, exhibit lower body mass. Potential explanations that have been proposed include the physiological toll of higher disease and parasite exposure, as well as the elevated stress associated with inhabiting non-native habitats for these populations.

=== Increased lifespan ===
Animals living in urbanized populations are, on average, living substantially longer than their rural population counterparts. This is due to the interplay of various factors such as reduced migratory behaviors, extended reproductive seasons, and predictable access to food and shelter.

== Consequences of Urban Development and Synurbization ==
=== Ecological Impacts ===
Urban development produces extensive ecological changes that influence the distribution, behavior, and long-term viability of wildlife populations. As more land continues to be occupied for city use, one of the most consistently observed outcomes has been a reduction in native species richness and ecological diversity. Although urbanized areas are also associated with an increase in invasive species abundance, they often outcompete native organisms, disrupt natural ecosystem interactions, and place a strain on available resources, which, combined with the reduction of natural habitat and niche availability, drives down overall urban biodiversity. Many of these invasive species are generalists, capable of exploiting a range of resources and easily adapting to urban conditions. This contributes to the ecological homogenization of cities worldwide, with the same familiar species, such as pigeons, sparrows, gulls, racoons, squirrels, mice, rats, and cockroaches, occupying similar niches across distant urban regions. However, some research has proposed that the growing tendency towards synurbization observed in birds and mammals is a chance for enriching diversity of urban wildlife if speciation occurs.

=== Challenges of High-Density Urban Wildlife Populations ===
From a human perspective, synurbization of some species could cause practical problems when their populations grow to high concentrations, an example of which has been reflected in the property damage and habitat degradation caused by the Canada goose in North American cities. Similar issues have been connected to the rise in urban corvid populations, though they have also been implicated in complaints about noise, waste accumulation, and impacts on other birds species. The behavioral shifts associated with synurbization, particularly decreased wariness and increased boldness, also pose a legitimate health hazard through zoonotic disease transmission. In the United States, deer are a major carrier of tick-borne diseases, and those that exhibit reduced wariness and increased boldness are more likely to live near the forest edge and interact with humans, contributing to the rapid rise in Lyme disease infections. Another consequence of increased boldness, especially with urban deer populations, is an increase in vehicle collisions with wildlife.

=== Risks For Bold Urban Wildlife ===
The increased presence of wildlife in urban spaces, whether from urban development encroaching into natural habitats or synurbization-driven behavioral adaptations in animals, also contributes to human–wildlife conflict. For urban-dwelling animals, this increases their risk for targeted attack or culling by humans who perceive them as a threat or are unaccustomed to their presence. Some who report to have an irrational fear of wildlife in their yards resort to "intentional abuse" and "unethical treatment" to minimize their presence, setting up traps, leaving out poison for them to consume, or shooting at them with guns and arrows to bleed out.

=== Human Influence on Animal Behavior ===
Due to excessive "hand-rearing" in bird species, some individuals may become behaviorally crippled, losing innate survival skills that members of their species would otherwise possess. One of the vital behavioral responses that the young of urbanized populations lose is their fear of humans, which reduces their overall fear responses to other environmental threats, increases their risk of being preyed upon by natural predators, and overall lowers their fitness.

=== High Population Density and Disease Transmission ===
Population density, far more representative of synurbic wildlife than non-synurbic wildlife, contributes to disease transmission. The more animals you have in an area, the more contact occurs and the more pathogens can spread within overcrowded conditions. Synanthropic species are known to reach higher levels of population density in urban locations than rural ones. In one study, it was found that urban wildlife (rats) had a greater abundance of zoonotic pathogens than in rural wildlife. Urbanized mammals have more parasites and zoonotic agents than their non-urban counterparts. In Nairobi, a highly anthropogenic city, rodents, livestock, and synurbic wildlife create overlapping epidemiological networks, lending themselves to an easier transmission of bacterial gene acquisition like antibiotic resistance. Faecal analyses of urban vertebrates revealed a significant detection of zoonotic-associated bacteria, and pathogen potential was related to the density overlap of urban wildlife. However, since synurbic wildlife represents those with adaptation to anthropogenic locations, it is clear that population density plays a large role in pathogen potential. Overpopulation is a sure sign of synurbic wildlife; population density and the overlap among urban areas lead to increased potential transmission. Urban greening increases the potential for pathogens as rodent prevalence increases, and with more rodents come more rodent-borne zoonotic potential.

=== Pollution-Driven Consequences ===
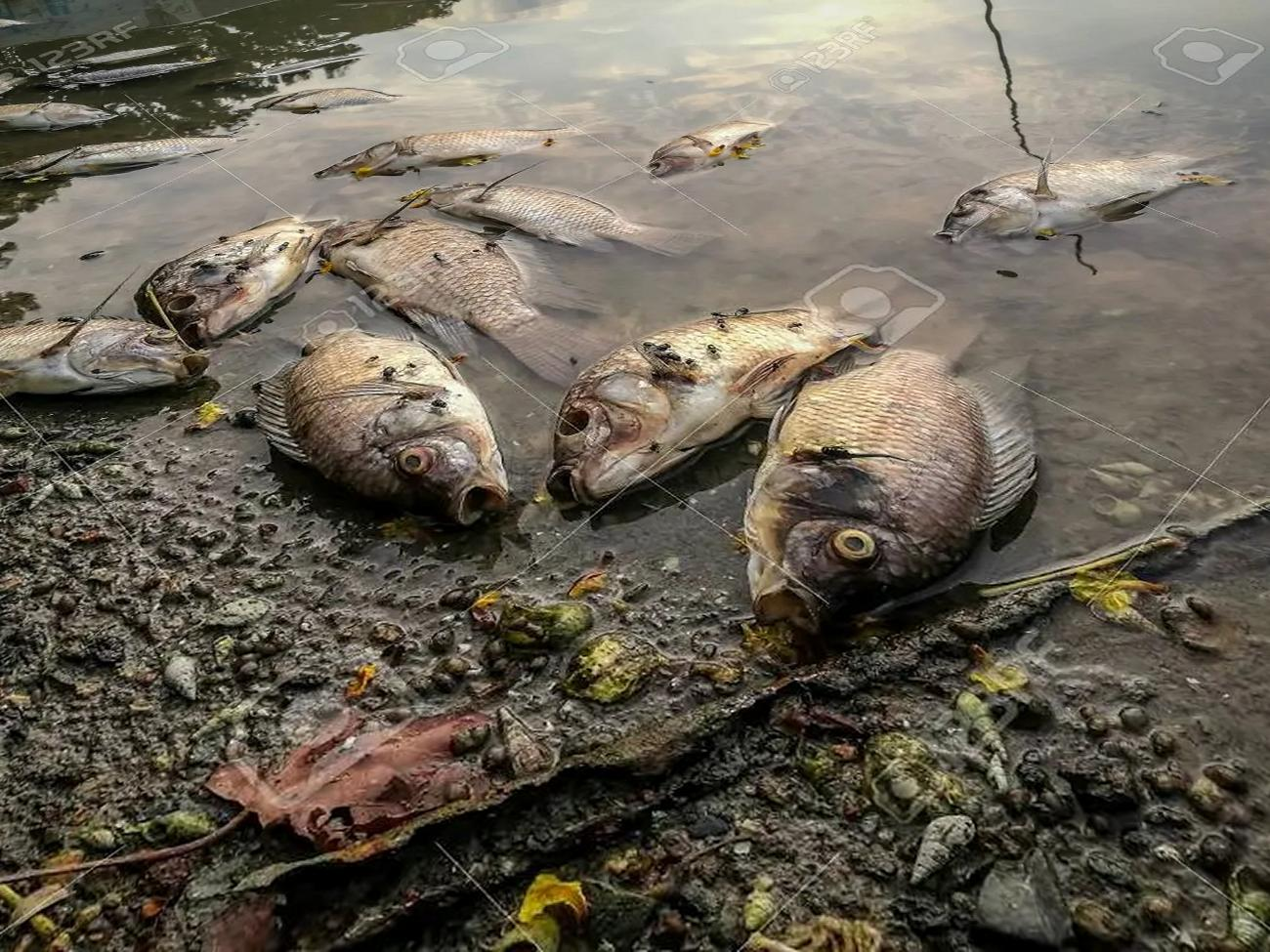
Water pollution can cause mass fish die-offs.

Wildlife in urban settings experience a variety of pollutants, from heavy metals to air particulates and organic/inorganic industrial chemicals, that simultaneously compromise immune capabilities and increase disease susceptibility. For example, heavy metal exposure is a recognized pollution impact that includes the increased accumulation of lead and cadmium in wildlife. This decreases immune response ability and increases disease susceptibility via cutaneous, respiratory, and gastrointestinal routes. Pollution particles from excessive air pollution, such as particulate matter and vehicular emissions, are known to impact urban wildlife immunology by reducing the antioxidant response ability and lowering immune performance. Urban industrial and chemical contaminants, from organic pollutants to industrial toxins/chemicals, reduce wildlife resilience through failures in detoxifiying mechanisms and energy diversion away from immune performance. This renders wildlife more susceptible to parasites and pathogens with impacts on reproductive functions, immune activities, and survivorship over other populations and environments. The greater the immune compromisation due to pollutants, the more wildlife can succumb to diseases, as well as convey zoonotic spillover for anthropogenic residents and companion animals. Furthermore, when coupled with other urban stressors - stress/overcrowding and dietary changes - which compound disease susceptibility stressors across wildlife populations, pollution factors further complicate urban wildlife pathology. Therefore, as more people live in urbanized settings across the world, environmental stressors compounded by pollution which increase disease susceptibility represent a critical component of synurbization that impacts wildlife viability and human pathways at the human-animal disease transmission link. Ultimately, factors of what pollutants do to wildlife in urbanized settings reinforce the importane of pollution stress as an impactful component to disease susceptibility in urban wildlife.

== Mechanisms and Drivers of Synurbization ==
=== Environmental Factors ===
Urban environments are an anthropogenic selective pressure for wildlife as the primary source for a myriad of conditions that encourage synurbization. For example, synurbization occurs due to many anthropogenic and environmental factors in human-modified environments; one such pressure includes anthropogenic noise. Anthropogenic noise is detrimental to wildlife in urbanized settings; however, where white crowned sparrows and Northern Mockingbirds shift the frequency of their songs to get above the masking created by urbanized sounds, an interesting difference exists between song-learning and response to anthropogenic noise, where song-learning species versus non-song learning species learn songs compiled differently based on their learning distinctions. In addition to anthropogenic noise, there exists anthropogenic chemical pollution, whose impact differs depending on factors like exposure and structural variation, alongside anthropogenic fragmentation. For example, urbanized reserves had more noise pollution, fragmentation, and vegetation loss than natural reserves, which on average supported higher species richness, indicating that fragmentation, source sound, and biogeographical variation have a significant impact on whether certain species can thrive (and therefore adapt) in urban environments or not. Therefore, urban vegetation in towns promotes different sound propagation, which encourages bird songs at optimal levels in relation to other noise. However, exposure from additional factors exists, with suburbanization also occurring on the biochemical level and microclimate variations. This indicates that potentially advantageous traits can serve some birds better than others when they have access to green spaces. Urban microclimates drastically vary from rural ones, stressing wildlife due to higher temperatures and water availability. The urban heat island effect denotes that cities have higher temperatures than rural areas. Rising temperatures create physical stress on adults and juveniles of wildlife, which affects activity time (day and night) and benefits those with increased thermal tolerance more. Therefore, where prolonged physiology might create a situation where organisms can no longer survive in the urban environment, adaptations may assist some species in staying. Regardless, the urban parameters create enough of a stressor to exert a great degree of selection on the wildlife.

=== Resource-Based Drivers ===
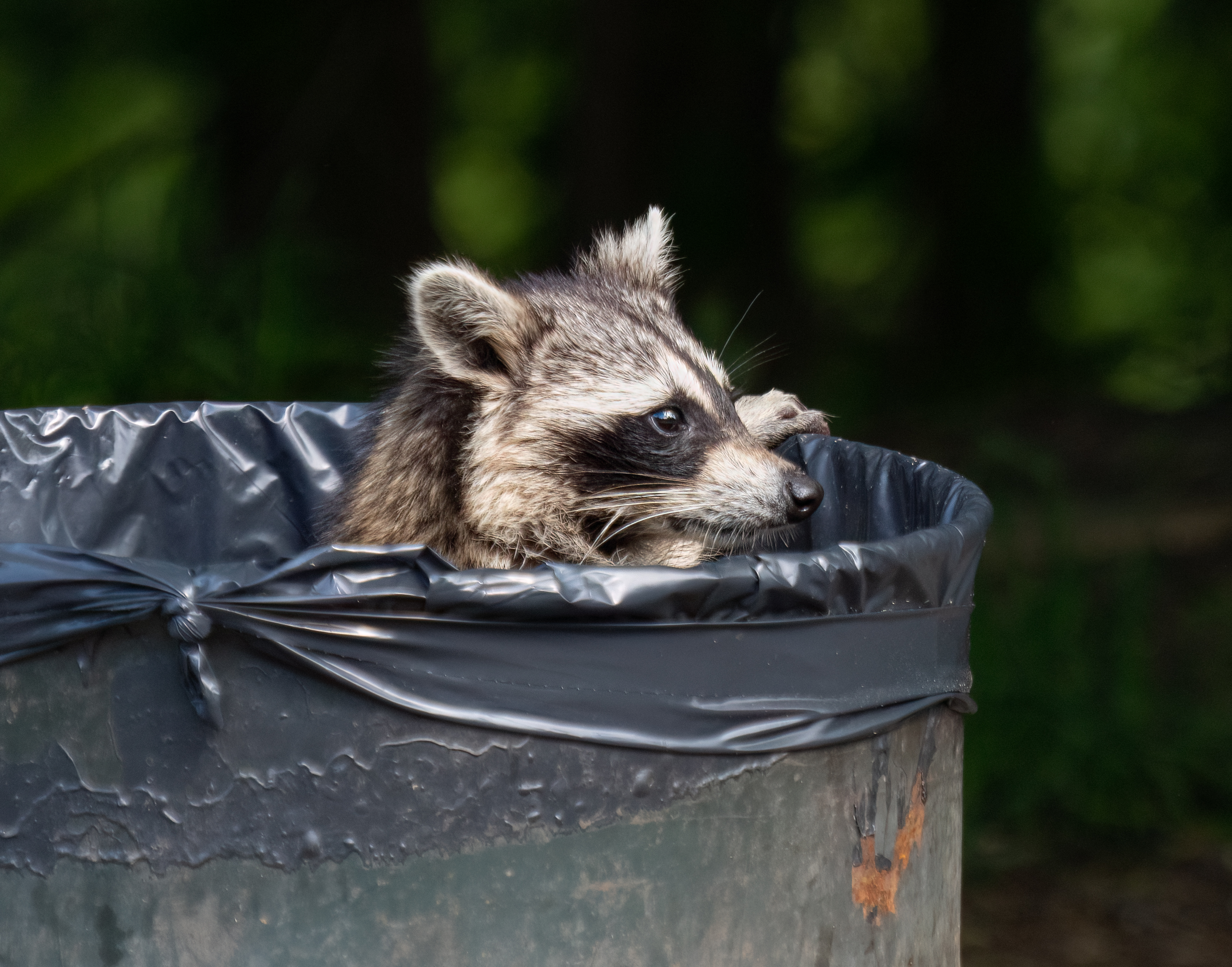
A raccoon is displaying opportunistic foraging by scrounging through the trash. Prospect Park (Brooklyn, NY).

Anthropogenic resource availability in urbanized areas cultivates a new source of food, water, and shelter, which further encourages synurbization. For instance, nearly 30-50% of Chicago urban coyotes' diet comes from anthropogenic means. Additionally, American White Ibises visit cities because of the increase in food sources. Food easily accessible promotes increases in birth rates and less energy expenditure required to search for food; therefore, increases in aggregation and spatial fidelity occur. However, urban foraging leads to unintended consequences with more wildlife-human interactions, diversion from wildlife's natural dietary intake, and many more negative consequences. For example, with more birds or fowl, there's greater disease transmission (pathogens spread more easily when condensing populations). Additionally, anthropogenic resources lead to nesting/sheltering opportunities for various animals. From nesting in trees to garbage and rooftops, yellow-legged gulls nest more often in urbanized environments than in traditionally suitable areas. However, even with such resources, food resource restriction is possible for those developing within niches relying on diminished prey that is not as common in urban settings, which was the case in one study conducted on the brown anole lizard. Furthering this notion, synurbization can create a phenomenon of population-based dietary specialization, where studies of urban coyotes and sympatric rodents find different means of feeding strategies and niche diversification based on humans' feeding opportunities.

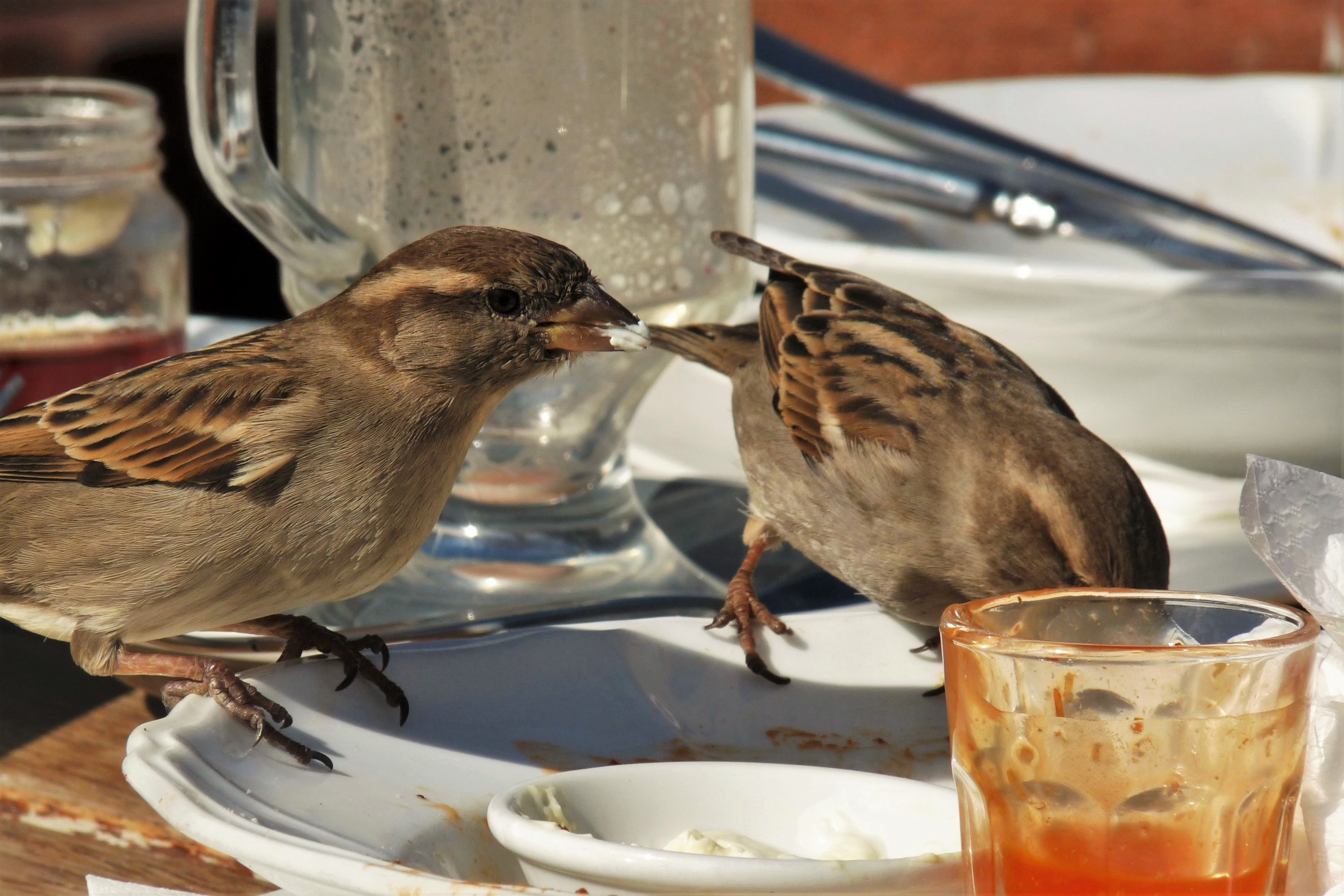
Two house sparrows (Passer domesticus) foraging for food left behind by humans outside a cafe in New Zealand.

=== Biological and Behavioral Drivers ===
Adaptation to urban wildlife anthropogenic landscapes is influenced by not only environmental disruption but biological and behavioral tendencies of the species. The more behaviorally plastic and bold an animal, the more capable a species is to adapt to the urban setting, and as a result, the more likely it is to survive. For example, in comparison to rural populations, species like blackbirds show less wariness towards humans and problem-solving capabilities; urban great tits and their enhanced problem-solving capabilities and resourcefulness exemplify this. Animals adapt their circadian rhythms to compensate for human activities; urban raccoons are significantly more nocturnal than their rural counterparts, while coyotes shift their most active time from daytime to late dusk-early dawn. In addition, those species that employ social learning are potentially more/less adaptable based on how much social learning can be implemented; the more conspecifics that can learn how to problem solve independently and reduce inter-specific competition. As a result, urbanized wildlife possess specific cognitive gestures and flexibility that accompany these into problem-solving and memory/learning tasks when embedded in an urbanized setting; raccoons are widely regarded as some of the most resourceful creatures for food obtained in human settings, and urban foxes are widely known as good problem solvers with great integrative memory. In the end, boldness, plasticity, social learning, and cognitive characteristics all come together to create a behavioral framework through which certain individuals - and species - can adapt successfully through a variety of determination skills and reproductive opportunities. Therefore, a duality of biological and behavioral components emerges as a selective advantage for urbanized populations to create divergences in adaptation potential within similarly situated populations while simultaneously establishing which populations have the necessary resiliency components suitable for an urbanized environment.
