= Urban wildlife =

Wildlife that can live or thrive in urban environments

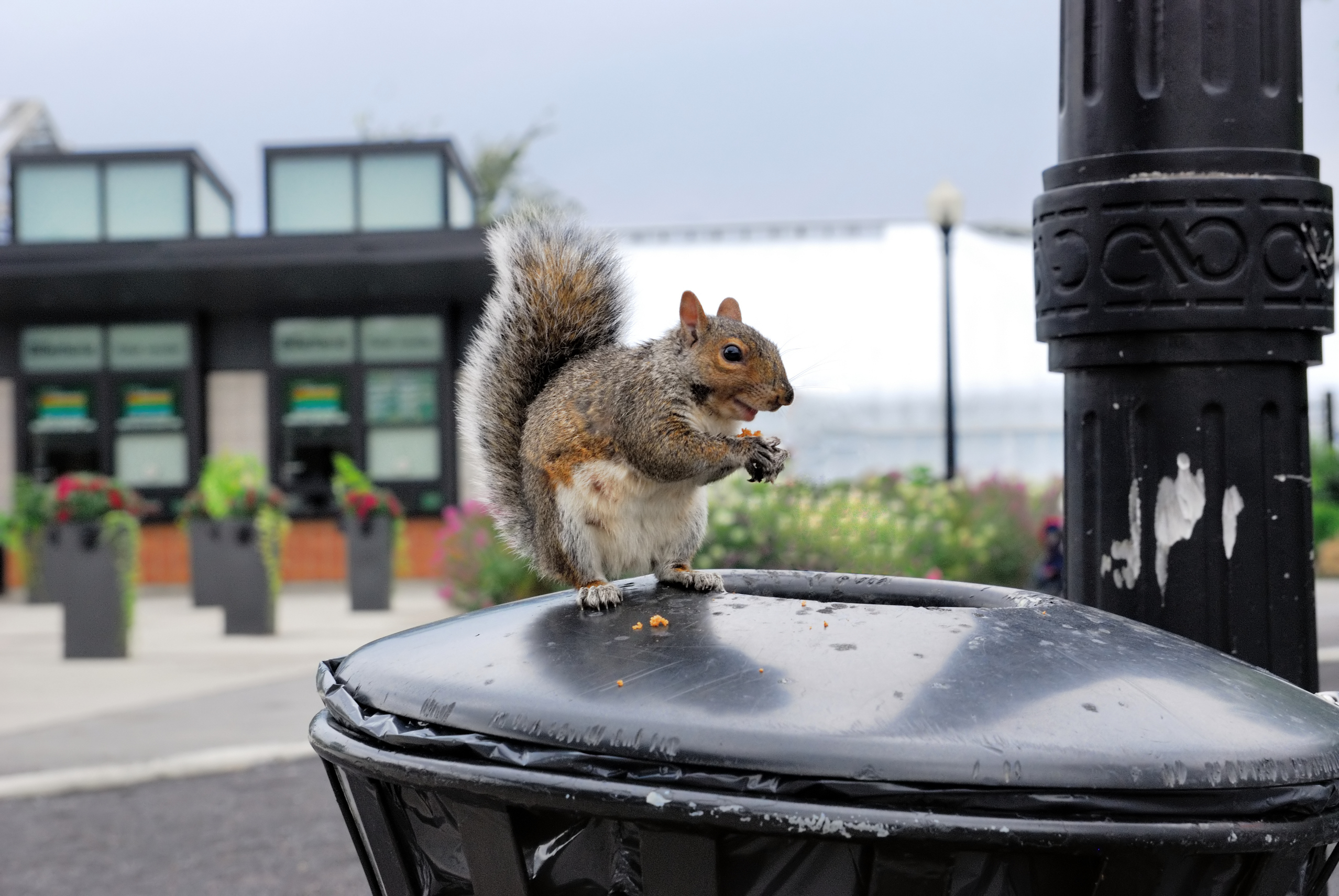
An eastern gray squirrel scavenging for food in a garbage can in Montreal

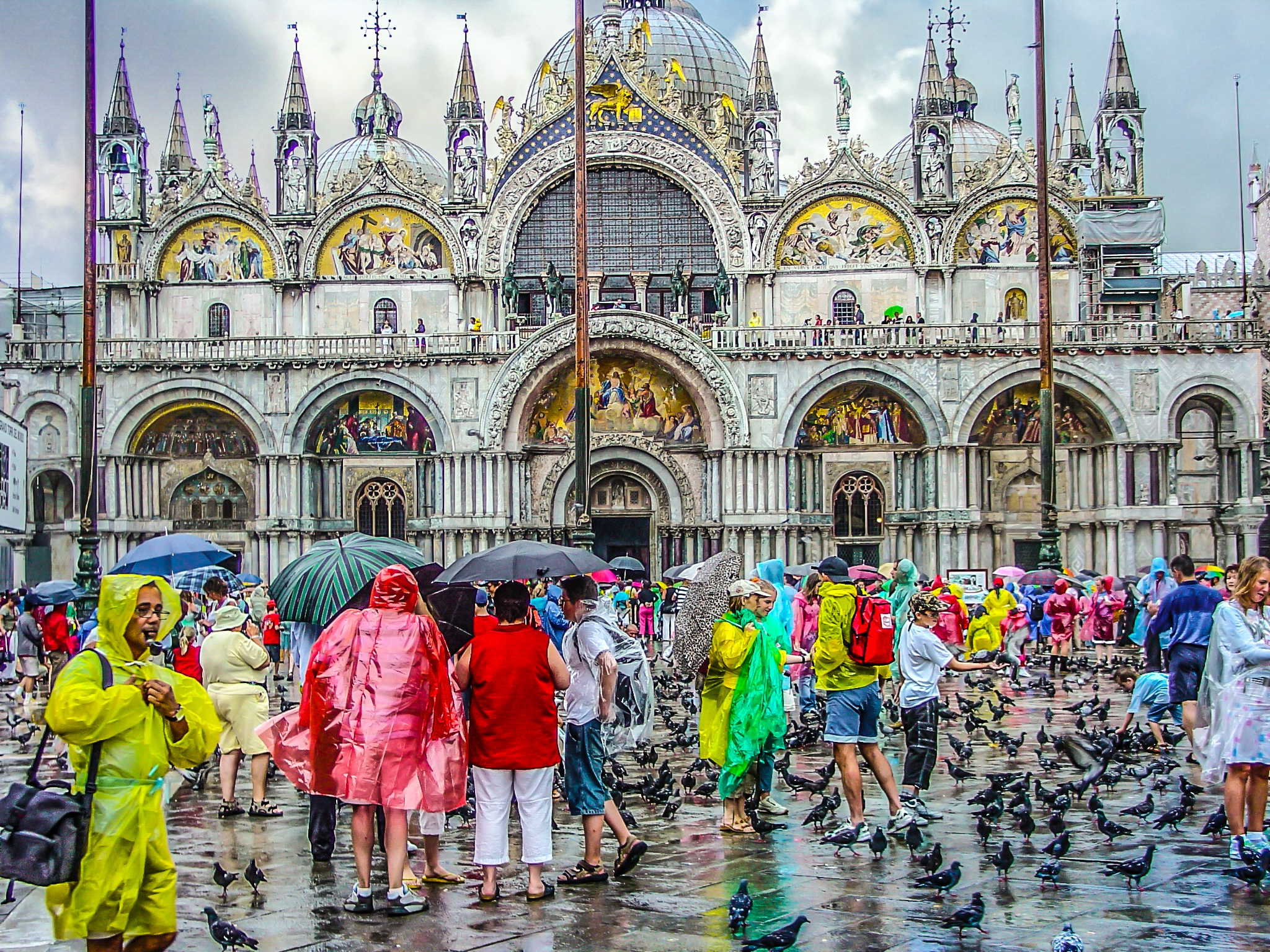
Pigeons intermingle with tourists in Venice

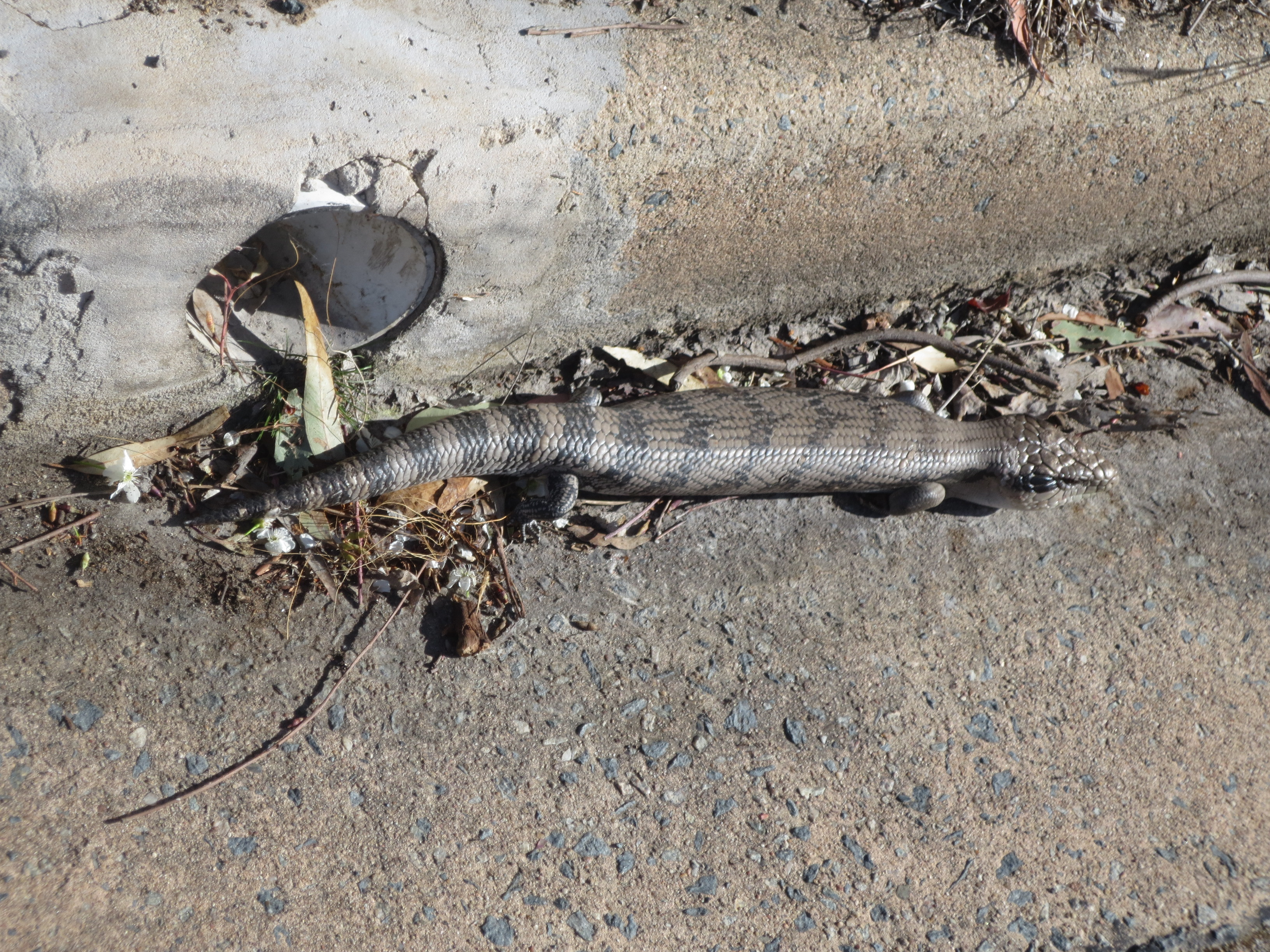
A blue-tongued skink in suburban street in Canberra (10.2 cm storm water pipe in photo shows size)

Urban wildlife refers to animal species that inhabit or frequently linger around urban and suburban areas, which are human settlements dominated by buildings, structures and human activities, such as cities, towns, and residential neighborhoods. These environments differ from natural habitats in terms of habitat fragmentation, human presence, food available and resource distribution, yet many species have adapted to survive and even flourish in urban settings. Urban wildlife contributes to local biodiversity, ecosystem function, and public health considerations.

Urban wildlife typically use the remaining urban forests, parklands, green spaces, garden/street vegetations and riparian shrubs along urban streams as niche habitats, while some others take refuge in gutters inside buildings, sewers and storm drains. They gradually become accustomed to being around humans, displaying significantly reduced territoriality and escape distances, and in some cases even have evolved quasi-symbiotic dependence on human environments for survival (i.e. synanthropic). These species represent a minority of the natural creatures that would normally inhabit an area, and contain a large proportions of feral and introduced species as opposed to truly native species. For example, a 2014 compilation of studies (which were biased towards work in Europe, with very few studies from south and southeast Asia) found that only 8% of native bird and 25% of native plant species were present in urban areas compared with estimates of non-urban density of species.

Urban wildlife can be found at any latitude that supports human dwellings. Different types of urban areas support different kinds of wildlife. One general feature of bird species that adapt well to urban environments is they tend to be the species with bigger brains, perhaps allowing them to be more behaviorally adaptable to the more volatile urban environment. In addition to birds, arthropods (e.g. insects, spiders, millipedes and woodlice), gastropods (land snails and slugs), various worms (e.g. earthworms), some reptiles (e.g. house geckos) and mammals (especially rats and mice) can also thrive well in the niches of human settlements. There are also animals that live outside urban area but will venture into urbanized human settlements to forage on horticultures or to scavenge from trash and food wastes, the list of which runs from monkeys in the tropics to polar bears in the Arctic.

== Adaptation to urban environments ==
Many species adjust to urban environments through a process called synurbization, which describes the behavioral and ecological changes that allow animals to cope with human-dominated landscapes. These adaptations may include changes in feeding behavior, daily activity, movement patterns, and tolerance of human presence. Examples of species that have adapted to urban life include blackbirds (Turdus merula), striped field mice (Apodemus agrarius), and urban foxes.

== Ecological characteristics ==
Urban ecosystems tend to favor generalist species, which can survive on a wide range of foods and in varied habitats. Species that require specific habitats, such as forest specialists, often decline as urbanization increases. Typical urban wildlife includes small mammals such as rats, mice, and squirrels; birds such as pigeons and sparrows; medium-sized mammals like raccoons, foxes, and coyotes; reptiles; and various invertebrates. Many of these species utilize human-provided food sources, such as trash bins, gardens, and sewer systems, and may adjust their behavior, for example becoming more active at night to avoid humans.

Cities create opportunities for new ecological interactions among species. However, urban wildlife communities are often dominated by resilient generalists and invasive species, which can reduce the diversity of native animals and contribute to ecological uniformity across cities.

== Evolution ==
Urban environments can exert novel selective pressures on organisms, sometimes leading to new adaptations. For example, the weed Crepis sancta, found in France, has two types of seed, heavy and fluffy. The heavy ones land near the parent plant, whereas the fluffy seeds float further away on the wind. In urban environments, seeds that float far often land on infertile concrete surfaces. Within about 5-12 generations the weed has been found to evolve to produce significantly more heavy seeds than its rural relatives. Among vertebrates, a case is urban great tits, which have been found to sing at a higher pitch than their rural relatives so that their songs stand out above the city noise, although this is probably a learned rather than evolved response. Urban silvereyes (an Australian bird) make contact calls that are higher frequency and slower than those of rural silvereyes. As it appears that contact calls are instinctual and not learnt, this has been suggested as evidence that urban silvereyes have undergone recent evolutionary adaptation so as to better communicate in noisy urban environments.

As a consequence of synurbization, animals that inhabit urban environments have differences in morphology, physiology and behavior when compared to animals that inhabit less urbanized areas. Hormone-mediated maternal effects are capable mechanisms of offspring phenotypic developmental modification. For instance, when female birds deposit androgens into their eggs, this affects many diverse aspects of offspring development and phenotype. Environmental factors that can influence the concentration of androgens in avian eggs include nest predation risk, breeding density, food abundance and parasite prevalence, all factors of which differ between urban and natural habitats. In a study that compared antibody and maternal hormone concentrations in eggs between an urban population and a forest population of European blackbirds, there were found to be clear differences in yolk androgen concentrations between the two populations. Although these differences cannot be attributed definitively (more studies have to be performed), they might result from different environments causing females to plastically adjust yolk androgens. Different yolk androgen levels are likely to program offspring phenotype.

Plant genetic variation has an influence on herbivore population dynamics and other dependent communities. Conversely, different arthropod genotypes have varying abilities to live on different host plant species. Differential reproduction of herbivores could lead to adaptation to particular host plant genotypes. For instance, in two experiments that examined local adaptation and evolution of a free-feeding aphid (Chaitophorus populicola) in response to genetic variants of its host plant (Populus angustifolia), it was found that, 21 days (about two aphid generations) after aphid colony transplantation onto trees from foreign sites, aphid genotype composition had changed. In the experiments, tree cuttings and aphid colonies were collected from three different sites and used to conduct a reciprocal transplant experiment. Aphids that were transplanted onto trees from the same site produced 1.7-3.4 times as many offspring as aphids that were transplanted onto trees from different sites. These two results indicate that activities of human perturbation that cause plant evolution may also result in evolutionary responses in interacting species that could escalate to affect entire communities.

Wildlife species that inhabit urban areas often experience shifts in food and resource availability. Some species, at times, must resort to human handouts or even human refuse as a source of food. One animal notorious for relying on such means for nutritional intake is the American white ibis. In a study that tested physiological challenge, the innate and adaptive immunity of two groups of white ibis (both consisting of 10 white ibis nurtured in captivity), one group being fed a simulated anthropogenic diet and the other being fed a natural ibis diet, it was determined that wildlife consumption of a diet with anthropogenic components (such as white bread) may be detrimental to a species' ability to battle bacterial pathogens.

== Public health and zoonotic disease ==
Some urban wildlife species can carry diseases that can infect humans, known as zoonotic diseases. Close contact between humans and animals such as rodents, raccoons, and stray domestic animals can increase the likelihood of disease transmission. Urban rodents have been shown to carry bacterial, viral, and parasitic pathogens, while certain urban birds, including ducks and crows, may carry antibiotic-resistant bacteria.

Understanding how diseases spread among urban wildlife, humans, and other animals is complex. The One Health approach emphasizes the interconnectedness of human, animal, and environmental health to help manage and prevent zoonotic risks.

== Conservation and management ==
While some urban wildlife species thrive in cities, others are negatively affected by habitat loss, pollution, and lack of connectivity to natural areas. Conservation strategies in urban areas aim to support biodiversity through practices such as habitat restoration, creating green corridors, planting native species, and involving communities in monitoring wildlife. These efforts can help reduce conflicts between humans and animals and promote healthier urban ecosystems.

Research on urban wildlife informs city planning and management practices that balance ecological, public health, and social objectives. Providing safe movement paths for wildlife, improving habitat quality, and limiting anthropogenic threats are important for sustaining urban biodiversity.

== Effects of artificial lights at night ==
Urban environments are defined by elevated levels of artificial light at night (ALAN), which constitute a significant ecological factor affecting wildlife behavior and physiology. Empirical research demonstrates that exposure to artificial light disrupts circadian and seasonal rhythms, alters foraging behaviors, and interferes with migration across diverse taxa. In urban contexts, such disruptions influence predator-prey dynamics, reproductive cycles, and patterns of habitat utilization. Furthermore, artificial light can shift species distributions by favoring light-tolerant organisms and displacing others, thereby shaping biodiversity and ecosystem processes within urban areas.

== Human–wildlife conflict ==
While urban areas tend to decrease the overall biodiversity of species within the city, most cities retain the flora and fauna characteristic of their geographic area. As rates of urbanization and city sprawl increase worldwide, many urban areas sprawl further into wildlife habitat, causing increased human-wildlife encounters and the potential for negative and conflict-based encounters. Humans have lived alongside and near wild animals for centuries, but the expansion of the study of urban ecology has allowed for new information surrounding human-wildlife interactions. Human wildlife conflict can be categorized into disease transmission, physical attacks, and property damage, and can be inflicted by a range of wildlife, from predatory tigers to grain-eating rodents.

=== Benefits of human–wildlife interactions ===
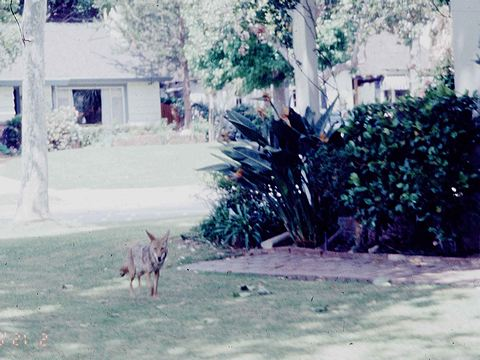
Urban coyotes are often at the forefront of human-wildlife conflicts in areas of Los Angeles County due to their ability to adapt to urban environments.

While negative human-wildlife conflicts can be damaging to the physical health of humans or property, human-wildlife interactions can be extremely beneficial in terms of ecosystem health and cultural experiences. The presence of native species allows systems and food chains to function in a healthy way, providing ecosystem services to the humans living around these areas. These services include the provisioning of food and water, flood control, cultural services, and nutrient cycling. Due to those perceived benefits, urban rewilding is now an active movement.

=== Costs of conflict ===
The most direct impacts of human-wildlife conflict include loss of livelihood due to property damage, loss of possessions due to property damage, injury, or transmission of disease from wildlife to humans. After the direct impacts of conflict, however, the people facing human-wildlife conflict are left with long-term issues including opportunity costs and long-term fear of wildlife.

Conflicts between human and wildlife are most likely to occur in areas intermediate between rural and entirely urban landscapes, and these interactions are most likely to involve species with broad diets able to live in areas with high populations. Some areas are subject to more extreme conflicts between humans and wildlife, such as in Mozambique and Namibia, where more than 100 people are killed each year by crocodiles. In Asia and Africa, many communities are also subject to 10-15% loss of agricultural output to elephants. Disease transmission is also significant in cases of human-wildlife conflict, where sprawling cities can expand into environments that increase exposure to hosts of vector-borne diseases, causing large outbreaks in cities with greater density of people. Modern examples of disease outbreaks from wildlife include the H5N1 virus (originating from and spread via birds) and SARS-CoV-2 (likely originated as a bat virome before jumping species), with the latter causing the COVID-19 pandemic that wrought significant global economic, political, and sociological turmoil within one year from its outbreak.

=== Conflict management ===
At the center of human-wildlife conflicts in urban areas are social attitudes towards wildlife encounters. A certain community's perception of risk of wildlife encounter greatly impacts their attitude towards wildlife, particularly in situations where livelihoods or safety are at risk. Many cutting-edge wildlife conflict management proposals include education programs to inform the public of both the risks and benefits of interacting with urban wildlife, and how to prevent hysteria and future negative encounters. Furthermore, conflict management includes addressing the hidden impacts of wildlife conflict, such as the disruption psychosocial wellbeing, disruption of livelihood and food sources, and food insecurity.

== Broadly distributed ==
Some urban species have a cosmopolitan (i.e. nonselective) distribution, in some cases almost global. They include cockroaches, silverfish, house mice, black/brown rats, house sparrows, rock doves and feral populations of domestic species.

== Africa ==
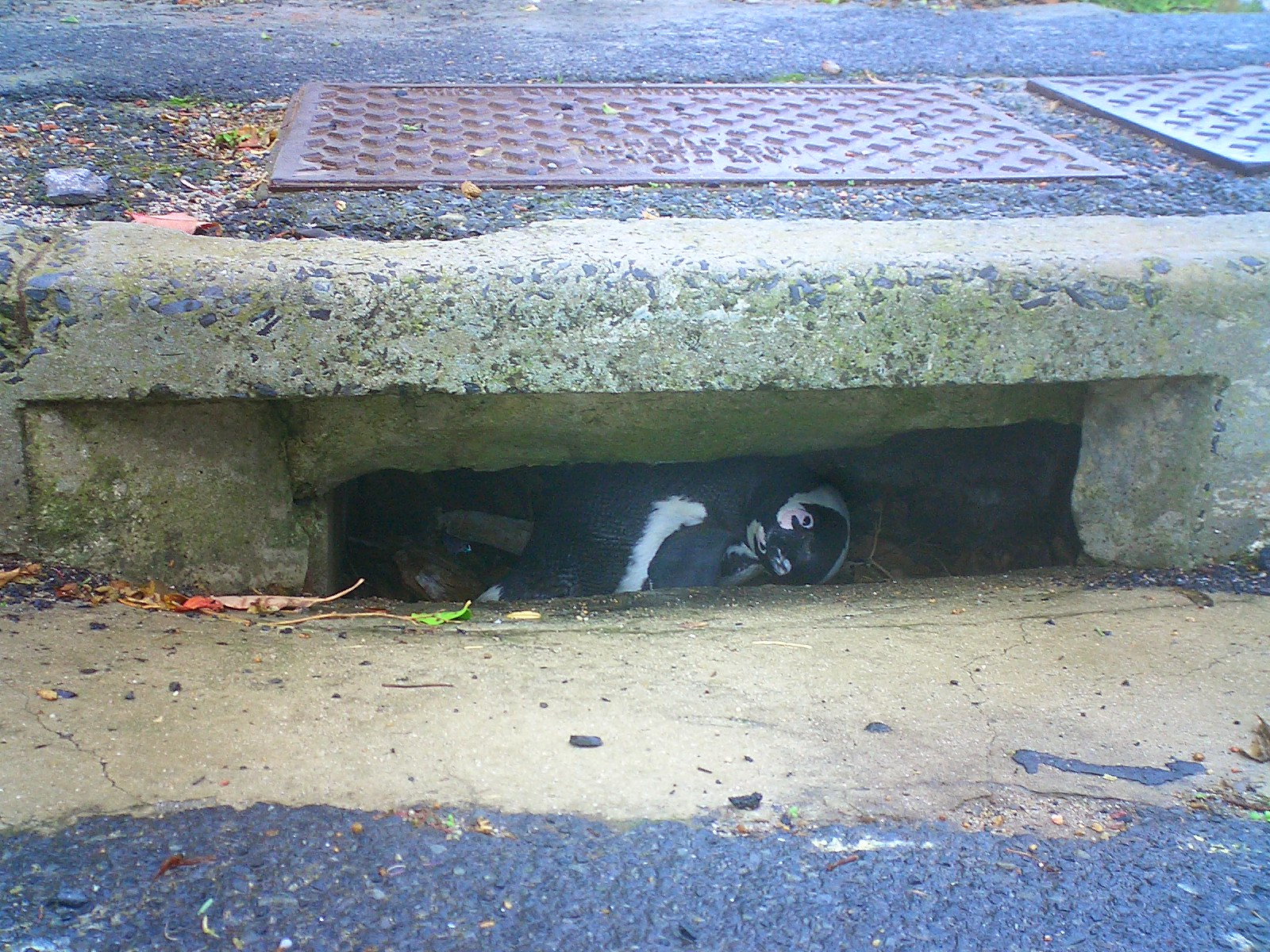
African penguins nesting in a roadside suburban storm drain in Cape Town, South Africa

As Africa becomes increasingly urbanized, native animals are exposed to this new environment with the potential of uniquely African urban ecologies developing. In the Cape Town urban area in South Africa, there is increasing conflict between human development and nearby populations of chacma baboons due to their growing dependence on tourists and the urban environment as sources of food. Elsewhere in Africa, vervet monkeys and baboons adapt to urbanization and similarly enter houses and gardens for food. African penguins are also known to invade urban areas, searching for food and a safe place to breed, even nesting inside storm drains; Simon's Town, which is near the popular Boulders Beach, actually had to take action to restrict penguin movement due to the noise and damage they caused. There are reports of leopards roaming suburban areas in cities such as Nairobi, Kenya and Windhoek, Namibia. Reptiles like the house gecko (Hemidactylus) can be found in houses. Artificial wetness brought about by swimming pools and watered lawns alongside supplementary feeding has made urban areas conducive for waterbirds such as African woolly-necked storks and hadada ibises in South Africa.

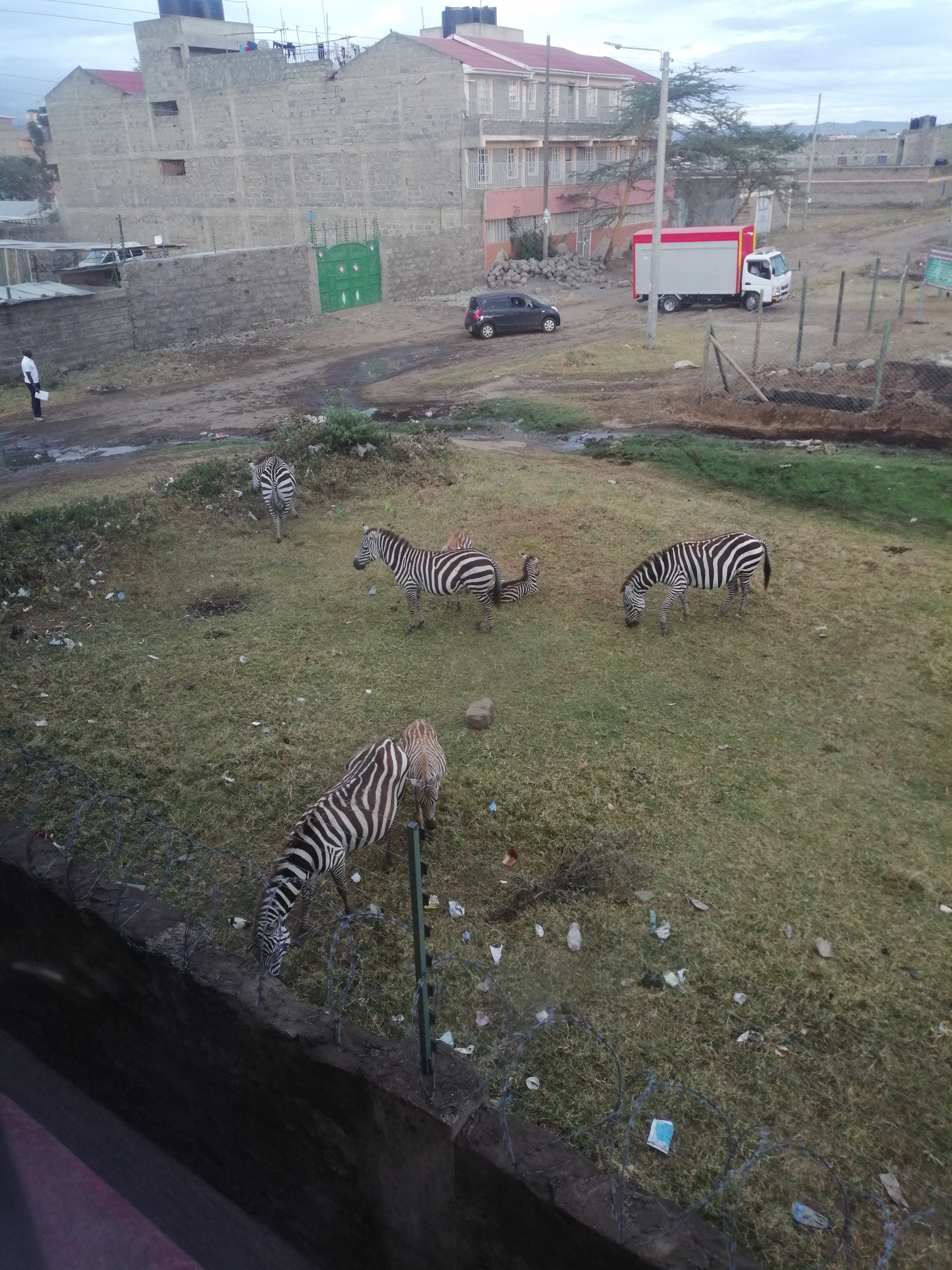
Wild zebras grazing in Naivasha, Kenya

== Australia and New Guinea ==
Urban areas in Australia are a particularly fruitful habitat type for many wildlife species. Australian cities are hotspots for threatened species diversity and have been shown to support more threatened animal and plant species on a per unit-area basis than all other non-urban habitat types. An analysis of urban sensitive bird species (birds that are easily disturbed and displaced) found that revegetation was effective at encouraging birds back into urban greenspaces, but also found that weed control was not. Invasive plant species such as Lantana (L. camara) actually provides refuge for some bird species, such as the superb fairywren (Malurus cyaneus) and silvereye (Zosterops lateralis), in the absence of native plant equivalents.

Some species of native animals in Australia, such as various bird species including the Australian magpie, crested pigeon, rainbow lorikeet, willie wagtail, laughing kookaburra and tawny frogmouth, are able to survive as urban wildlife, although introduced birds such as the Old World sparrow are more common in the centre of larger cities. In Queensland and parts of New Guinea, the local cassowary population has also shown behavioural changes to better adapt in the urban environment as their original rainforest habitats decline in size. These birds were far more alert and rested less than the more 'wild' counterparts and had quickly adapted to foraging on human waste as it offers a greater reward in food bounties. The Australian white ibis has reached pest status in parts of Australia, necessitating the killing of eggs in an effort to control the species. The urbanisation of these birds have made the cassowaries the largest urbanised birds in the world.

There are urban platypi in Hobart Rivulet in Hobart, Tasmania. Some of the most resilient small marsupial species, including the common ringtail/brushtail possum, sugar glider and northern brown bandicoot, and some megabats such as the grey-headed flying fox have also adapted somewhat to the urban/suburban environment. Nevertheless, there are many threats to urban areas in Australia such as habitat loss and fragmentation, invasive species (such as cats and Indian mynas), pest species (such as noisy miners), invasive weeds and other disturbances that accompany intensive human land use. If biodiversity is to flourish in urban areas, efforts at the community scale through initiatives such as Land for Wildlife and private land conservation, as well as policy and management efforts through restricting land clearing and providing incentives to retain nature in cities, are needed.

== Japan ==
Although culled aggressively in most of Japan for being a pest, the Sika deer is, for religious reasons, protected in the city of Nara and has become part of the urban environment. Due to the denseness of Japanese cities, birdlife is not as common as other parts of the world, though typical urban birds such as crows, sparrows, and gulls have adapted well. The declining human population in several urban and rural settings in Japan has led to government plans to prevent species reestablishment or remove recolonized animals capable of increasing human-wildlife conflict.

== Hawaii ==
The urban birdlife of Hawaii is dominated by introduced species, with native species largely remaining only in preserved areas.

== New Zealand ==
The birdlife in the most urban parts of New Zealand is dominated by introduced species, with bush fragments in the less urbanized areas allowing native species to cohabit.

== India ==
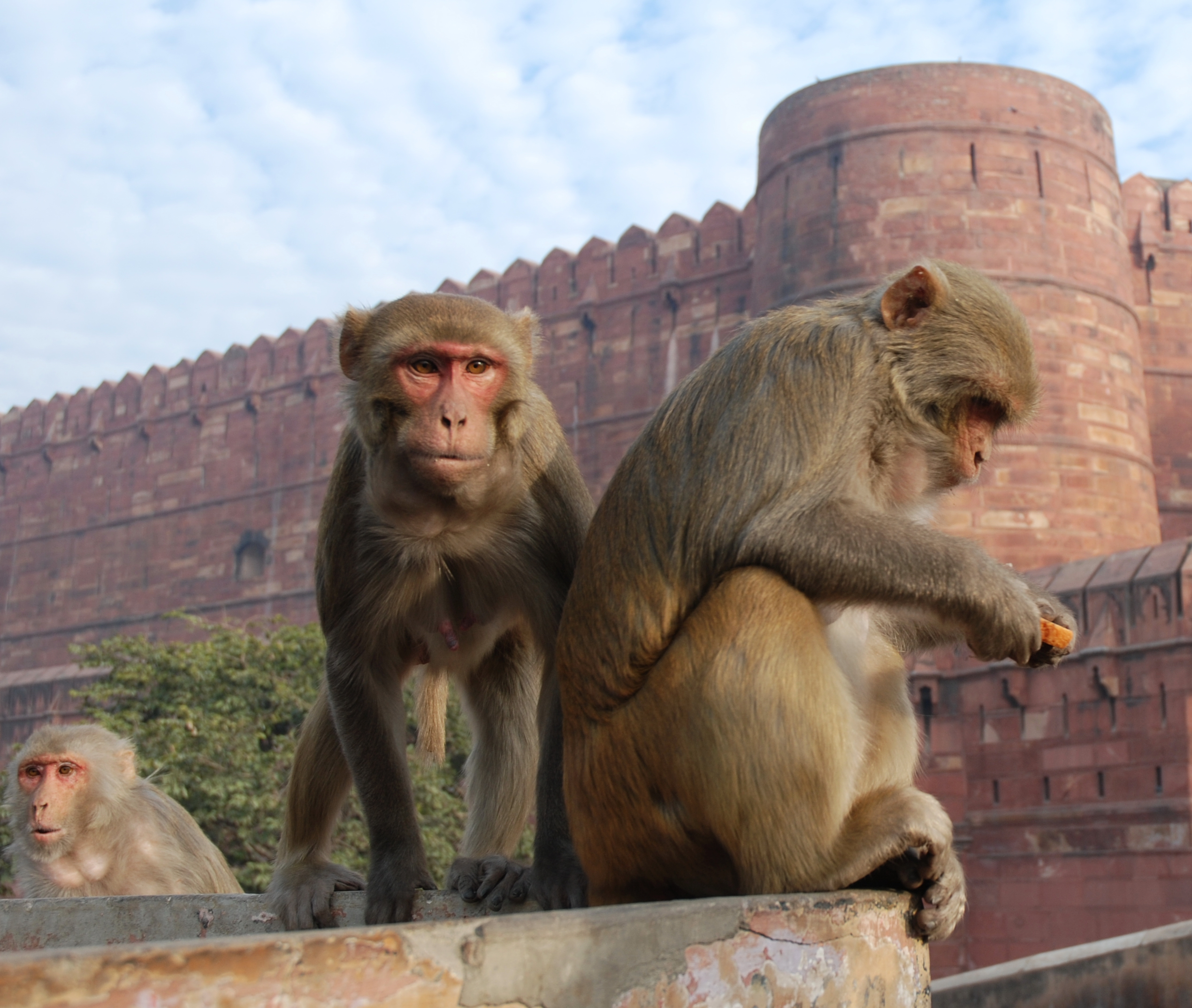
Rhesus macaques in Agra, northern India

In parts of India, monkeys, such as langurs, have been known to enter cities for food and cause havoc in food markets when they steal fruit from vendors. In Mumbai, leopards have been reported to enter neighbourhoods surrounding Sanjay Gandhi National Park and kill several people; the park itself is besieged by a surrounding burgeoning population as poaching and illegal woodcutting is rife there. In Mount Abu, Rajasthan, sloth bears have grown accustomed to entering the town throughout the year to feed on hotel waste in open rubbish bins and injure several people each year in chance encounters.

Persisting green patches have helped retain over 100 bird species in Delhi. Additionally, ponds have been identified which contribute to support a highly diverse bird community. This is supported partly by management interventions which have included islands and greening around the wetlands to make the wetlands themselves attractive for people. Ponds constitute 0.5% of the city's land area but support 37% of all bird species ever documented there, suggesting that even highly populated cities can be important bird refuges if small habitat patches are retained.

A large number of waterbirds nest on trees in Indian cities, benefitting from people's positive attitudes towards the birds despite the noise and smell around such breeding sites. The painted stork (Mycteria leucocephala) breeding colonies in the National Zoological Park in Delhi have been studied for over three decades. Small cities in India frequently retain substantial green cover, enabling the nesting of large numbers of waterbirds, especially the more common/widespread species of egrets like western cattle egrets (Bubulcus ibis) and little egrets (Egretta garzetta). Small cities with artificial wetlands can support substantial numbers of a diverse community of roosting and nesting waterbirds, like in the city of Udaipur, Rajasthan, where artificial large lakes were constructed to help cool the city during the summertime. Waterbird species nesting in these lakes include several herons like the Indian pond heron (Ardeola grayii) and the cattle egret, storks like the Asian openbill (Anastomus oscitans), and ibises like the red-naped ibis (Pseudibis papillosa). In the city of Pune, bird diversity is being negatively impacted by the spread of an exotic invasive tree, Prosopis juliflora. The patchwork of vegetation (both native and exotic) alongside natural relief and associated habitats such as scrub and grasslands, when juxtaposed with urban elements such as open plots readied for development, can create conditions to support a relatively large number of bird species such as in Udaipur city, India. It appears more likely for such conducive conditions for birds to be created in smaller cities due to their retaining green patches and other more natural aspects relative to the much more heavily urbanized larger cities.

== Europe ==
Many towns in the United Kingdom have urban wildlife groups that work to preserve and encourage urban wildlife. One example is Oxford.

=== Outside ===
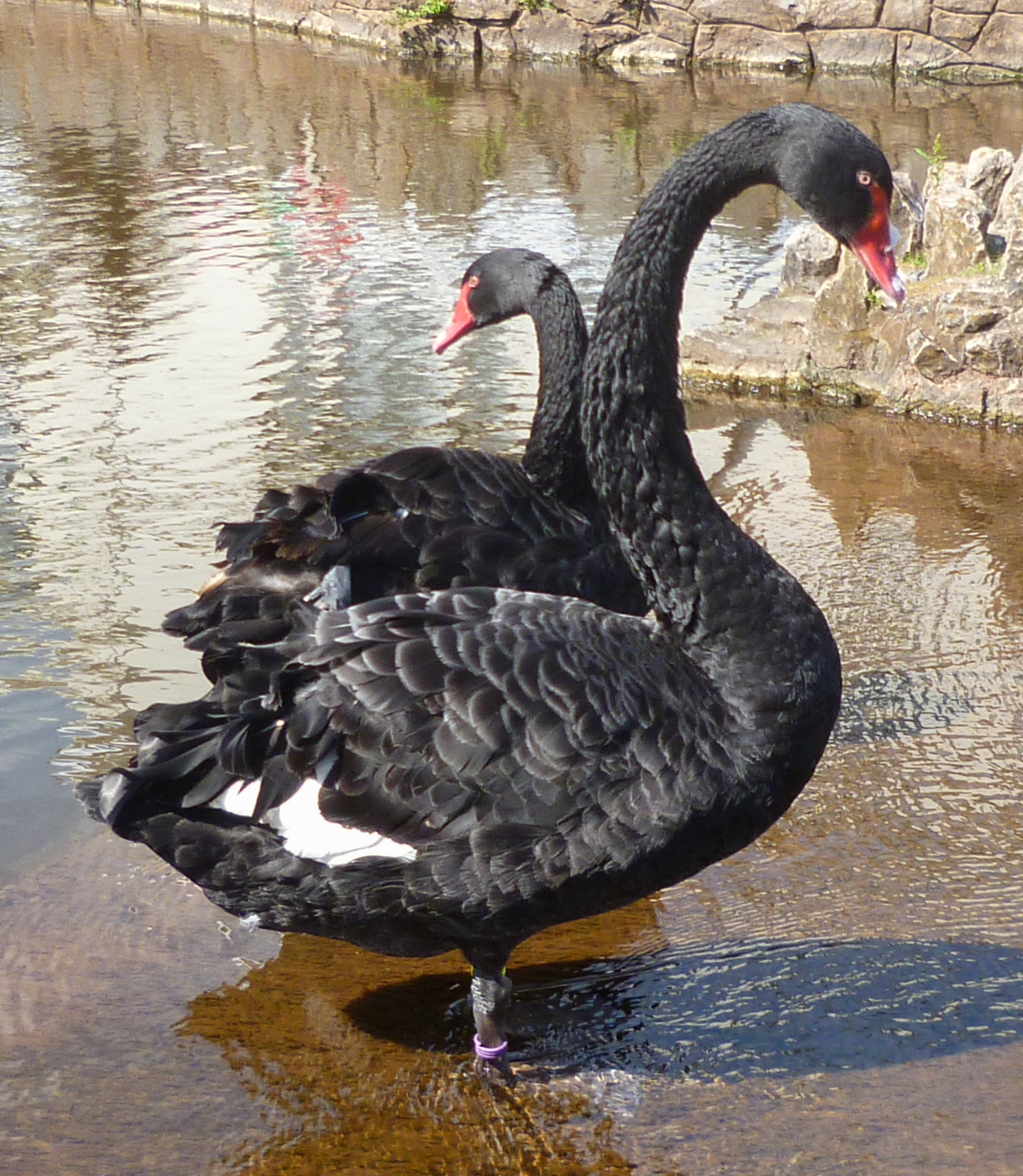
An introduced wild population of black swans (Cygnus atratus), originally being native to Australia, have become a prominent symbol of the town of Dawlish, Devon in the United Kingdom.

Urban areas range from fully urban – areas having little green space and mostly covered by paving, tarmac, or buildings – to suburban areas with gardens and parks. Pigeons are found scavenging on scraps of food left by humans and nesting on buildings, even in the most urban areas, as the tall buildings resemble their natural rocky homes in the mountains. Rats can also be found scavenging on food. Gulls of various types also breed and scavenge in various U.K. cities. A study by bird biologist Peter Rock – Europe's leading authority on urban gulls – on the rise of herring gulls and lesser black-backed gulls in Bristol has discovered that in 20 years the city's colony has grown from about 100 pairs to more than 1,200. From a gull's point of view, buildings are simply cliff-sided islands, with no predators and much nearby food. The trend is the same in places as far apart as Gloucester and Aberdeen. With an endless supply of food, more city chicks survive each year, and become accustomed to urban living. They in turn breed even more birds, with less reason to undertake a winter migration.

Waterfowl such as ducks, coots, geese, swans, and moorhens thrive in gardens and parks with access to water. Small populations can form around fountains and other ornamental features, far from natural bodies of water, provided there are adequate amounts of food such as aquatic plants growing in the fountain.

In the United Kingdom, improvements in water quality in urban areas have coincided with reintroduction and conservation projects for the Eurasian otter, resulting in frequent sightings of these animals in urban and suburban environments. Otters have been recorded in settlements of a variety of sizes, ranging from large towns and small cities such as Andover, Inverness and Exeter, to major cities such as London, Manchester, Birmingham and Edinburgh.

A study was conducted on great tits living in ten European cities and ten nearby forests in which an analysis was made of the way the birds used songs to attract mates and establish territorial boundaries. Hans Slabbekoorn of Leiden University in the Netherlands said that city birds adapt to life by singing faster, shorter and higher-pitched songs in cities compared to forests. The forest birds sing low and slow. Great tits living in noisy cities have to compete with the low-frequency sounds of heavy traffic, which means their songs go up in pitch to make themselves heard. A bird that sang like Barry White in the forest sounded more like Michael Jackson in the city. A similar study conducted by Middlesex University in 2004 found that urban mallard populations in London had adapted their calls to counter anthropogenic noise, being much louder and more 'vocally excitable' compared to a rural population in Cornwall, with this phenomenon being akin to regional accents among humans.

The advent of these animals has also drawn a predator, as peregrine falcons have also been known to nest in urban areas, nesting on tall buildings and preying on pigeons. The peregrine falcon is becoming more nocturnal in urban environments, using urban lighting to spot its prey. This has provided them with new opportunities to hunt night-flying birds and bats. Red foxes are also in many urban and suburban areas in the U.K. as scavengers. They scavenge and eat insects and small vertebrates such as pigeons and rodents. People also leave food for them to eat in their gardens. One red fox was even found living at the top of the then-partially completed Shard in 2011, having climbed the stairwell to reach its temporary home some 72 stories above ground.

In some cases, even large animals have been found living in cities. Berlin has wild boars. Wild roe deer are becoming increasingly common in green areas in Scottish towns and cities, such as in the Easterhouse suburb of Glasgow. Urban waterways can also contain wildlife, including large animals. In London, since improvements in water quality in the Thames, seals and porpoises have been seen in its waters in the center of the city.

=== Inside houses ===
Numerous animals can also live within buildings. Insects that sometimes inhabit buildings include various species of small beetles such as ladybirds, which often seek refuge inside buildings during the winter months, as well as cockroaches and houseflies.

== North America ==
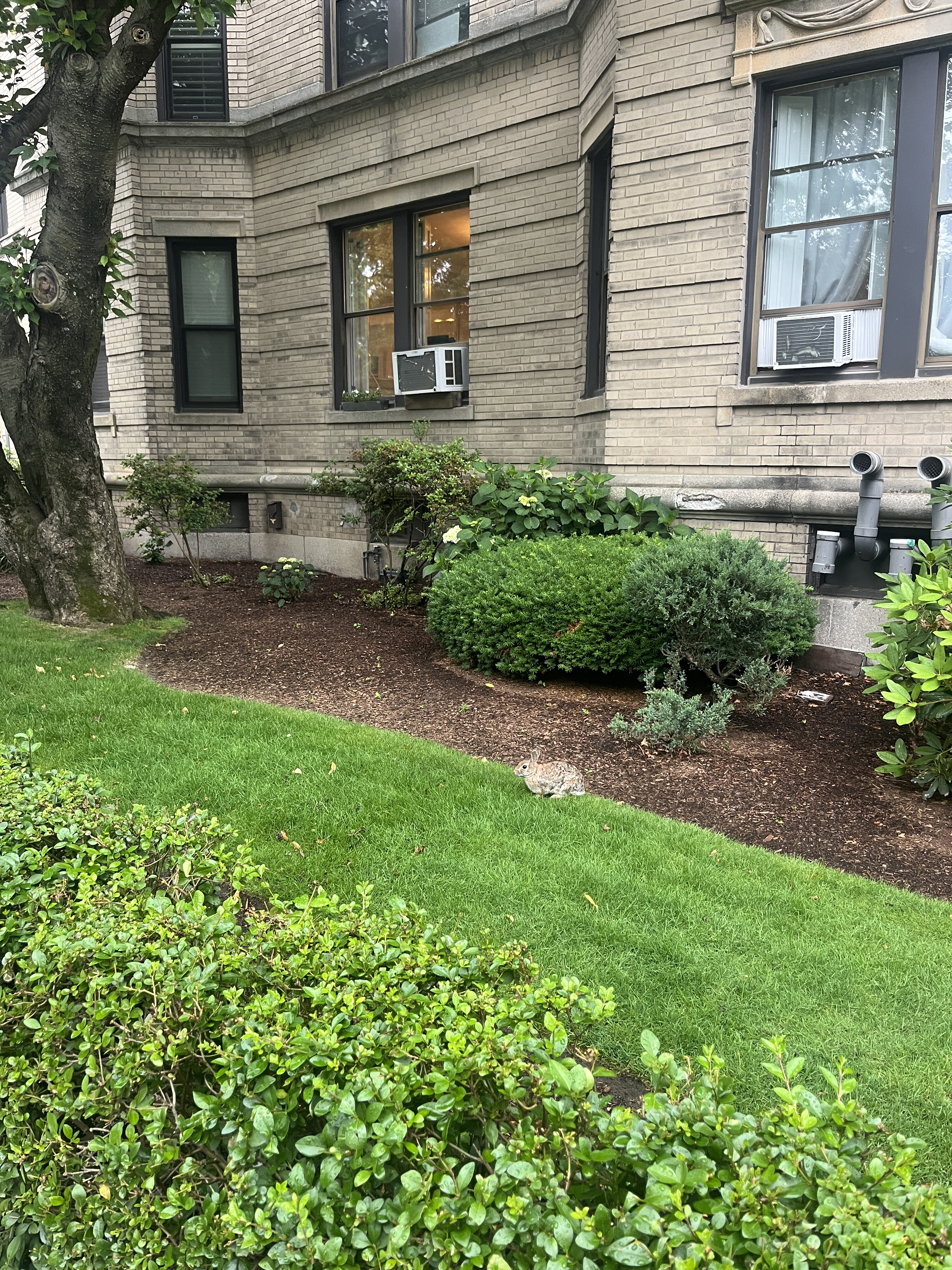
Eastern cottontail rabbit in Fenway Neighborhood of Boston

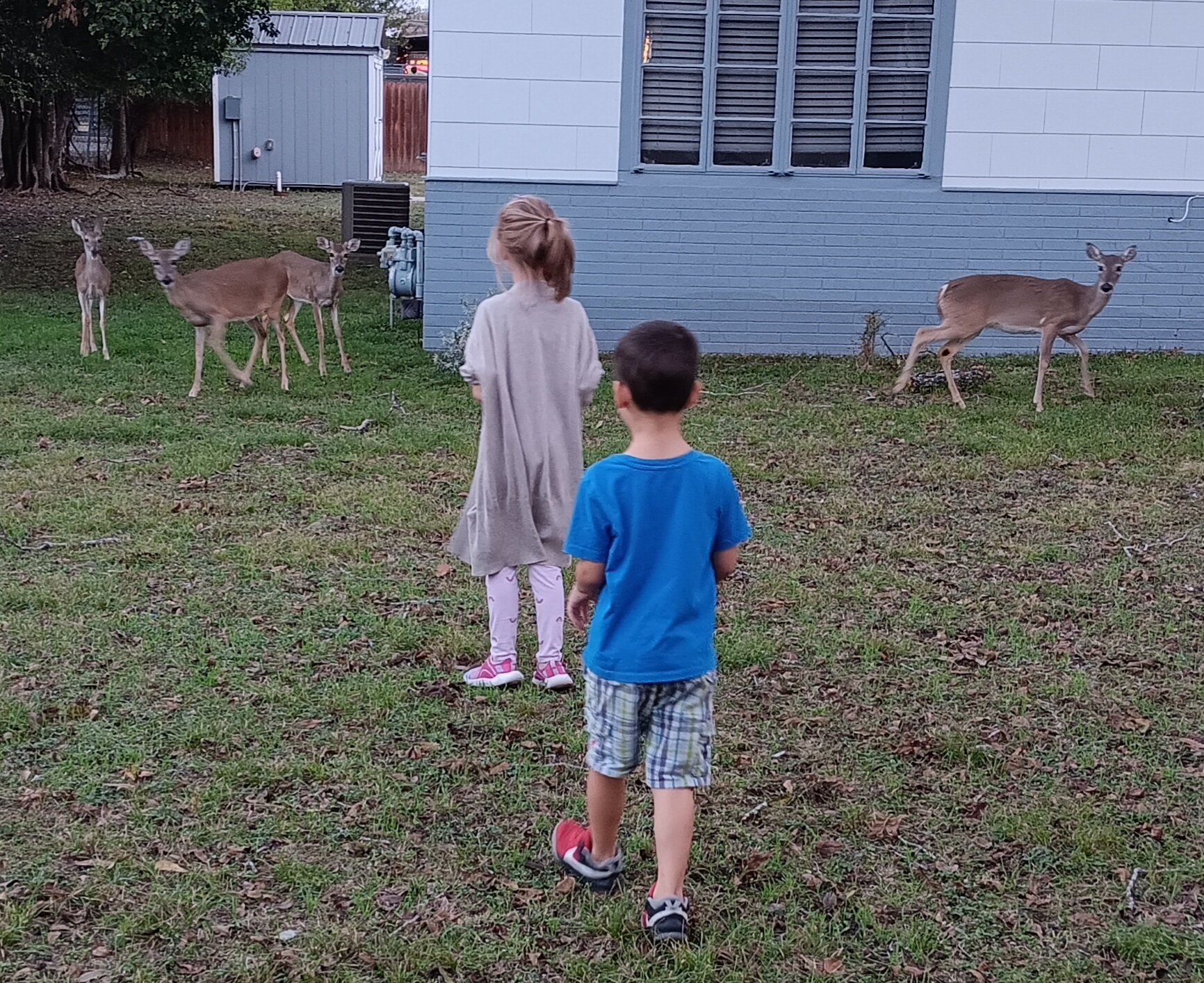
Wild deer in New Braunfels, Texas.

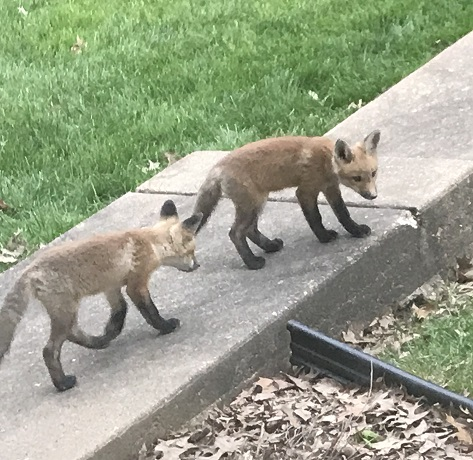
Fox cubs in St. Louis, Missouri.

Many North American species have successfully adapted to urban and suburban environments and are thriving. Typical examples include urban coyotes, the top predator of such regions. Other common urban animals include predators such as (especially) red foxes, grey foxes, and bobcats that prey on small animals such as rodents. Omnivores such as raccoons, Virginia opossums, and striped skunks are abundant, but seldom seen, due to their elusive and nocturnal nature. In the south and southeastern United States and Mexico, the nine-banded armadillo also fills this niche, but due to the armadillo's lack of thick fur, they are unable to thrive in more northern climates. Squirrels, including the American red squirrel, fox squirrel, and especially the eastern grey squirrel are extremely common in areas with enough trees. Herbivores forage in the early morning and evening, with cottontail rabbits, and, in dryer parts of the country, jackrabbits, as well as the two most common deer species in North America: the white-tailed deer and the mule deer. Shy of humans, deer are often spotted as a mother with fawns, or a lone buck creeping through the trees and bushes. As whitetails prefer forest edge and meadow to actual dense forest, the cutting of forests has actually made more habitat for the white-tailed deer, which has increased its numbers beyond what they were at when Europeans arrived in America. In some cities, older deer seem to have learned how to cross streets, as they look back and forth looking for cars while crossing roads, while fawns and younger deer will recklessly run out without looking; most traffic accidents involving deer happen with deer that have just left their mother, and are less likely to watch for cars.

Red-tailed hawks are a common sight in urban areas, with individuals such as Pale Male being documented nesting and raising chicks in New York City since at least the 1990s.

The American alligator, a once-threatened species that was saved from extinction through farming and conservation, can frequently be found in the southern United States living in open areas with access to water, such as golf courses and parks, in its native range.

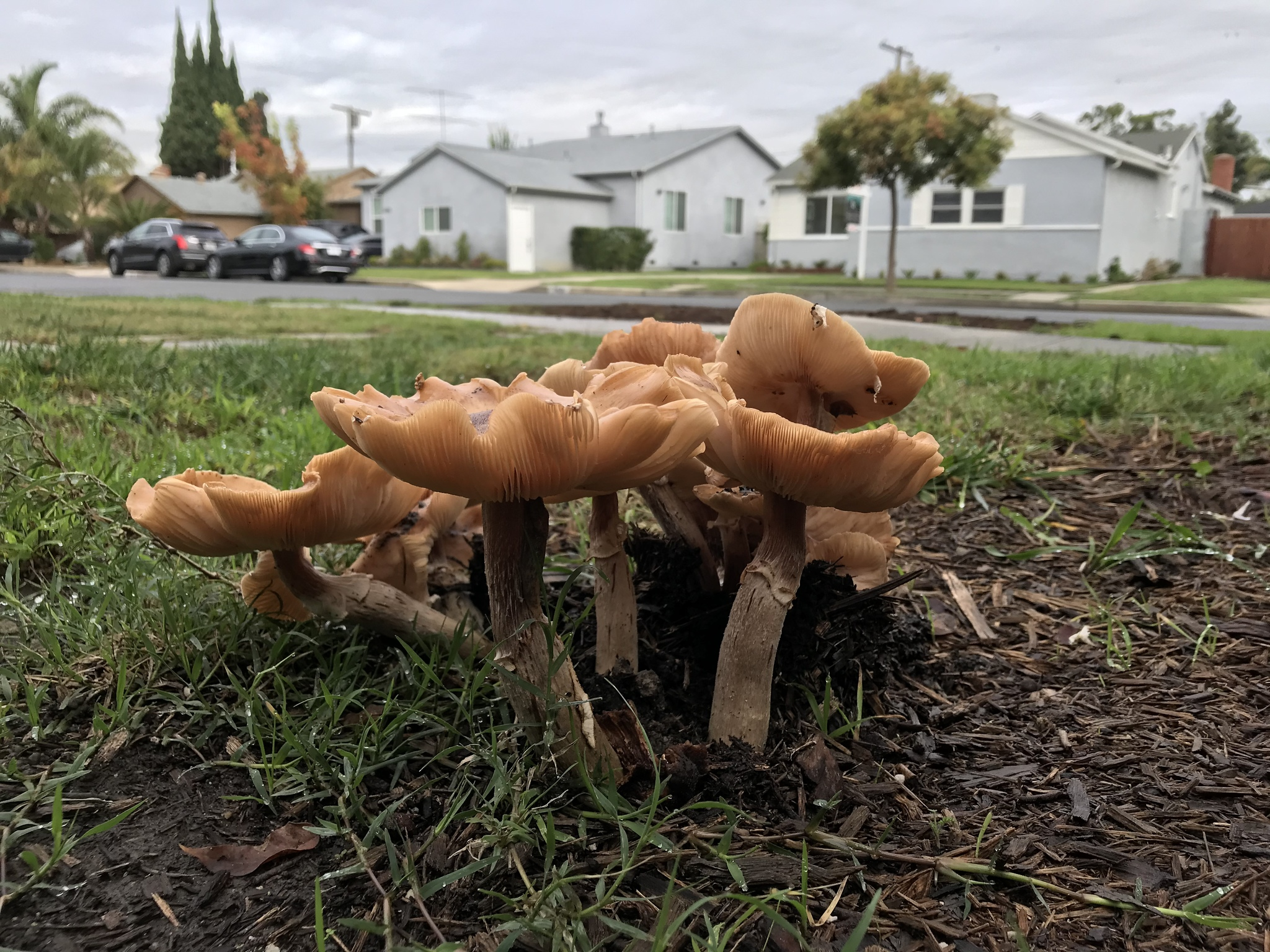
Fungi are an understudied aspect of urban ecology

These animals living in urban areas usually come into conflict with humans, as some of them will open garbage bags in search of food, eat food left out for pets, prey on unattended pets, feed on prized garden plants, dig up lawns or become traffic hazards when they run out into the road. There are media accounts of alligators being found in sewer pipes and storm drains, but so-called "sewer alligators" are unlikely to sustain a breeding population in such environments, due to a lack of a place to bury their eggs and food. Urban wildlife is often considered a nuisance, with local governments being tasked to manage the issue.

In 2009, a large blobby mass made of colonies of tubifex worms was found to be living in the sewers of Raleigh, North Carolina. Revealed by a snake camera inspection of sewer piping under the Cameron Village shopping center, videos of the creature went viral on YouTube in 2009 under the name "Carolina poop monster".

Animals known to dwell within human habitations in the US include house centipedes (Scutigera coleoptrata) and firebrats.

== South America ==
Marmosets and capuchin monkeys can be found living wild in city parks in Brazil. Urban-dwelling marmosets tend to return more often to the same sleeping sites than jungle-dwelling marmosets. Urban-dwelling marmosets tend to prefer to sleep in tall trees with high branches and smooth bark. It has been suggested they do this to avoid cats. Human-wildlife conflicts in urban areas are increasing in several South American countries, with species that include jaguars, pumas, capybaras, and wild boars. Urban expansion has led to a novel and underreported challenge to wildlife: an increase in the demand for wild meat that includes several taxa such as birds, turtles, small mammals and caimans.

== See also ==
- Urban ecology
- Urban welfare ecology
- Wild animal suffering
