= Water availability =

Water availability may refer to:

- the availability of global water resources
- water activity
