= Baddeck (disambiguation) =

Baddeck is a village in Nova Scotia, Canada.

Baddeck may also refer to:

- Baddeck River, Nova Scotia, Canada
- Forks Baddeck, Nova Scotia, Nova Scotia, Canada
- Baddeck (Crown Jewel) Airport
- HMCS Baddeck, one of multiple ships of the same name
- Canadian Aerodrome Baddeck No. 1 and No. 2, two early aircraft designs
- Baddeck Academy
- Baddeck, And That Sort of Thing, novel by Charles Dudley Warner
- Baddeck the Buoy Boat, a character from the TV series Theodore Tugboat
