= Telegraph House =

Historic hotel in Nova Scotia, Canada

The Telegraph House
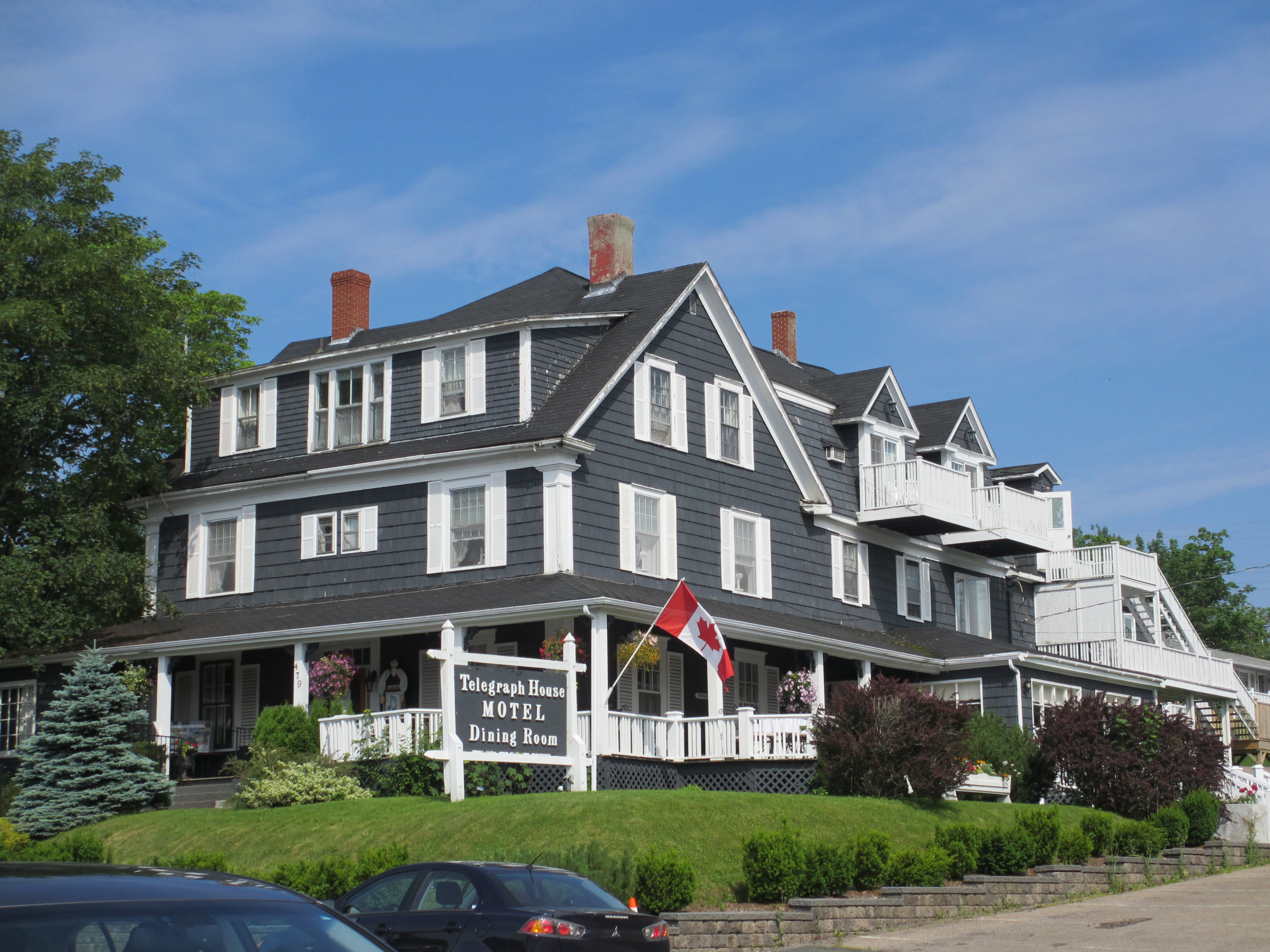
- The Telegraph House Motel.
- Interactive map of the The Telegraph House area

General information
- Location: 479 Chebucto Street, Baddeck, NS, Canada
- Coordinates: 46.100149°N 60.752564°W
- Completed: 1861
- Client: Dunlop Family

The Telegraph House is a historic hotel located in Baddeck, Nova Scotia.

== History ==
The hotel was built in 1861 and soon after housed the office of the first Trans-Oceanic Cable Company. The hotel first came to prominence after Joseph Twichell and Charles Dudley Warner stayed there in 1873. Warner subsequently detailed their stay in his book, Baddeck, And That Sort of Thing which was published the following year. Warner described the inn as a "very unhotel-like appearing hotel". Having read Warner's book, Alexander Graham Bell and his wife Mabel Gardiner Hubbard stayed at the Telegraph House on their visit to Baddeck in 1885. After returning to his home in Washington, D.C. Bell wrote to Kate Dunlop, the owner of the Telegraph House, telling them that they wished to acquire a cottage for their return the following year. Dunlop put Bell into contact with Arthur McCurdy (father of John Alexander Douglas McCurdy) who helped Bell purchase a local property. Bell's room has been preserved in the hotel, remaining much the same is it did during his visit.

== See also ==
- Historic Buildings in Baddeck, Nova Scotia
- History of Baddeck
