= Saint Peter's and Saint John's Anglican Church =

Church in Nova Scotia, Canada

Coordinates: 46.0977°N 60.7557°W

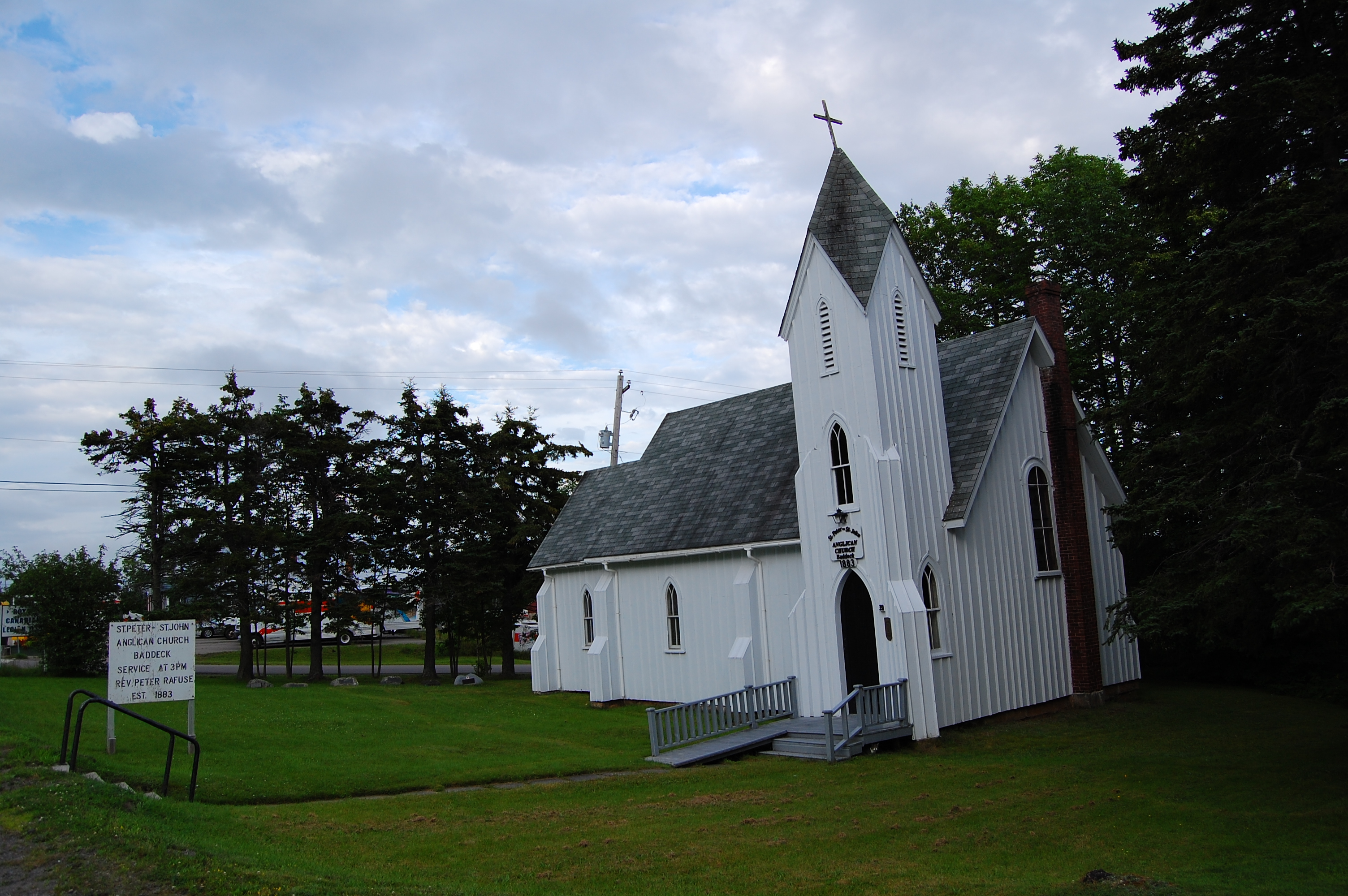
- Interactive map of the Saint Peter's and Saint John's Anglican Church area

General information
- Architectural style: Cambridge Camden Society, Neo-Gothic
- Location: Shore Road, Baddeck, NS, Canada
- Construction started: 1883
- Completed: 1883

Technical details
- Structural system: Wood board and batten

Design and construction
- Architect: Simon Gibbons

Nova Scotia Heritage Property Act
- Designated: August 15, 1990
- Reference no.: 00PNS0124

Saint Peter's and Saint John's Anglican Church is an historic building in Baddeck, Nova Scotia. The church is one of only four remaining churches designed by Reverend Simon Gibbons, Canada's first Inuk priest. Built in 1883, the church is the second of six churches built by Gibbons in Nova Scotia.

It is believed that Gibbons first came into contact with the Cambridge Camden Society while building Saint Peter's and Saint John's Anglican Church. St. Peter's and St. John's was designated a Provincially Registered Property under the Heritage Property Act in 1990 due to its connection to Gibbons and because it best exemplifies the style of the Cambridge Camden society which advocated a return to simple Medieval styles. Typical of neo-Gothic architecture, the wooden church features buttresses, pointed arch windows, and a round-headed window on the east elevation.

The church has been deconsecrated.

== See also ==
- Historic Buildings in Baddeck, Nova Scotia
- History of Baddeck
