= Simon Gibbons (priest) =

First Canadian Inuk Anglican priest (1851–1896)

The Reverend Simon Gibbons

Missionary
- Born: 21 June 1851; Forteau, Newfoundland and Labrador
- Died: 14 December 1896 (aged 45); Parrsboro, Nova Scotia
- Spouse: Frances Eliza DuVernet
- Venerated in: Anglican Church of Canada
- Feast: 14 December

Simon Gibbons (June 21, 1851 - December 14, 1896) was Canada's first Inuk priest. The Anglican missionary constructed a number of churches in Nova Scotia.

== Early life ==
Simon Gibbons is believed to have been born at Forteau, Newfoundland and Labrador, on June 21, 1851, to Thomas Gibbons, a fisherman, and an Inuk woman who died giving birth. Some stories, possibly legends later circulated by Gibbons, have him found as a child on an ice-floe off the coast of Labrador. The first document about Gibbons shows him as a six-year-old child admitted to the Church of England Widows and Orphans Asylum in St John's in 1857 upon the death of his father, along with three brothers and a sister in law. Three years later, Gibbons entered a school run by the Reverend George Poulett Harris, and the promising student was also taught by a Reverend Mr Hutchinson at Tilt Cove. In 1862, Gibbons was taken off the orphanage rolls, because he was taken by a clergy widow, Sophia Mountain, lady superintendent of the asylum. In 1867 she married Edward Feild, Bishop of Newfoundland. In 1875, Gibbons moved to Quebec to work as a lay reader, teacher and catechist, as well as to tutor the son of the Clarenceville rector for admission to the university. There he met Frances Eliza DuVernet, the rector's daughter, whom he would later marry.

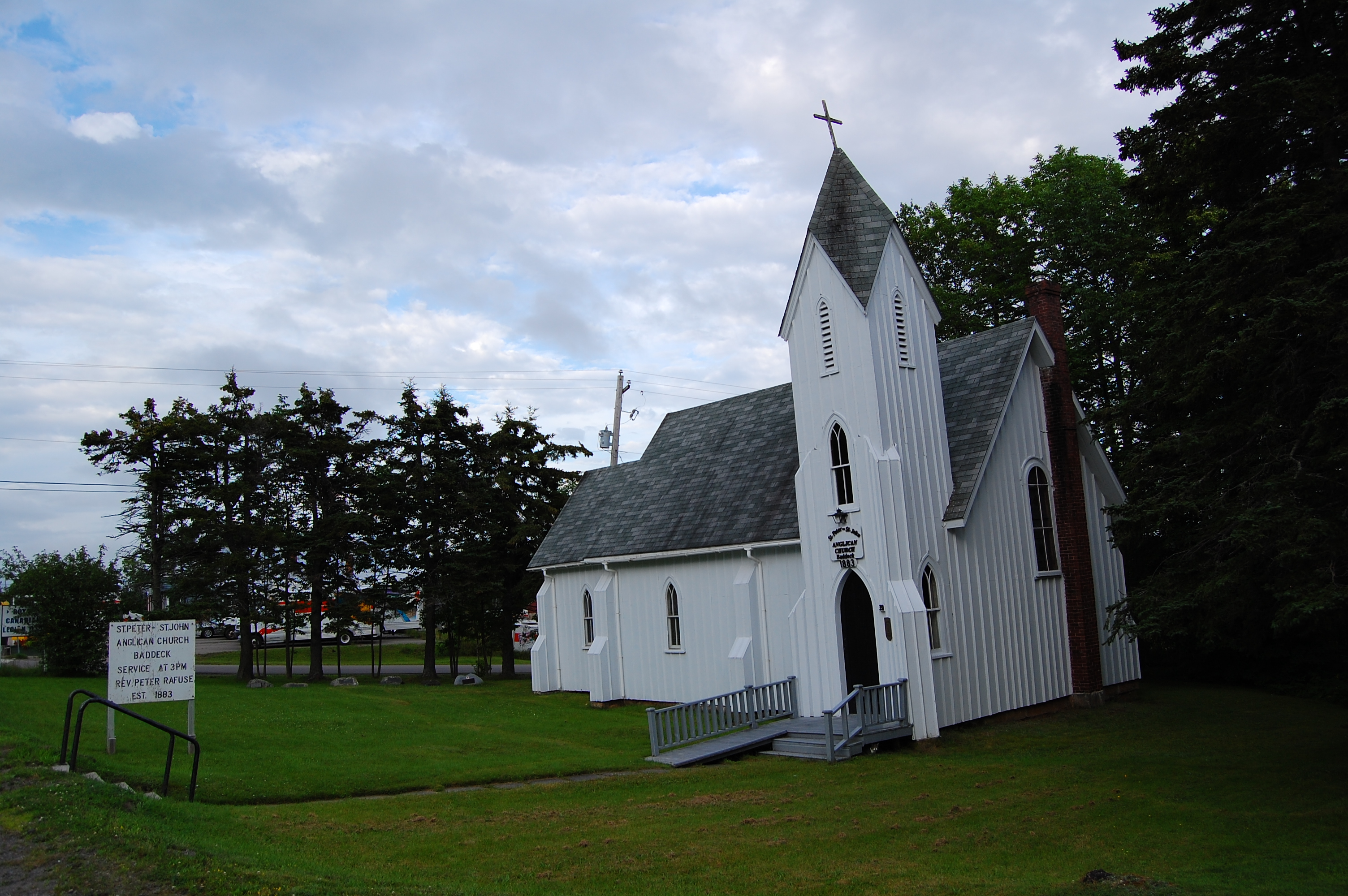
Saint Peter's and Saint John's Anglican Church, constructed by Gibbons in 1883

== Priesthood ==
Gibbons attended King's College at Windsor, Nova Scotia from 1876 to 1877, studying for the priesthood. Bishop Hibbert Binney ordained Gibbons a deacon on February 25, 1877, and a priest on March 25 the following year. He became a travelling missionary in Victoria County on Cape Breton Island. He served the many fishermen there and their families, often travelling using snowshoes in conditions too severe for horse and wagon or sleigh. Gibbons became known for his education, intellect and sense of humour, as well as his physical stamina and endurance.

In 1881 and 1882, Gibbons travelled to England to solicit funds to build churches in his district, preaching in Westminster Abbey and being introduced to Queen Victoria. He laconically stated "my face was my fortune", alluding to what Canon Morris referred to as his "Eskimo physique".

Upon returning in 1883, Gibbons built two churches and a mission house, as well as gave his bishop $4500 to endow the mission. One of the churches was Saint Peter's and Saint John's Anglican Church in Baddeck, Nova Scotia. In 1885, Gibbons traveled to the West Indies to regain his health, then was relocated to the parish of Lockeport, Nova Scotia where he served three congregations in a circuit along 35 miles of coastline. In 1888, after another trip to Britain to secure funding, Gibbons again relocated, this time to Parrsboro, where he oversaw the construction of three churches.

== Architecture ==
Gibbons may have visited Cambridge during his visits to England. The churches that he subsequently built in Canada reflect the style of the Cambridge Camden Society. His churches were designed in a simple style, reminiscent of medieval European churches but using wood rather than stone. A distinctive feature of his churches, is the use of Rhenish helm, or Rhineland helmet, bell towers.

== Death and legacy ==
Gibbons died on December 14, 1896, in Parrsboro, where he was buried. The Canadian Calendar of Holy Persons of the Anglican Church of Canada remembers Gibbons on the anniversary of his death, December 14. In 2013, an inukshuk was raised to honour the missionary on the Diligent River where he worked in his final years.
