= HMCS Camrose =

Flower-class corvette

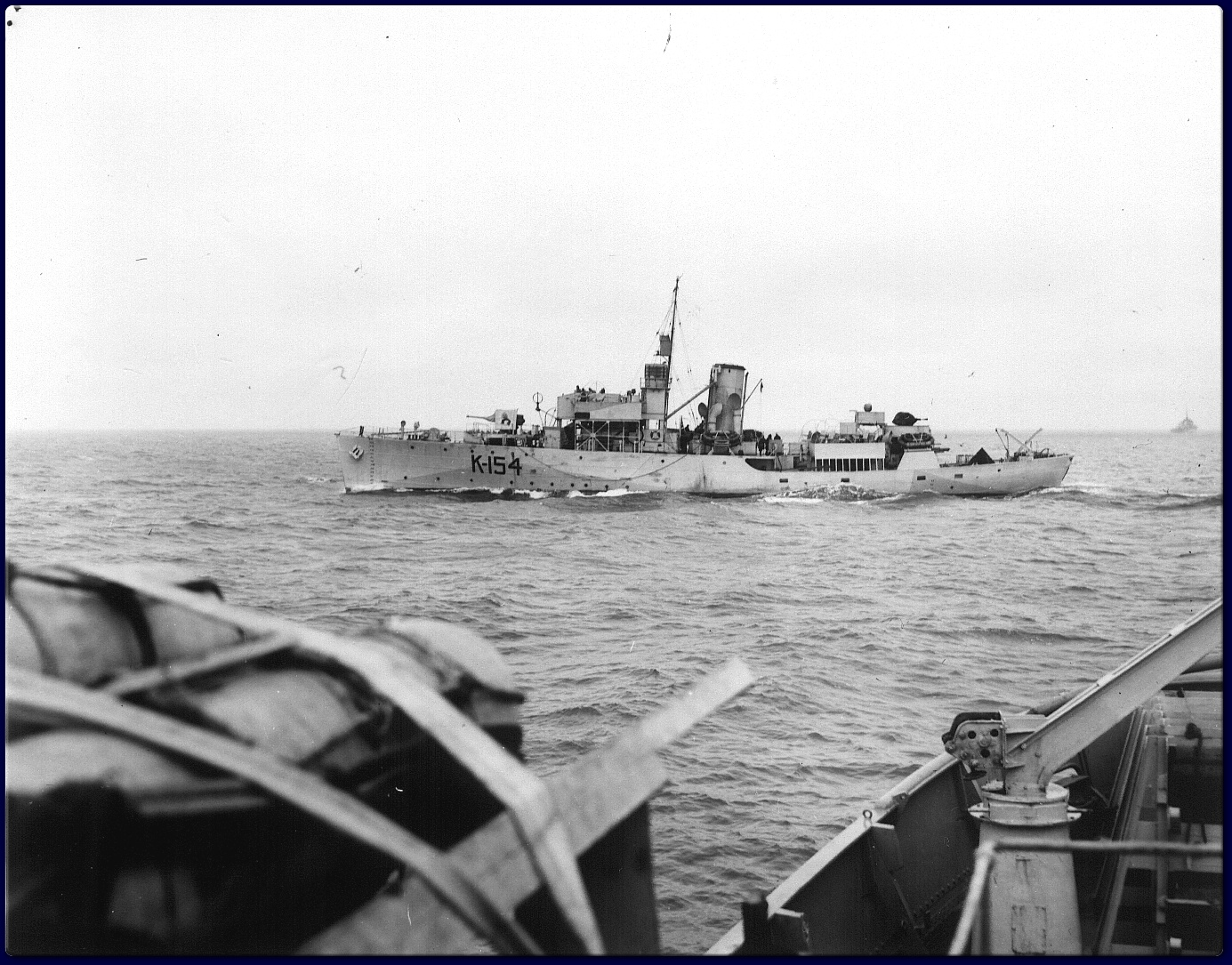
- HMCS Camrose, c. November 1943

History

Canada
- Name: Camrose
- Namesake: Camrose, Alberta
- Ordered: 22 January 1940
- Builder: Marine Industries Ltd., Sorel
- Laid down: 17 February 1940
- Launched: 16 November 1940
- Commissioned: 30 June 1941
- Decommissioned: 22 July 1945
- Identification: Pennant number: K154
- Honours and awards: Atlantic 1941-45, Normandy 1944, North Sea 1944, Gulf of St. Lawrence 1944, English Channel 1945
- Fate: Scrapped at Hamilton, Ontario

General characteristics
- Class & type: Flower-class corvette
- Displacement: 925 long tons (940 t)
- Length: 205 ft (62.48 m) o/a
- Beam: 33 ft (10.06 m)
- Draught: 11.5 ft (3.51 m)
- Propulsion: single shaft; 2 × fire tube Scotch boilers; 1 × 4-cylinder triple-expansion reciprocating steam engine; 2,750 ihp (2,050 kW)
- Speed: 16 knots (29.6 km/h)
- Range: 3,500 nautical miles (6,482 km) at 12 knots (22.2 km/h)
- Complement: 85
- Sensors & processing systems: 1 × SW1C or 2C radar; 1 × Type 123A or Type 127DV sonar
- Armament: 1 × BL 4 in (102 mm) Mk.IX gun; 2 × .50 cal machine gun (twin); 2 × Lewis .303 cal machine gun (twin); 2 × Mk.II depth charge throwers; 2 × depth charge rails with 40 depth charges

HMCS Camrose was a Royal Canadian Navy Flower-class corvette which took part in convoy escort duties during the Second World War. She was named for Camrose, Alberta. The ship was built by Marine Industries at their shipyard with the vessel's keel being laid down on 17 September 1940, launched on 16 November 1940 and commissioned on 30 June 1941. The corvette primarily fought in the Battle of the Atlantic as a convoy escort, but also took in convoy operations in the Mediterranean Sea, North Sea, English Channel and coastal Canadian waters and supported the Allied invasions of Normandy and North Africa. In January 1944, Camrose and a British frigate joined forces to sink a German U-boat. Following the war, Camrose was paid off on 22 July 1945 and sold for scrap in 1946 at Hamilton, Ontario.

== Design and description ==
Flower-class corvettes such as Camrose serving with the Royal Canadian Navy (RCN) in the Second World War were different from earlier and more traditional sail-driven corvettes. The Flower-class corvettes originated from a need that arose in 1938 to expand the Royal Navy following the Munich Crisis. A design request went out for a small escort for coastal convoys. Based on a traditional whaler-type design, the initial Canadian ships of the Flower class had a standard displacement of 950 long tons (970 t). They were 205 feet 1 inch (62.51 m) long overall with a beam of 33 feet 1 inch (10.08 m) and a maximum draught of 13 feet 5 inches (4.09 m). The initial 1939–1940 corvettes were powered by a four-cylinder vertical triple expansion engine powered by steam from two Scotch boilers turning one three-bladed propeller rated at 2,800 indicated horsepower (2,100 kW). The Scotch boilers were replaced with water-tube boilers in later 1939–1940 and 1940–1941 Programme ships. The corvettes had a maximum speed of 16 knots (30 km/h; 18 mph). This gave them a range of 3,450 nautical miles (6,390 km; 3,970 mi) at 12 knots (22 km/h; 14 mph). The vessels were extremely wet.

The Canadian Flower-class vessels were initially armed with a Mk IX BL 4-inch (102 mm) gun forward on a CP 1 mounting and carried 100 rounds per gun. The corvettes were also armed with a QF Vickers 2-pounder (40 mm, 1.6 in) gun on a bandstand aft, two single-mounted .303 Vickers machine guns or Browning 0.5-calibre machine guns for anti-aircraft defence and two twin-mounted .303 Lewis machine guns, usually sited on bridge wings. For anti-submarine warfare, they mounted two depth charge throwers and initially carried 25 depth charges. The corvettes were designed with a Type 123 ASDIC sonar set installed. The Flower-class ships had a complement of 47 officers and ratings. The Royal Canadian Navy initially ordered 54 corvettes in 1940 and these were fitted with Mark II Oropesa minesweeping gear used for destroying contact mines. Part of the depth charge rails were made portable so the minesweeping gear could be utilised.

== Construction and career ==
Camrose was ordered on 22 January 1940 as part of the 1939–1940 Flower-class building programme. The corvette was laid down by Marine Industries at their shipyard in Sorel, Quebec on 17 September 1940. She was launched on 16 November 1940 and commissioned 30 June 1941 at Sorel.

The ship then sailed for Halifax, Nova Scotia after being assigned to Halifax Force in July 1941. Camrose was transferred to Newfoundland Command in October of that year. On 5 October 1941, convoy SC 48 departed Sydney, Nova Scotia, joined by the escorting destroyer HMCS Columbia and seven corvettes including Camrose, making her first convoy trip across the Atlantic Ocean. Columbia, Camrose, and three other corvettes joined the escort off Newfoundland. The weather was extremely poor and in the lack of visibility, two of the corvettes lost contact with the convoy. Camrose too lost contact with the convoy, but came upon two of the merchant ships that had become separated from the main group. The three ships came across the westbound convoy ON 23 and received information on the general area of SC 48 on 14 October, but remained separated for another day and a half. During their separation, SC 48 came under concerted attack by German U-boats. Camrose rejoined the convoy, leaving the two ships she was escorting, in order to reinforce Columbia and the remaining corvettes. SC 48 lost nine merchant ships and two of the corvettes, with a supporting American destroyer, USS Kearny, severely damaged. (Note: Kearny was the first American warship to be damaged by German forces.) In January 1942, while escorting a pair of merchant ships from St. John's to Halifax alongside HMCS Wetaskiwin, the four ships came under attack by the U-boat U-203. The submarine fired three torpedoes but missed with all of them. The submarine slipped away before Camrose and Wetaskiwin could actively hunt the U-boat. Camrose remained as an ocean escort for convoys from St. John's to Iceland until February 1942 when she was laid up for a refit at Lunenburg, Nova Scotia. Upon her return to active service, she returned to Newfoundland Command.

In June 1942 she was reassigned to the Western Local Escort Force (WLEF). WLEF was tasked with taking those merchant ships from transatlantic convoys that usually dispersed off Newfoundland and escorting them into Canadian ports to prevent German U-boat attacks on unprotected merchant vessels. In October that year she was among a number of Canadian corvettes sent to the United Kingdom to take on escort duties for convoys supplying Operation Torch. While en route to the United Kingdom, Camrose's convoy, SC 106, was redirected northward after two other convoys were attacked by U-boat wolfpacks. Based at Londonderry, under the command of Commander-in-Chief, Western Approaches, Camrose was assigned to the Third Canadian Corvette Group (CEG 27). The corvettes escorted convoys from the United Kingdom to Gibraltar. In January 1943, Camrose was among the Canadian corvettes assigned to Gibraltar in an exchange between commands, with several British sloops returning to Western Approaches Command. From Gibraltar, the Canadian corvettes escorted convoys in the Mediterranean Sea. While escorting convoy KMS 8 to Bône, Algeria, Italian submarines attacked the convoy on 6/7 February. Camrose spotted one of the submarines on the surface and attempted to ram the vessel, firing her 4-inch gun simultaneously. The corvette scored a hit on the submarine, but did not sink her. By March, Camrose had returned to Canada. In April she was sent for another refit, this time at Pictou, Nova Scotia, only returning to active service after five months, during which Camrose received her forecastle extension. Upon completion of her workups, she was assigned to the escort group EG 6 and returned to Londonderry in December. During this time she escorted convoys from the United Kingdom to Gibraltar or Freetown, Sierra Leone.

In January 1944, the Germans, changed tactics; instead of using wolfpacks, they would send U-boats to hunt alone. U-757 was assigned a patrol area off West Africa. Mixed Convoy OS 64/KMS 38 was bound for Freetown, escorted by Camrose and the British Captain-class frigate HMS Bayntun when U-747 was detected by Bayntun's asdic. Bayntun and Camrose attacked the target six times between them and sank the submarine on 8 January 1944. In May Camrose was assigned to Western Approaches Command at Greenock in support of the invasion of Normandy. As part of her invasion duties, she escorted convoys to and from Normandy. On 12/13 June, German E-boats from the German 4th Flotilla sailing from Le Havre encountered HMCS Baddeck, Camrose, and Louisburg, which were protecting Mulberry harbour units in the English Channel. The E-boats were driven off with the aid of Allied fighter-bomber aircraft. In September 1944 she returned to Canada and went for another refit at Pictou. Upon her resumption of duties in January 1945 Camrose was made part of escort group EG 41 operating out of Plymouth. The corvette served with that group until VE-Day. Camrose took part in the reoccupation of St. Helier in the Channel Islands.

In June 1945 the corvette returned to Canada for good and on 22 July 1945 she was paid off at Sydney, Nova Scotia. Camrose was awarded the battle honours "Atlantic 1941–45", "Gulf of St. Lawrence 1944", "Normandy 1944", "North Sea 1944", and "English Channel 1945" for her service. After the war she was sold for scrapping in June 1947 and broken up at Hamilton, Ontario.
