= Bras d'Or House =

Coordinates: 46.099806°N 60.752050°W

- Interactive map of the Bras d'Or House area

General information
- Architectural style: Second Empire
- Location: 466 Chebucto Street, Baddeck, NS, Canada
- Construction started: 1894
- Completed: 1894
- Client: Alexander Anderson

Design and construction
- Engineer: Francis J. Cunningham

The Bras d'Or House is a historic building in Baddeck, Nova Scotia, Canada.

== History ==
The original Bras d'Or House was built around 1800 and housed a hotel operated by James Crowdis. The second owner was Robert Anderson and later his son Alexander Anderson took over the hotel. The building was destroyed by a fire in 1893 and the younger Anderson rebuilt the new Bras d'Or House on the same location the following year. Alexander Anderson operated the hotel until 1924. Between 1924 and 1946 the hotel went through several different owners before being purchased by Alton and Judy Langille who operated the hotel until 1958. In 1958 the building was purchased by George P. Fraser who converted the hotel into apartments. The present day building has undergone significant physical changes and currently houses a Chinese restaurant as well as apartments.

== Architecture ==
The original Bras d'Or House was constructed in the Georgian style, with two and a quarter storeys and a steeply pitched gable roof. The building featured an attached annex in the same style. The current Bras d'Or House was built as a three-storey building in the Second Empire style, with a mansard roof.

== Present Use ==
Since 1965 the building has housed a Chinese restaurant known as Wong's Bras d'Or House.

== See also ==
- Historic Buildings in Baddeck, Nova Scotia
- History of Baddeck
