= Gilbert H. Grosvenor Hall =

Historic building in Nova Scotia, Canada

Coordinates: 46.10076°N 60.74912°W

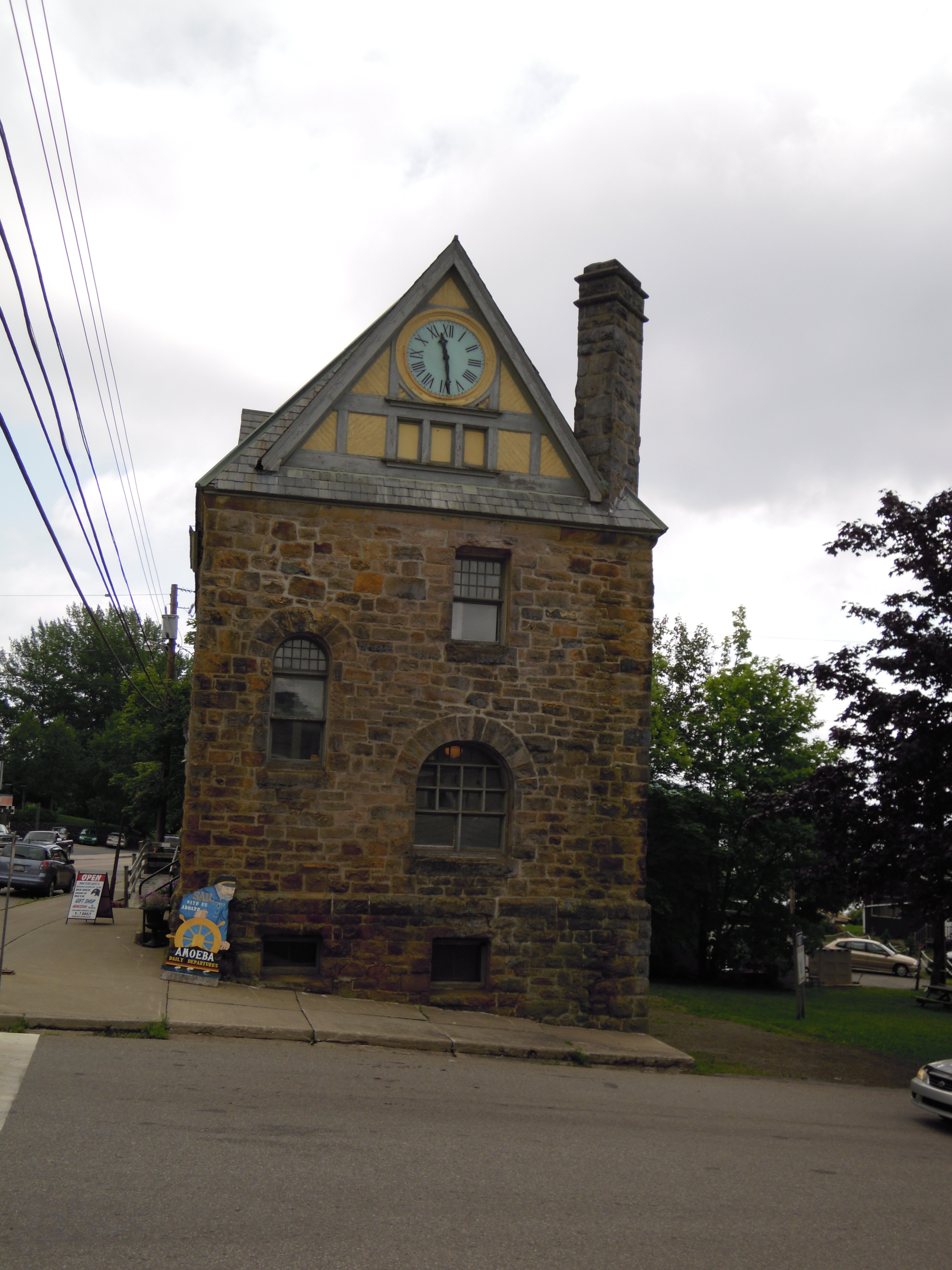
- West side of Gilbert H. Grosvenor Hall
- Interactive map of the Gilbert H. Grosvenor Hall area

General information
- Architectural style: General Design with Romanesque Revival elements
- Location: 532 Chebucto Street, Baddeck, NS, Canada
- Construction started: 1885
- Completed: 1886

Technical details
- Structural system: Sandstone

Design and construction
- Architect: Thomas Fuller

Nova Scotia Heritage Property Act
- Type: Provincially Registered Property
- Designated: 1983

Gilbert H. Grosvenor Hall is a historic building in Baddeck, Nova Scotia, Canada. The 19th-century building has served as a post office, library, and interpretive centre.

== History ==
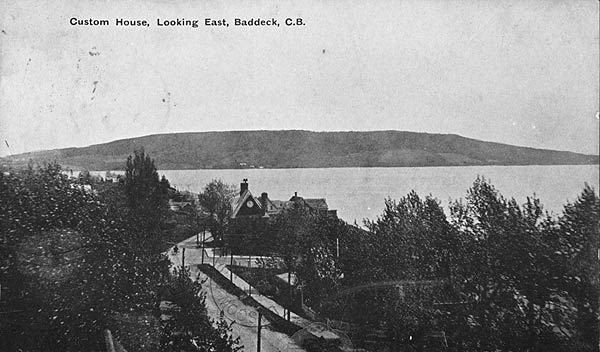
Postcard featuring Gilbert H. Grosvenor Hall in 1907

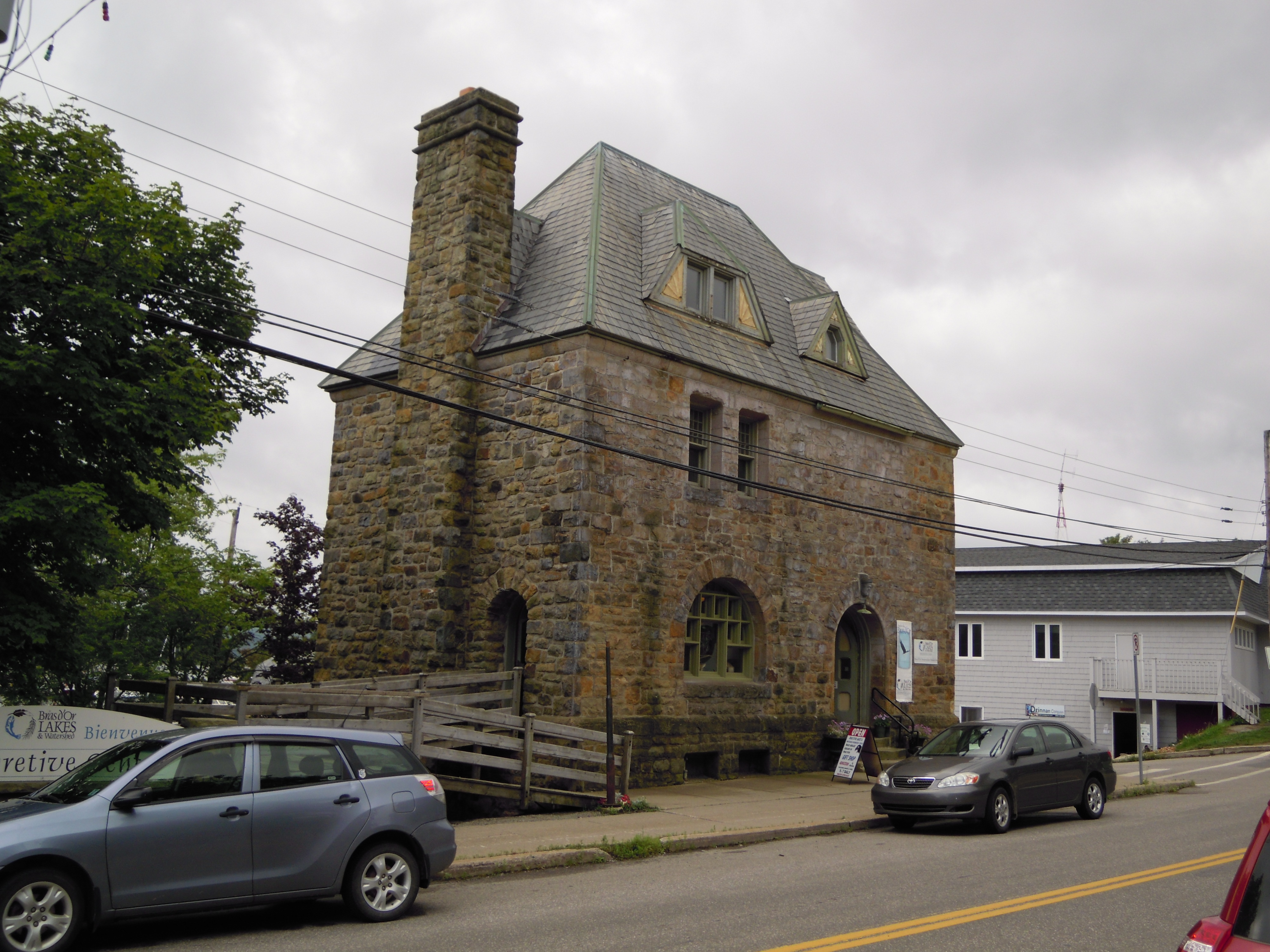
As viewed from Chebucto Street

The building was originally built as the Baddeck Post Office and Custom House, Opening in 1886. The post office was located on the main floor with the custom house on the upper floor. The post office relocated in 1956, and the building was sold to Samuel Gayley who gave it to his wife Gertrude Gayley—the granddaughter of Alexander Graham Bell. Gertrude Gayley named the building after her father, Gilbert Hovey Grosvenor, a former editor of National Geographic Magazine. The building was given to the Baddeck Library Board and housed the Baddeck Library until the 1980s. The property was recognized as an historic property by Nova Scotia's Heritage Property Act in 1983. In 1999 the building became home to the Bras d'Or Lakes and Watershed Interpretive Centre.

== Design ==
The building is three storeys tall and built of red sandstone excavated from Boularderie, Nova Scotia. It was designed by Thomas Fuller, Chief Architect of Canada and co-designer of Ottawa's first Parliament buildings. Its design is typical of 19th-century Canadian post offices, featuring Romanesque Revival elements. The face of former local Member of Parliament Charles J. Campbell is carved into the stone above the entrance. The clock, located on the west gable, was added in 1912.

== See also ==
- Historic Buildings in Baddeck, Nova Scotia
- History of Baddeck
