= St. Mark's Masonic Lodge =

Masonic lodge in Baddeck, Nova Scotia

Coordinates: 46.1012°N 60.7522°W

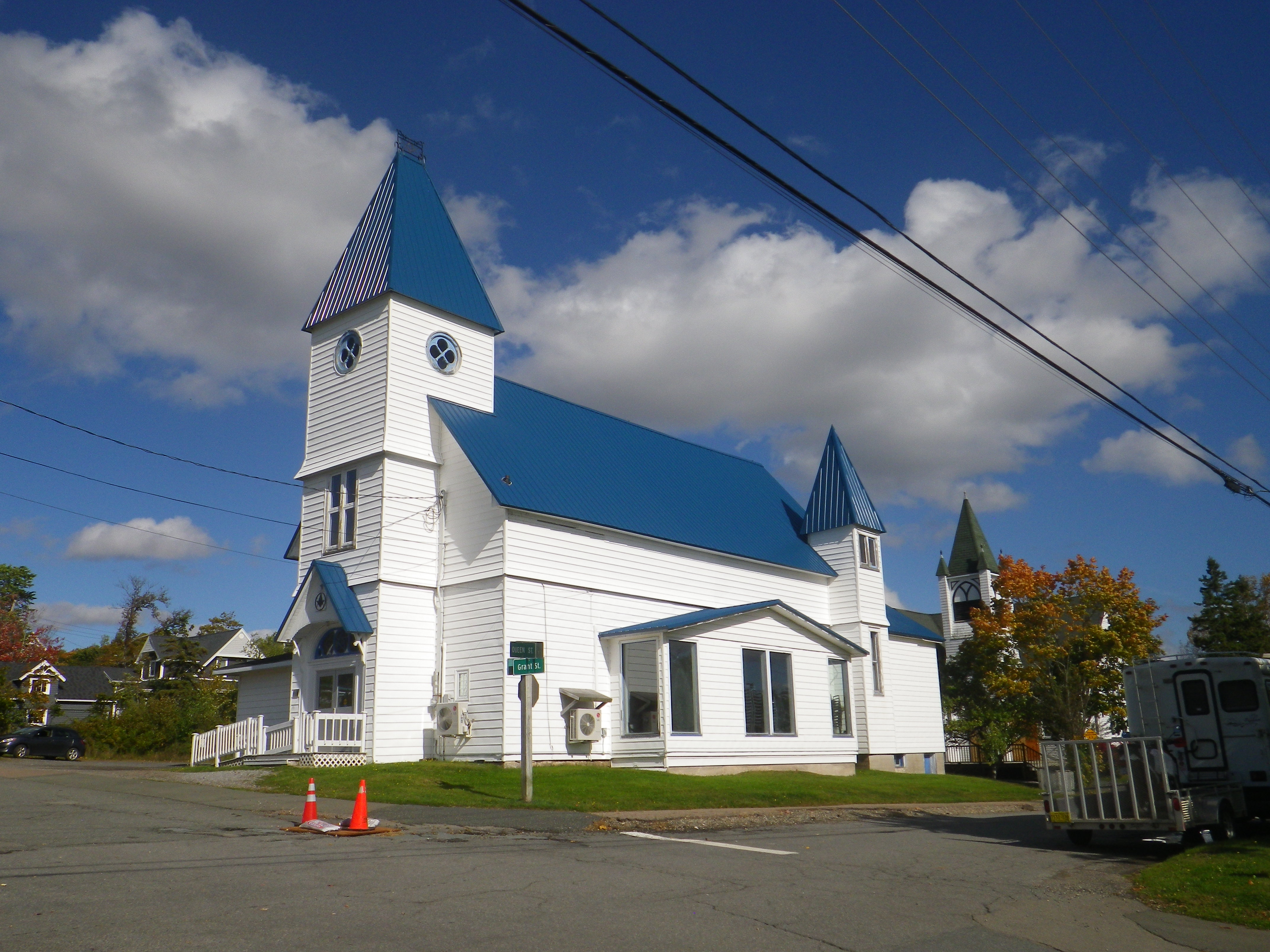
- Interactive map of the St. Mark's Masonic Lodge area

General information
- Architectural style: Neo-Classical, Ecclesiastical Architecture
- Location: 24 Queen St., Baddeck, NS, Canada
- Construction started: 1898
- Completed: 1898

Technical details
- Structural system: Wood frame

St. Mark's Masonic Lodge is a historic Mason's Lodge located at the corner of Queen Street and Grant Street in Baddeck, Nova Scotia. The Lodge was constructed in 1898 to replace a lodge that had been destroyed in a fire.

The lodge was built in the style of a church, with a central square tower on the front gable and a square tower on the rear elevation. The building features elaborate architectural and Masonic details, however many of these have been covered with modern vinyl siding; Masonic symbols are visible on the tower and transom.

The Municipality of the County of Victoria declared the lodge as a municipal heritage property in 2007.

== See also ==
- Historic Buildings in Baddeck, Nova Scotia
- History of Baddeck
