= Alexander MacLeod (writer) =

Canadian writer and academic

- Born: 1972 (age 53–54); Inverness, Nova Scotia, Canada
- Education: University of Windsor (BA); University of Notre Dame (MFA); McGill University (PhD)
- Occupation: Writer of short stories
- Relatives: Alistair MacLeod (father)
- Writing career
- Period: 2010s–present
- Notable work: Light Lifting (2010)

Alexander MacLeod is a Canadian writer and professor of English, Creative Writing and Atlantic Canada Studies at Saint Mary's University in Halifax, Nova Scotia. His debut short story collection Light Lifting was a shortlisted nominee for the 2010 Scotiabank Giller Prize and the 2011 Frank O'Connor International Short Story Award. It won the Margaret and John Savage First Book Award in the 2011 Atlantic Book Awards. In 2019, he won an O. Henry Award for his short story, "Lagomorph", which was first published in Granta.

The son of Canadian novelist and short-story writer Alistair MacLeod and of his wife, Anita MacLellan, he was born in Inverness, Nova Scotia, in 1972 and raised in Windsor, Ontario, where his father taught at the University of Windsor. MacLeod completed an undergraduate degree at the University of Windsor. He earned a first graduate degree at the University of Notre Dame in Indiana in 1997 and later completed a PhD at McGill University in Montreal.

MacLeod served as a judge for the 2015 Scotiabank Giller Prize.

MacLeod is also a former national level track and field runner and competed for the University of Windsor. Subsequent to his competitive running career, MacLeod captained both the 2009 and 2010 Cabot Trail Relay winning teams, the Dennis Fairall Grey Hairs.

His second short story collection Animal Person was published in 2022.

== Awards ==
Year	Work	Award	Category	Result	Ref.
2010	Light Lifting	Scotiabank Giller Prize	—	Shortlisted	
2011	Light Lifting	Andrew Carnegie Medal for Excellence	Fiction	Longlisted	
2011	Light Lifting	Atlantic Book Awards	Margaret and John Savage First Book Award	Won	
2011	Light Lifting	Commonwealth Writers' Prize	First Book (Canada and the Caribbean)	Shortlisted	
2011	Light Lifting	Frank O'Connor International Short Story Award	—	Shortlisted	
2011	Light Lifting	Thomas Head Raddall Award	Fiction	Shortlisted	
2019	"Lagomorph"	O. Henry Award	—	Won	
2021	"Lagomorph"	Nova Scotia Masterworks Arts Award	Collaborative Work	Won	

== Bibliography ==
- Light Lifting (2010)
- Animal Person (2022)
