= Kidston Island Lighthouse =

Lighthouse in Nova Scotia, Canada

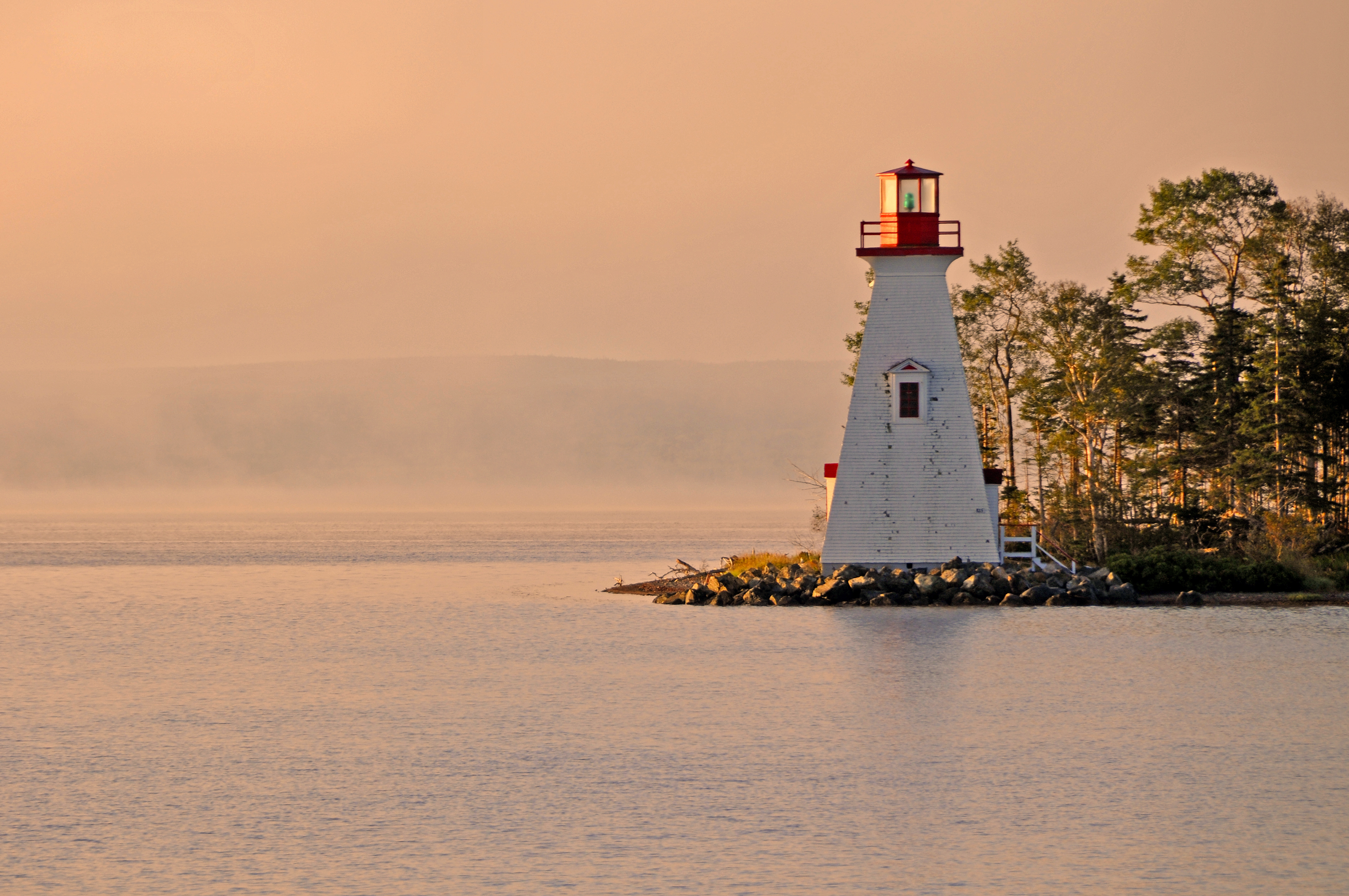
- The lighthouse as seen from the mainland.
- Location: Kidston Island; Baddeck, Nova Scotia
- Coordinates: 46°05′53.3″N 60°44′31.3″W

Tower
- Constructed: 1875 (first); 1912 (second)
- Construction: wooden tower
- Automated: 1960
- Height: 14.5 metres (48 ft)
- Shape: square tower with balcony and lantern
- Markings: white tower, red balcony and lantern
- Operator: Village of Baddeck

Light
- First lit: 1959 (current)
- Focal height: 13.5 metres (44 ft)
- Range: 6 nautical miles (11 km; 6.9 mi)
- Characteristic: Fl G 12s.

The Kidston Island Lighthouse is a lighthouse on Kidston Island, located in the Bras d'Or lakes, in Baddeck, Nova Scotia. The original lighthouse on Kidston Island was built in 1875. The present lighthouse was built in 1912 and the two stood side by side for some time. The lighthouse can only be accessed by boat; a ferry operates during the summer months.

== See also ==
- List of lighthouses in Canada
- Historic Buildings in Baddeck, Nova Scotia
- History of Baddeck
