= Cabot Trail Relay Race =

Relay race in Nova Scotia, Canada

- Cabot Trail Relay Race Logo
- Date: May
- Location: Cabot Trail, starting and ending in Baddeck, Nova Scotia
- Event type: Road Relay
- Distance: 276.33 km (171.70 mi)
- Established: 1988
- Course records: 15:19:34 - Team: Slow Ships - Men (2024)
- Website: http://cabottrailrelay.com

The Cabot Trail Relay Race is an annual 276.33 km (171.70 mi) relay race around Cape Breton's Cabot Trail. The race takes place over 24 hours in 17 stages and features up to 70 teams and 1,200 runners. The race begins and ends in Baddeck, Nova Scotia. The annual event began in 1988, when just 6 teams participated. Since its founding, over 27,000 runners have participated in the event.

== Format ==
The race takes place over approximately 24 hours, beginning on a Saturday morning and continuing to Sunday morning. The race is divided into 17 stages which are unequal both in distance and difficulty. Typically each leg is run by a different runner, but runners can run multiple legs. In 2010 ultramarathoner Mark Campbell attempted to run the entire relay solo, but fell ill and could not complete it. The race begins at the Gaelic College monument outside of Baddeck and completes the Cabot Trail in a counter-clockwise direction, ending in front of the Baddeck Court House. Although some sections of the race are relatively flat, others ascend mountains including Cape Smokey, North Mountain, and MacKenzie Mountain—climbing as high as 460 meters. Leg 9 of the race, which runs over North Mountain, is generally considered the most difficult leg of the race.

== Race Map ==
Full Race Map

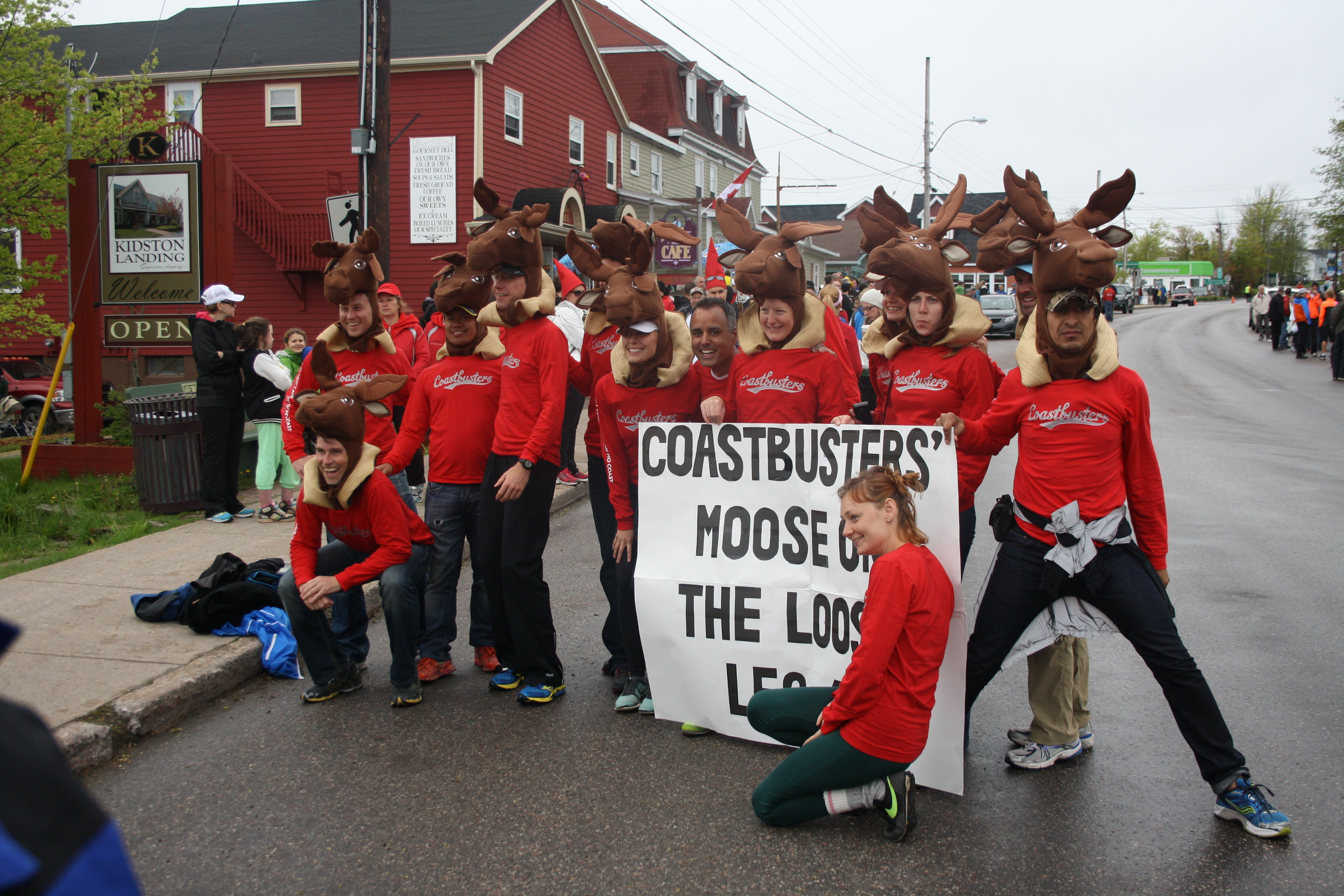
Runners at the Cabot Trail Relay Race, in costume.

== Entry lottery ==
The race is limited to just 70 teams. 45 teams are drawn from a hat of registered entrants. Another 25 teams are selected by members of the tech crew and organizing committee. The remaining teams are placed on a wait list. A list of accepted teams is posted in January of the year of the race.

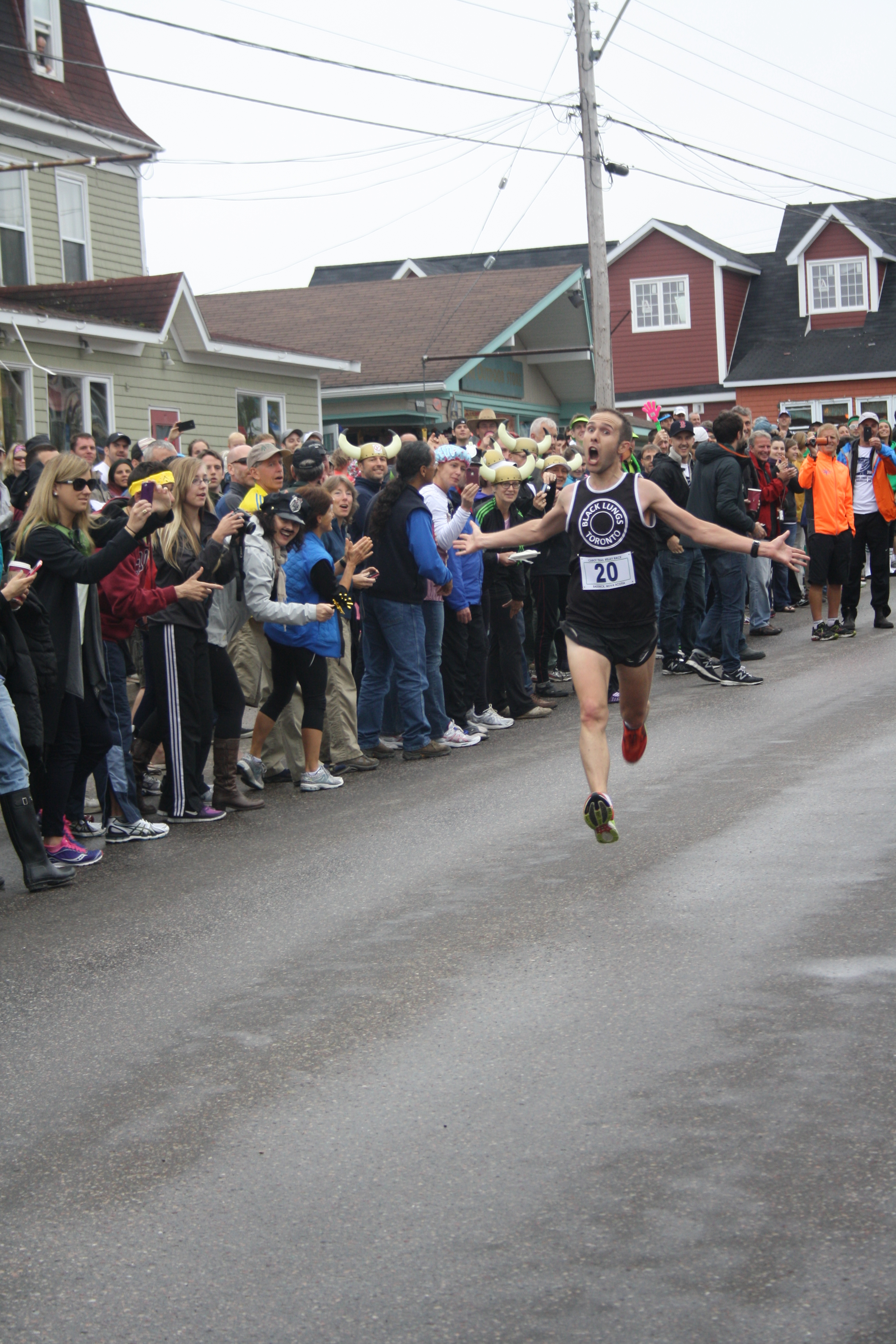
A runner approaches the finish line of the final leg.

== Requirements ==
Runners must be 18 years of age to participate in the race. Additionally, runners should be able to run a minimum pace of 5:36 per km (9:00 per mile). Runners are expected to finish each leg within the time allotted by this pace. Runners who fail to finish a leg within the allotted time are assigned the time of the slowest runner to complete the leg, plus 5 minutes.

== Course records ==
=== Male ===
Team	Time	Distance (Km) (Note: Courses are not certified and distances (and therefore paces) are only estimates.)	Year	Pace (Min/Km)
Slow Ships	15:19:34	276.33	2024	3:21

=== Female ===
Team	Time	Distance (Km)	Year	Pace (Min/Km)
The Boys	18:18:39	276.33	2025	3:59

=== Mixed ===
Team	Time	Distance (Km)	Year	Pace (Min/Km)
Halifax Road Hammers Mixed - Team 1	17:34:54	276.33	2023	3:49

=== Masters ===
Team	Time	Distance (Km)	Year	Pace (Min/Km)
Toronto Harriers Masters Team	18:03:16	276.33	2024	3:56

== Leg records ==
Leg distances are not formally certified. The Cabot Trail Relay is run on public roads that are subject to periodic maintenance, closure, and detours. Leg start and finish locations are occasionally altered for logistical purposes, and these changes may not be reflected in the officially published leg records.

=== Male ===
The top male record holder is Dan Vassallo who holds three leg records.

Leg	Difficulty	Runner	Time	Distance (Km)	Year	Pace (Min/Km)
1	3.5	Luke Marsanskis	53:17	17.00	2024	3:09
2	3.5	Dan Vassallo	56:37	17.92	2022	3:10
3	2	Lee Wesselius	41:31	13.46	2024	3:05
4	5	Dan Vassallo	1:06:36	20.01	2014	3:20
5	3.5	Ryan Jara	55:24	17.50	2024	3:10
6	4.5	Alec Troxell	57:02	17.50	2024	3:16
7	3	Jesse Orach	44:02	13.10	2018	3:22
8	2.5	Judson Cake	40:00	12.36	2012	3:17
9	5	Alec Troxell	1:00:47	17.84	2023	3:24
10	5	Joel Gallant	52:27	14.70	2024	3:35
11	3.5	Erik McCarthy	43:48	14.00	2017	3:08
12	3	Maksym Pokotylets	50:03	15.78	2024	3:11
13	3	Aaron Manning	52:49	15.88	2024	3:20
14	4	Dan Vassallo	1:02:17	19.81	2018	3:09
15	2	Erik McCarthy	50:05	15.42	2018	3:15
16	2	Aaron Willingham	48:05	15.35	2023	3:08
17	4.5	Jacob Benoit	1:00:02	18.7 (Note: A longer 19.3 Km course was used in 2012 and 2013 due to a bridge closure. Adam Goode holds the male record on the alternate course, completing it in a time of 1:06:51 in 2012.)	2024	3:13
Total				276.27		

=== Female ===
Sheri Piers is the top female record holder, holding four leg records.

Leg	Difficulty	Runner	Time	Distance (Km)	Year	Pace (Min/Km)
1	3.5	Meaghan Strum	1:03:06	17	2024	3:43
2	3.5	Colleen Wilson	1:05:21	17.92	2022	3:42
3	2	Sheri Piers	47:47	13.46	2012	3:33
4	5	Sheri Piers	1:17:43	20.01	2008	3:53
5	3.5	Sheri Piers	1:04:29	17.5	2013	3:42
6	4.5	Sheri Piers	1:03:59	17.5	2009	3:39
7	3	Kristin Barry	51:09	13.5	2014	3:48
8	2.5	Dana Ferguson	48:19	12.36	2014	3:54
9	5	Colleen Wilson	1:11:37	17.84	2024	4:01
10	5	Caroline Schlosser	1:03:54	14.7	2010	4:21
11	3.5	Grace Richard	53:53	14.0	2024	3:51
12	3	Erin MacLean	57:41	15.78	2016	3:39
13	3	Allie Sandluck	1:01:19	15.88	2023	3:52
14	4	Denise Robson	1:16:59	19.81	2007	3:53
15	2	Kristin Barry	58:46	15.42	2010	3:49
16	2	Kristin Barry	55:25	15.35	2008	3:37
17	4.5	Meaghan Strum	1:09:03	18.7 (Note: A longer 19.3 Km course was used in 2012 and 2013 due to a bridge closure. Sheri Piers holds the female record on the alternate course, completing it in a time of 1:17:43 in 2013. Her 4:03 minute/Km pace is the fastest pace run by a female on leg 17.)	2024	3:43

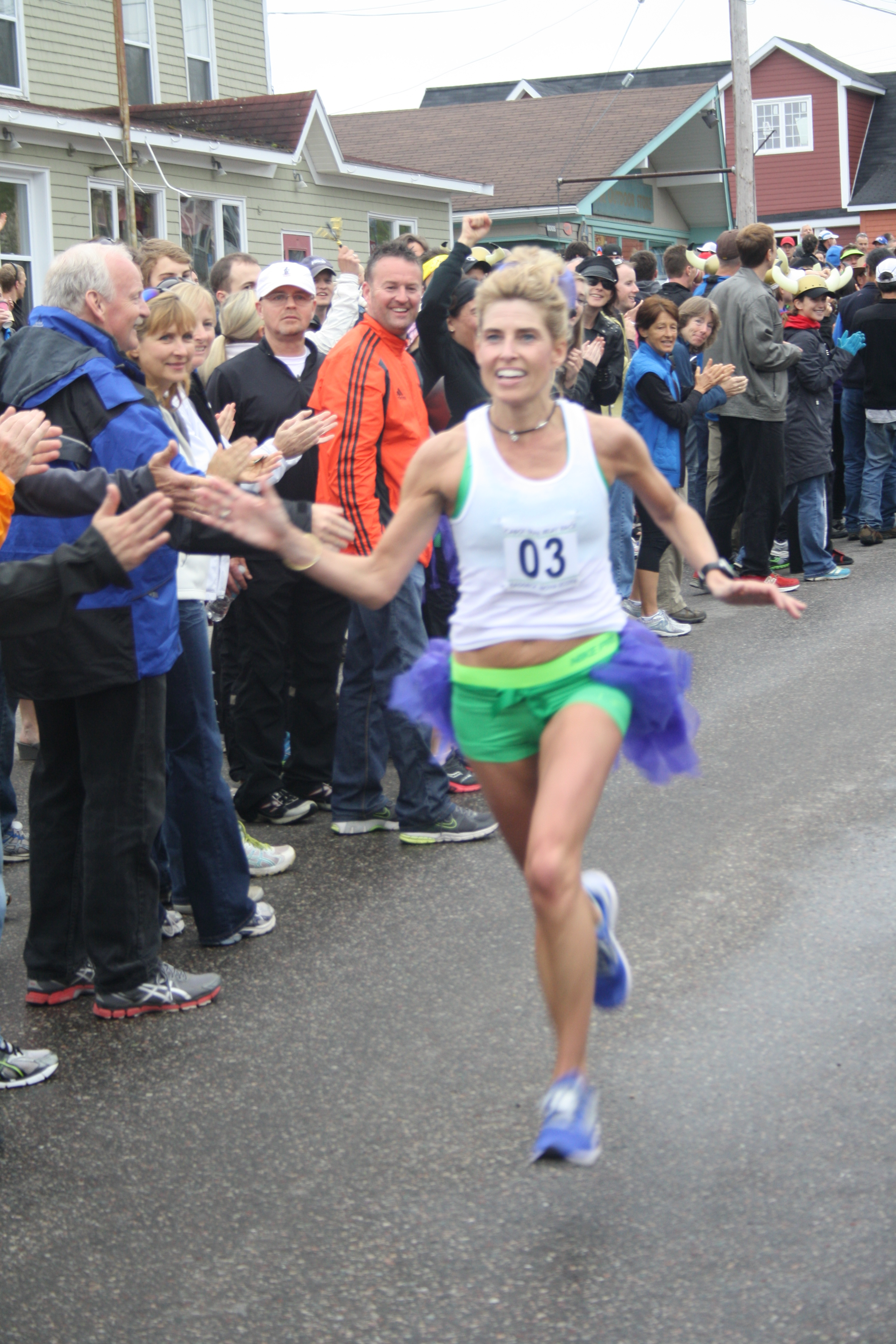
Sheri Piers of the Maine Road Hags approaches the finish line on the final leg of the Cabot Trail Relay Race.
