= Baddeck Academy =

Coordinates: 46.095339°N 60.758278°W

Location
- 320 Shore Road (Nova Scotia Route 205); Baddeck, Nova Scotia; Canada

Information
- Type: Primary-12
- Principal: Gerald McNeil
- Grades: Primary-12

Baddeck Academy is a Primary through Grade 12 school located in Baddeck, Nova Scotia, Canada, on Cape Breton Island in Victoria County. It is governed by the Cape Breton – Victoria Regional School Board. The academy overlooks Bras d'Or Lake.

The 2008–09 enrollment of the school was 326 students, with 138 at the elementary level, 95 at the junior level and 93 at the senior high level.
