= Victoria County Court House =

Historic building in Nova Scotia, Canada

Coordinates: 46.1005°N 60.7512°W

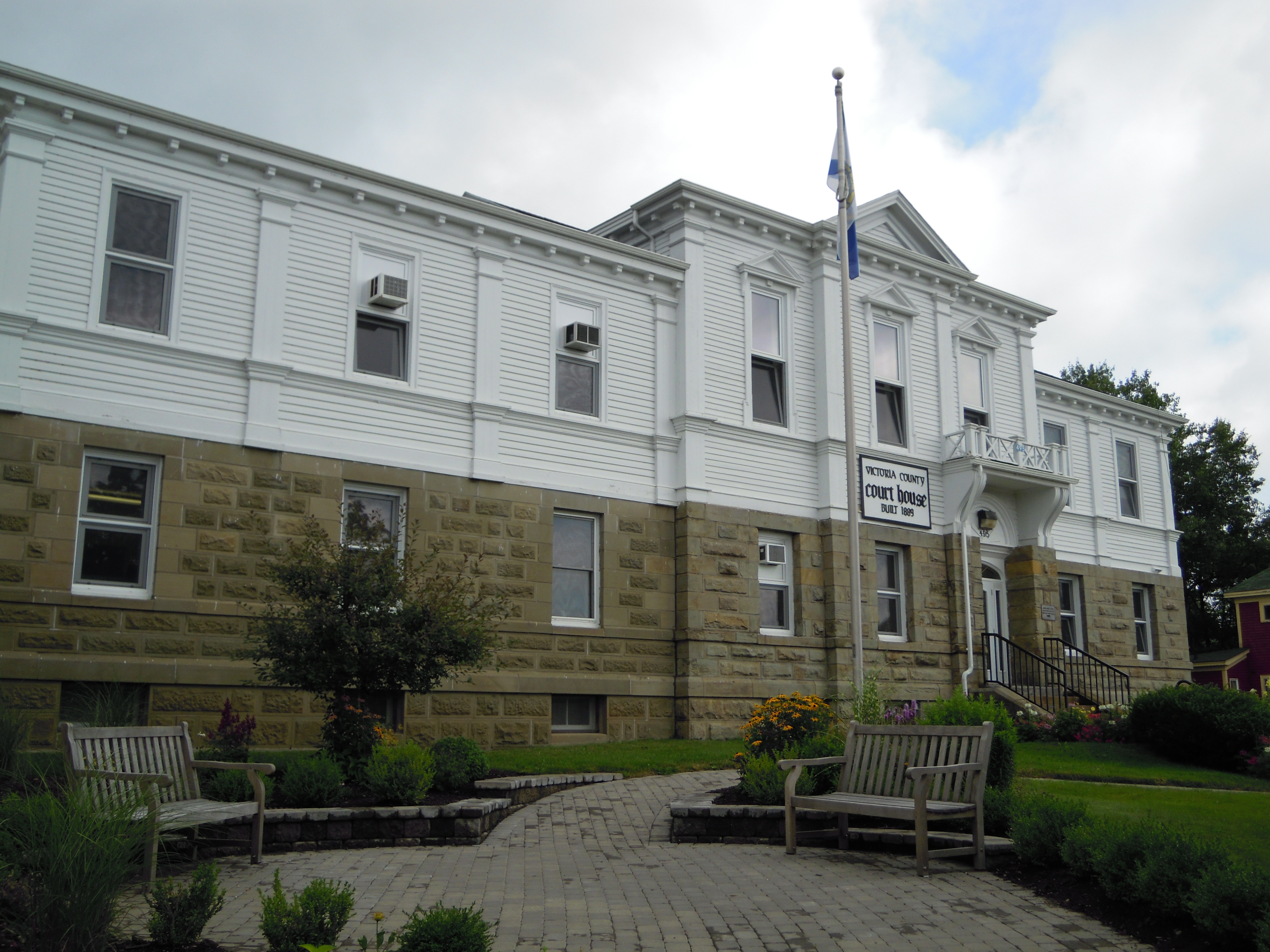
- The Victoria County Court House in 2010
- Interactive map of the Victoria County Court House area

General information
- Architectural style: Classical Revival
- Location: 495 Chebucto Street, Baddeck, NS, Canada
- Construction started: 1889
- Completed: 1889
- Client: Victoria County

Technical details
- Structural system: Granite, Clapboard

The Victoria County Court House is a historic building in Baddeck, Nova Scotia.

== History ==
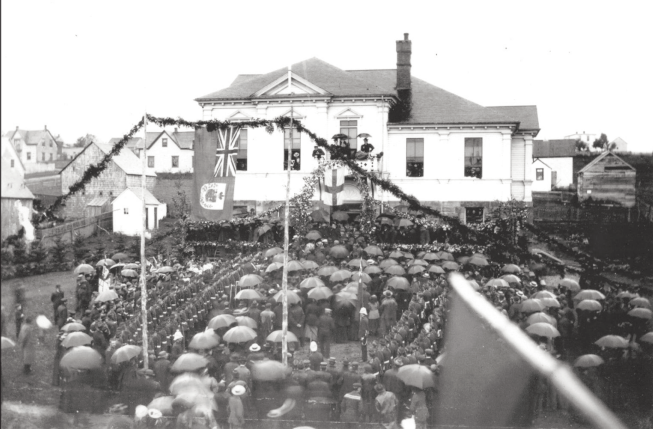
The Court House during a visit by Governor General John Campbell Hamilton-Gordon, 1st Marquess of Aberdeen in 1897

In 1851, Victoria County was split off from Cape Breton County, leaving the new county without a court house of its own. The court house was constructed in 1889 by Phillip MacRae, a carpenter from Big Baddeck. The building was recognized as a historic property in 1989, under the Nova Scotia Heritage Property Act.

== Design ==
The court house is a two-story building constructed in the Classical Revival style with a hipped roof and built of granite and wooden clapboard. The building was originally asymmetrical in design, with a centre block and east wing; a western wing was added in 1967.

== See also ==
- Historic Buildings in Baddeck, Nova Scotia
- History of Baddeck
