= Kidston Island =

Island in Nova Scotia, Canada

Formerly known as: Mutton Island and later Duke of Kent's Island
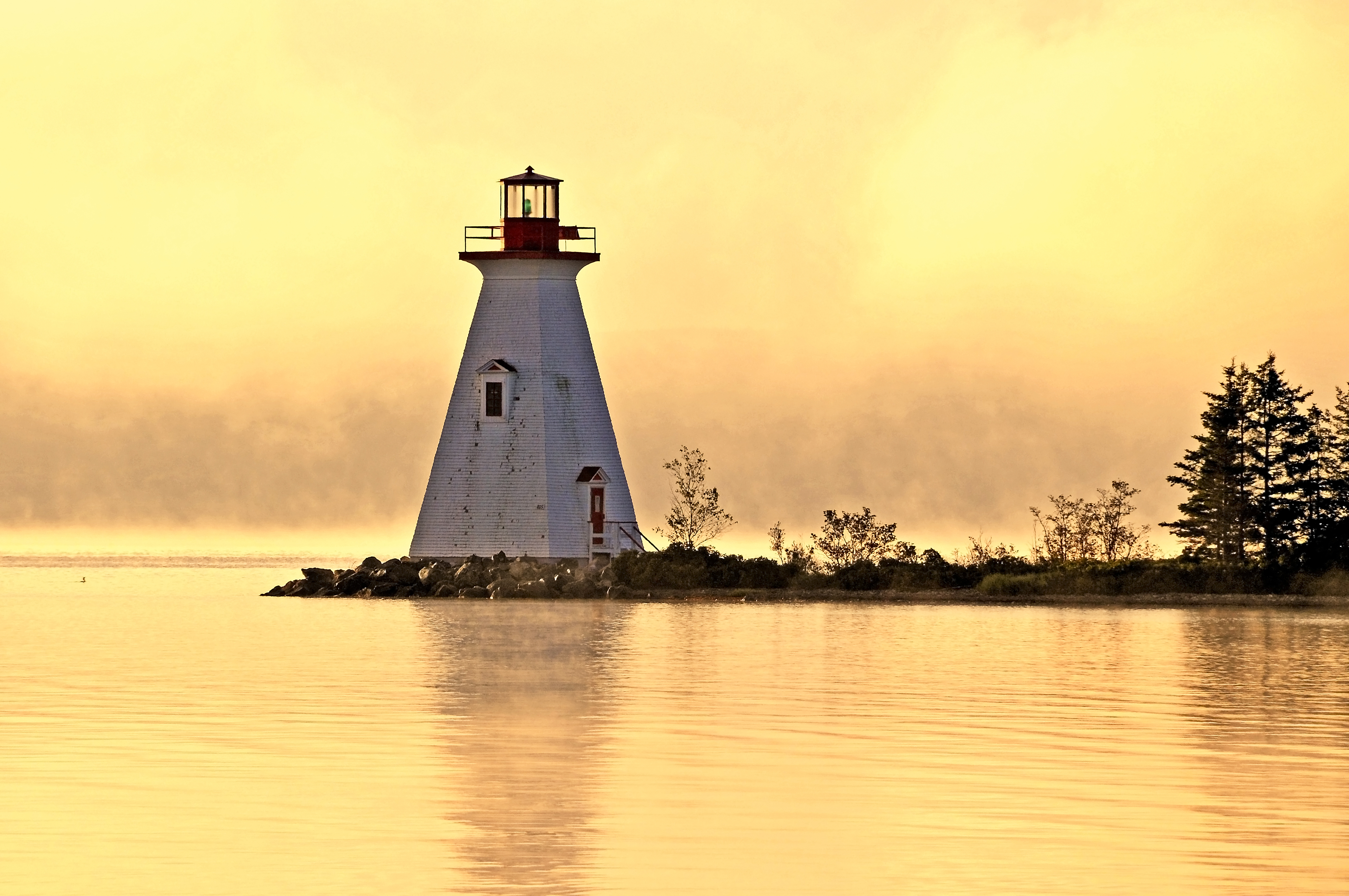
- Lighthouse at Kidston Island
- Interactive map of Kidston Island

Geography
- Location: Bras d'Or Lakes
- Coordinates: 46.09466°N 60.74618°W

Administration
- Canada
- Province: Nova Scotia
- Municipality: Baddeck

Demographics
- Population: 0

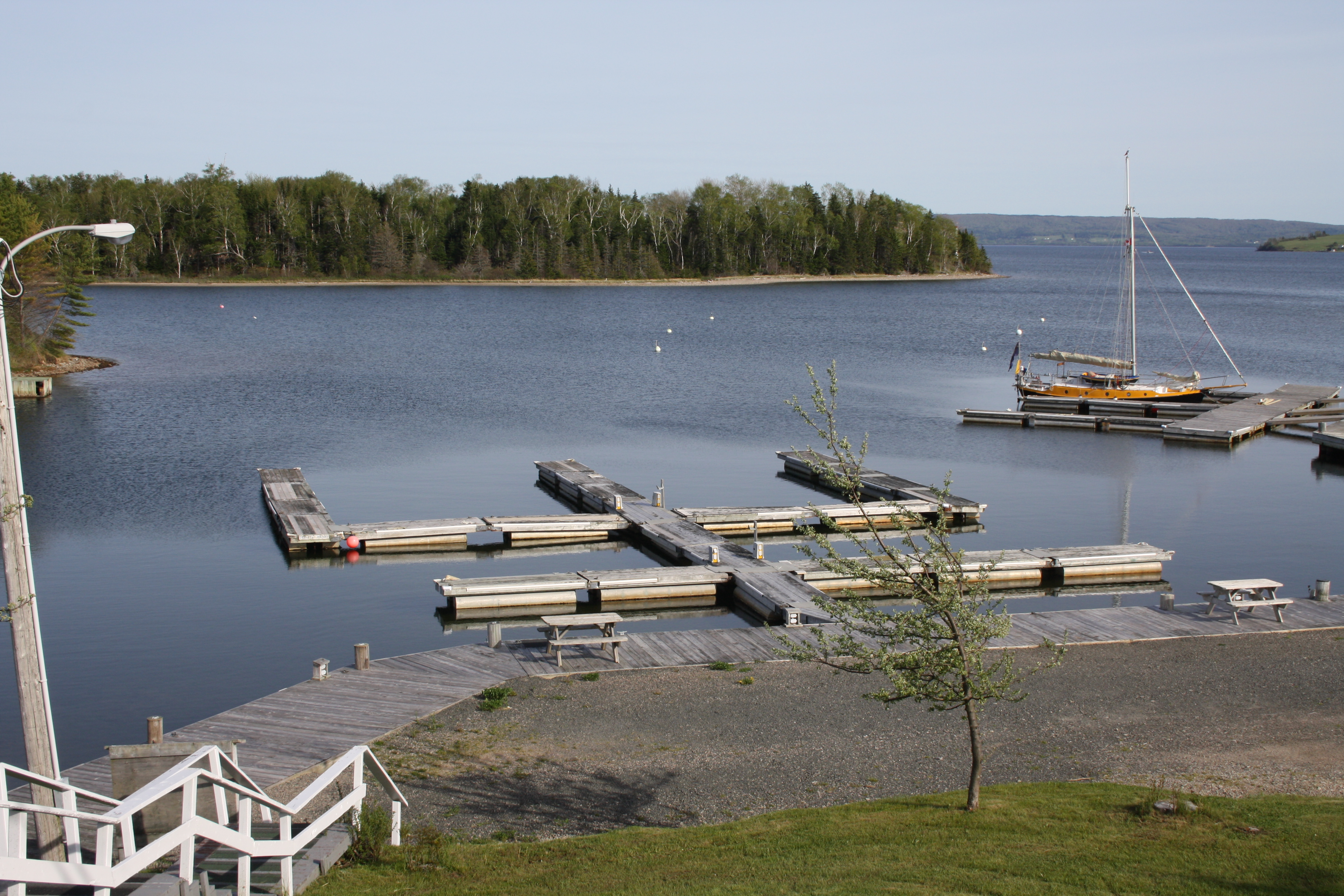
The western tip of the island, viewed from Royal Canadian Legion Branch 53

Kidston Island, a 35-acre sliver of real estate providing protection for Baddeck harbour which lies within has had quite a storied past. It became the first white settlement in what eventually would become Baddeck when a retired British naval officer from Halifax by the name of James Duffus took up occupancy there in 1819. It and the area around it consisted entirely of virgin woodland. The only inhabitants in the vicinity were the native people who called the area "Ebedeck", loosely translated to mean "place with an island nearby".

By the time Duffus arrived on the scene the island was known as ‘Leg-a-Mutton’ (for its shape) by the British who had controlled Cape Breton Island since the defeat of the French at Louisbourg. In common parlance the name had been shortened to ‘Mutton Island’. The story of James Duffus is of itself quite a romantic tale with just a simple overview provided within the scope of this paper.

Duffus immediately went about establishing a home and store on the island and changed the name to ‘Duke of Kent Island’. Prince Edward, the Duke of Kent and future father of Queen Victoria, Duffus's Patron was Commander-in Chief of His Majesty's forces in North America in Halifax where Duffus had been stationed. By 1822 Duffus had married and begun a family on the island which soon after took on the name ‘Duffus Island’. In 1824 Duffus secured a grant of 400 acres on the mainland opposite the island which in time became what we now know as the village of Baddeck. In September 1833, James Duffus died while taking passage to Halifax where he was to receive medical attention. He was 46 years of age and left a widow and two sons, now alone on Duffus Island.

For the next two years the Mrs. Duffus managed to maintain the store on the island. Then in 1835 a gentleman from Halifax by the name of William R. Kidston arrived in order to administer the Duffus estate. He did more than that. Within a year he had married the widow Duffus and moved onto the island where they continued to run the business. Some years later they relocated to the mainland side on the opposite shore to where the author now resides on Water Street. By this time the island had taken on yet another name, the same one that prevails today.

Since then the island has seen a succession of different owners. According to recitals contained within the most recent title document, the Kidston family retained ownership until sometime in the 1880s. Just a few years before, in 1875 William Kidston (a grandson of the aforesaid William R. Kidston) conveyed a small fifty-foot square lot to HMQ – Minister of Marine & Fisheries to allow for the erection of a lighthouse, built that same year on the north end of the island. Ownership of the island eventually fell to one Alexander Ross who then sold to Frank J.D. Barnjum. In the early part of the 20th century there was talk of building a resort which would have forever altered the character of the island. Fortunately, it did not happen.

By 1936 Kidston Island was owned by a Leonora B. Wood who that year conveyed it to Mersey Paper Company Limited. It held title until 1960 (during which time it presumably cut and harvested merchantable timber from the site) when it conveyed the island to The Village Commissioners of Baddeck.

== Features ==
The island features a lifeguarded beach operated by the Lions Club. The beach features a picnic area, changing rooms and washrooms. The island is also home to the Kidston Island Lighthouse, an historic property located on the eastern tip of the island.

Kidston island is accessible during July and August via a 12-passenger ferry operated by the Lions Club.

== History ==
In 1819, Lt. James Duffus (half pay Naval Officer), whose brother-in-law was Sir Samuel Cunard founder of the Cunard Line of steamships, founded his home on what is now Kidston Island. Duffus operated a mercantile business on the island, serving people from River Baddeck and Grand Narrows; customers were ferried to the island by canoe. Duffus died in 1833, and his former assistants operated the business for a little over two years. In 1836 the executors of his estate in Halifax sent William Kidston to wind up his business. Kidston met and ended up marrying Margaret Ann Duffus, widow of James Duffus, in 1836 and taking over the business. The Kidston business was moved to the mainland in 1840. A lighthouse was built on Kidston Island in 1875. The present lighthouse was built in 1912 and the two stood side-by-side for some time. Eventually the island came to be owned by the Mersey Paper Company which sold it to the Village of Baddeck in 1959.
