= HMCS Baddeck =

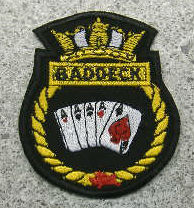
Badge of HMCS Baddeck

HMCS Baddeck is a name used by the Royal Canadian Navy for several vessels. The name derives from Baddeck, Nova Scotia.

- HMCS Baddeck (K147), a Flower-class corvette
- HMCS Baddeck (R-103), an experimental hydrofoil

== Battle honours ==
- Atlantic, 1941–45
- Normandy, 1944
- English Channel, 1944–45
