= History of Baddeck =

History of Canadian village in Nova Scotia

Baddeck is a village founded in 1908, with a history stretching back to early Mi'kmaq, French, and British settlements. The village was home to Alexander Graham Bell and was witness to the first flight in the commonwealth with Bell's Silver Dart.

== Early Settlement ==
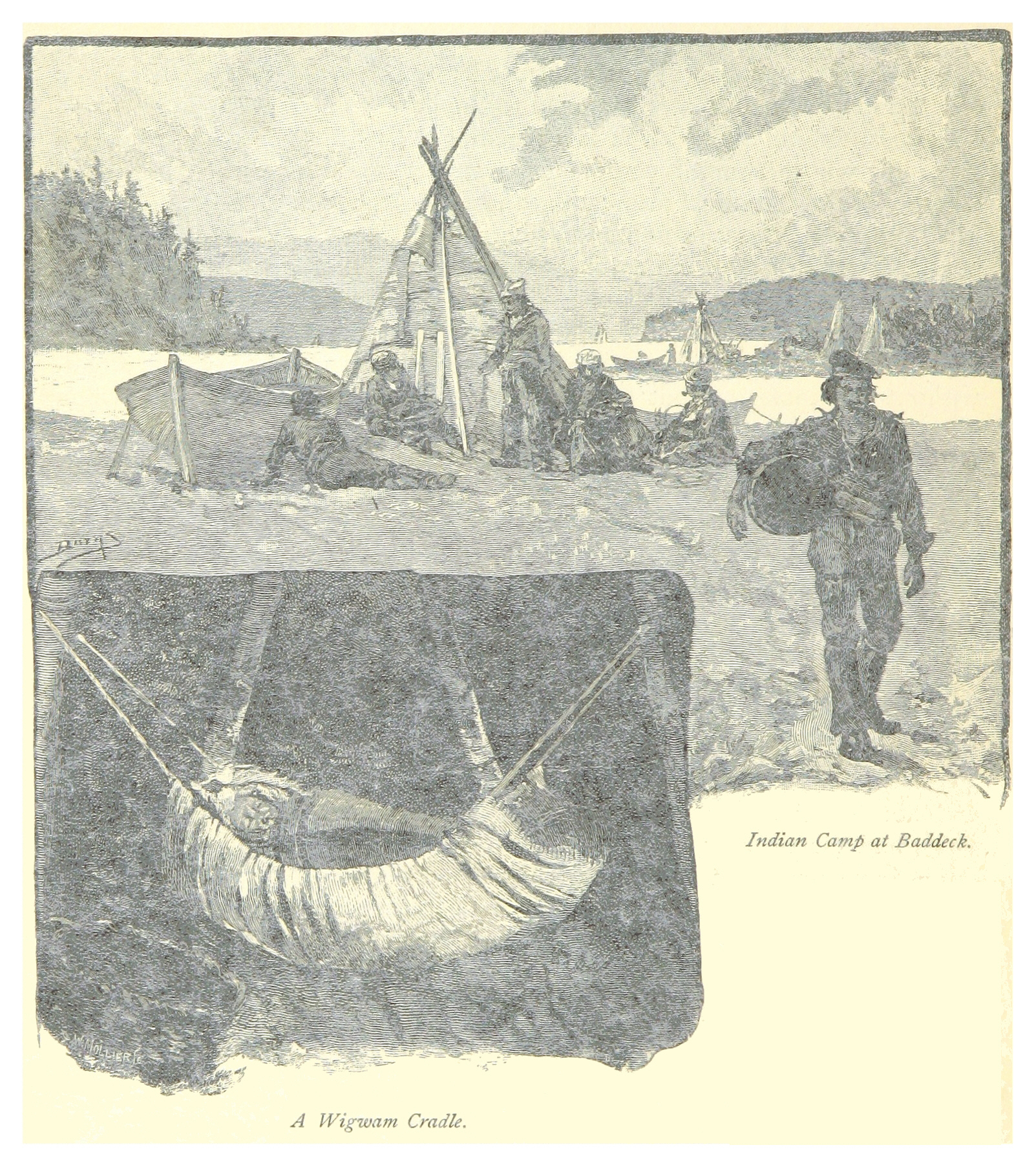
Indian Camp at Baddeck, 1885

The name "Baddeck" is believed to originate from a Mi'kmaq word. One theory is that it originates from the word "Abadek" or "Abadak," which means "a portion of food set aside for someone or a sultry place," while another theory is that it originates from a word meaning "place with an island near."

Europeans discovered the inland part of Cape Breton Island during the 17th century when Jesuit missionaries from France established a settlement at nearby St. Anns in 1629. British settlement came during the 18th century after the territory was ceded by France.

== Island Settlement ==
In 1819, Lt. James Duffus (half pay Naval Officer), whose brother-in-law was Sir Samuel Cunard founder of the Cunard Line of steamships, founded his home on what is now known as Kidston Island—then known as Mutton Island—off the shore of present-day Baddeck. Duffus renamed the island Duke of Kent's Island, in honor of his patron. Duffus operated a mercantile business on the island, serving people from River Baddeck and Grand Narrows; customers were ferried to the island by canoe. In 1820 Duffus was appointed a magistrate and in 1826 he was granted 400 acres on the mainland. Duffus died in 1833, and his former assistants operated the business for a little over two years. In 1836 the executors of his estate in Halifax sent William Kidston to wind up his business.

== Growth of the Village ==
=== Shire Town ===
Up until 1851 Baddeck was known as Little Baddeck and it was part of Cape Breton County. William Kidston advocated the separation of Cape Breton County. In 1851 Kidston's advocacy paid off and Victoria County was split off from Cape Breton county and Baddeck became known by its present name. Kidston also advocated for Baddeck to become the site for the new county's jail and courthouse, which happened when Baddeck was established as the shire town of the county. When Baddeck became the shire town of the county, it established a municipal council and Murdoch MacAskill became the village custos rotulorum. The Victoria County Court House was finally constructed in 1889.

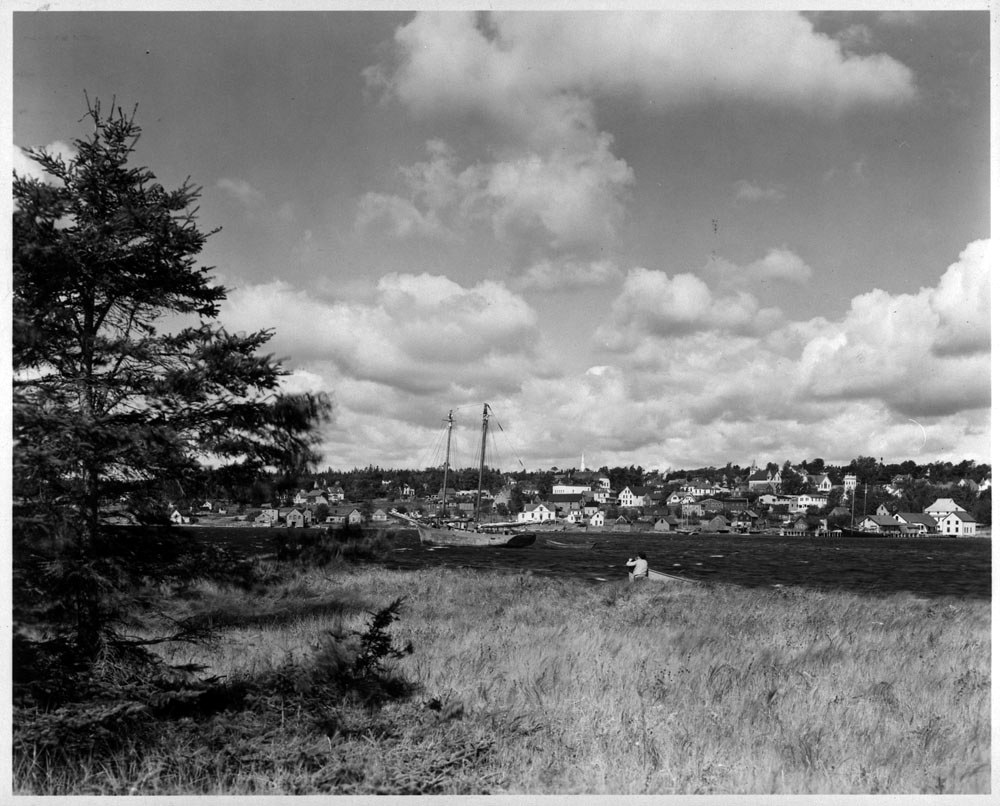
A view of the village of Baddeck, looking across Baddeck harbor from Lighthouse Point on Kidston Island.

=== Baddeck, And that Sort of Thing ===
Baddeck rose to fame in 1874, with the publication of Baddeck, And That Sort of Thing by American writer and associate of Mark Twain, Charles Dudley Warner. Warner had visited Baddeck the previous year with Joseph Twichell and documented the voyage in the book. Warner stayed at the Telegraph House during his visit, a hotel built in 1861 and that still operates today. Warner described Baddeck as a "clean-looking village of white wooden houses, of perhaps seven or eight hundred inhabitants". Warner attended a church service at the kirk near the water. This church would have been Knox Church, a Presbyterian church built on Bay Road in 1857. He describes the church as being similar in appearance to a New England meeting house, with a pretty wooden spire and a plain, ugly interior.

Warner also visited the county jail in Baddeck, which at the time was housing a single prisoner—a carpenter who was permitted to have a workbench and newspapers. The jail had four rooms on the ground floor and an attic with a "sleeping-room". The jailer's family was, at the time, staying in one of the empty cells. In addition to the church and jail, Warner describes Baddeck as having "very good schools" on par with those in Boston.

Other travel books followed Warner's publication. In 1885 Samuel Greene Wheeler Benjamin published The Cruise of the Alice May in the Gulf of St. Lawrence and Adjacent Waters which included a description of Baddeck. According to Benjamin, Baddeck at this time consisted of highlanders—many of whom spoke only Gaelic.

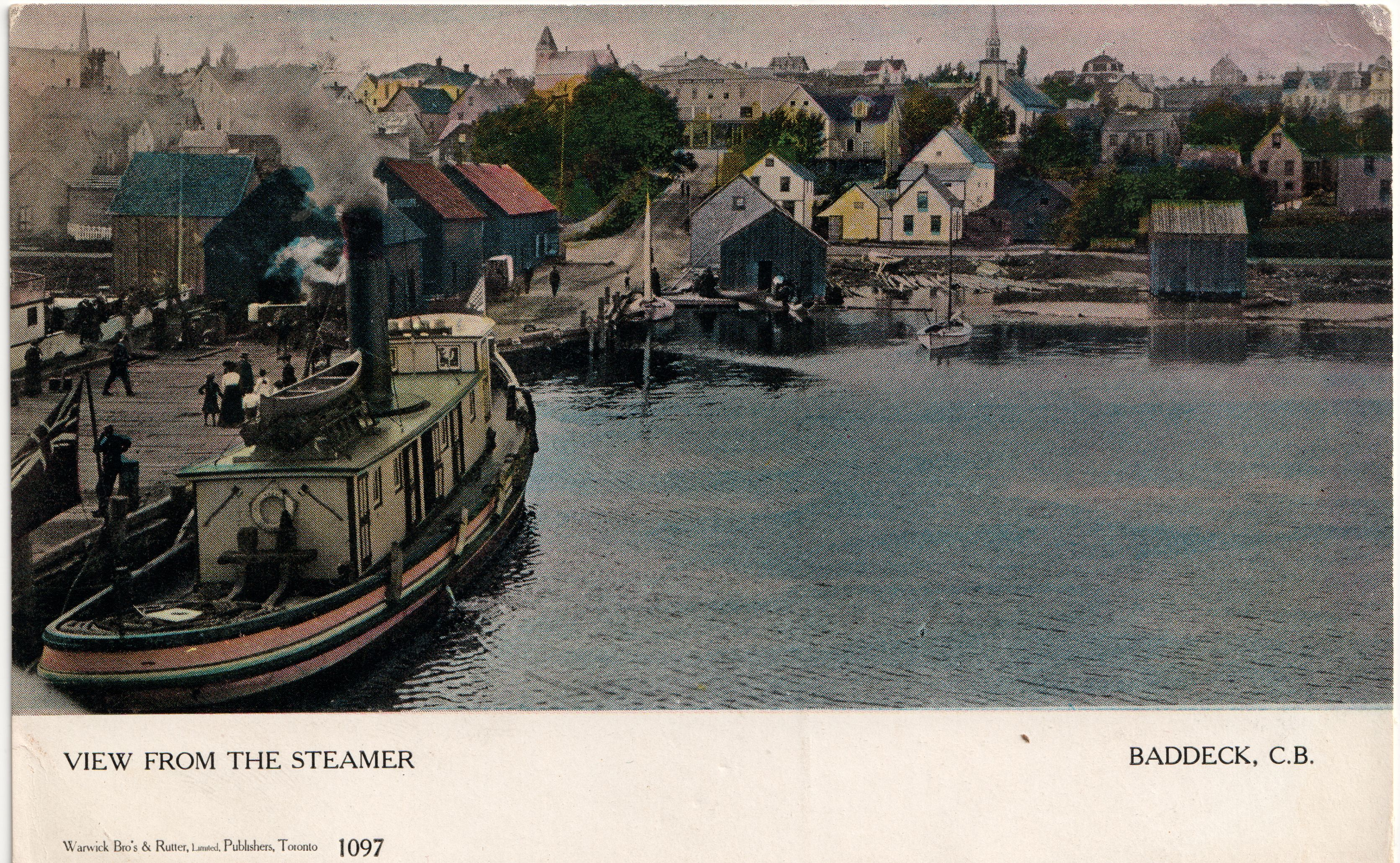
View from the steamer, Baddeck, Cape Breton Island, Nova Scotia in the early 20th century

== Alexander Graham Bell Era ==
In 1885, Alexander Graham Bell, his wife Mabel, and their two young daughters, arrived by boat via the St. Peters Canal. They fell in love with Baddeck and built two homes on their estate, which they named "Beinn Bhreagh" (Gaelic for 'Beautiful Mountain'), as well as another Bell Laboratory, an additional namesake to AT&T's Bell Laboratories many years later. Dr. Bell and his family helped the people of the village begin a new era. Alec Bell, who was a Scot and could speak Gaelic, took Baddeck to heart and made their home a gathering place for the village. Alec and his wife Mabel promoted culture, sociability, science, and industry among the villagers.

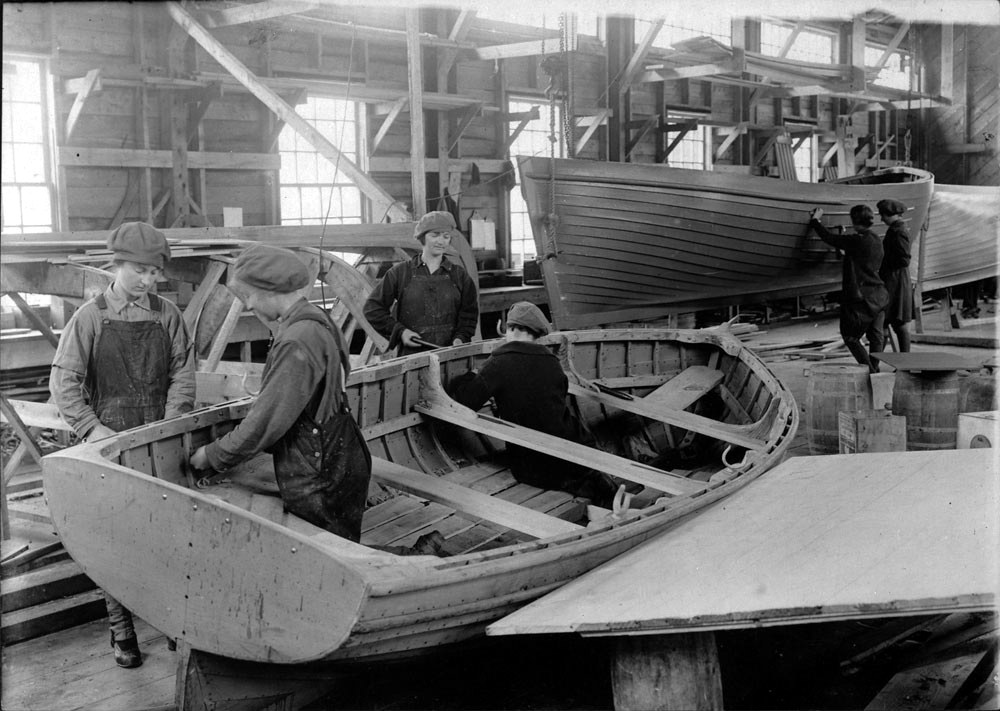
Women workers building lifeboats at Dr. Alexander Graham Bell's laboratory at Beinn Bhreagh.

In his new laboratory on Beinn Bhreagh across the bay from Baddeck, Alec Bell conducted experiments, built mammoth kites, airplanes, hydrofoil boats, and, during World War I, lifeboats for the Royal Canadian Navy. The Bells provided steady employment for many in the village; while Mabel Bell did much to foster home industries, among them the hooking of rugs for which the village of Chéticamp is in the present day famous.

=== Aviation ===
Bell undertook experiments with tetrahedral kites at his lab in Baddeck. On 6 December 1907, Thomas Etholen Selfridge piloted Bell's AEA Cygnet as it was towed into the air behind a motorboat, eventually reaching a height of 168 feet (51 m) in what was the first recorded heavier-than-air flight in Canada. These experiments latter allowed Baddeck to become the site of the first controlled powered aircraft to fly in Canada and the British Empire. Bell's aircraft, named the Silver Dart, was first flown from the ice of Baddeck Bay on 23 February 1909 by Bell's associate, J.A.D. McCurdy.

In the months after the flight of the Silver Dart, Bell's associates Casey Baldwin and McCurdy established the Canadian Aerodrome Company in Baddeck with Bell's financial backing. It was the first commercial aircraft manufacturer in the British Empire and it produced the first Canadian designed and built aircraft in 1909, the Baddeck No. 1, and a copy named the Baddeck No. 2. They also produced the Hubbard Monoplane in 1910, the first Canadian plane built for export. McCurdy and Baldwin also built Bell's experimental Bell Oionus I, though it never took flight. The Canadian Aerodrome Company ceased operations in 1910.

=== Hydrofoils ===
Another one of Bell's experimental craft, the hydrofoil HD-4 (once piloted by Mabel Bell) established the world watercraft speed record in 1917 after traveling at 71 mph (114 km/h) across Baddeck Bay (part of Bras d'Or Lake) – a speed record that endured for 20 years. In 1968 the Canadian Forces named a new experimental hydrofoil patrol ship HMCS Bras d'Or in honor of those early experiments. (see Frederick Walker Baldwin.)
