= Charles Dudley Warner =

American writer (1829–1900)

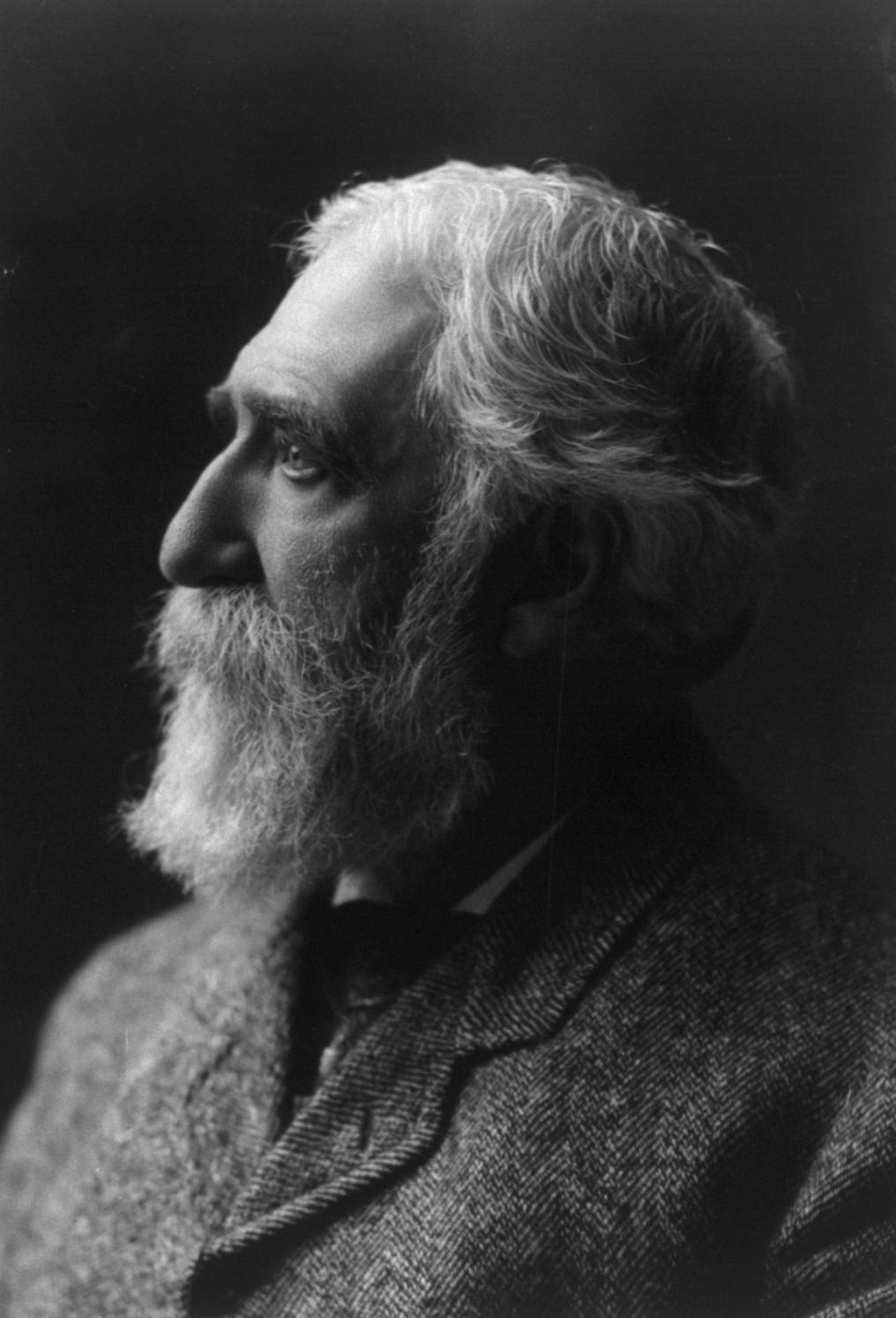
- Warner in 1897
- Born: September 12, 1829; Plainfield, Massachusetts, U.S.
- Died: October 20, 1900 (aged 71); Hartford, Connecticut, U.S.
- Occupations: Writer, editor
- Writing career
- Notable works: The Gilded Age: A Tale of Today, Library of the World's Best Literature.

Signature
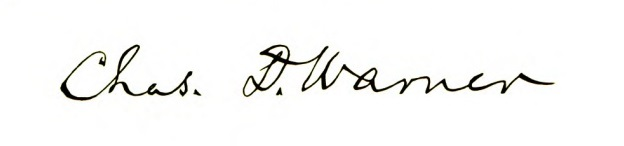

Charles Dudley Warner (September 12, 1829 – October 20, 1900) was an American essayist, novelist, and friend of Mark Twain, with whom he co-authored the novel The Gilded Age: A Tale of Today.

== Biography ==
Warner was born of Puritan descent in Plainfield, Massachusetts. From the ages of six to fourteen he lived in Charlemont, Massachusetts, the place and time revisited in his book Being a Boy (1877). He then moved to Cazenovia, New York, and in 1851 graduated from Hamilton College in Clinton, New York.

He worked with a surveying party in Missouri and then studied law at the University of Pennsylvania. He moved to Chicago, where he practiced law from 1856 to 1860, when he relocated to Connecticut to become assistant editor of The Hartford Press. By 1861 he had become editor, a position he held until 1867, when the paper merged into The Hartford Courant and he became co-editor with Joseph R. Hawley. In an 1861 editorial at the Press Warner was the first to propose creating the holiday Flag Day.

In 1884, he joined the editorial staff of Harper's Magazine, for which he conducted The Editor's Drawer until 1892, when he took charge of The Editor's Study.

Warner traveled widely, lectured frequently, and was actively interested in prison reform, city park supervision, and other movements for the public good. He was the first president of the National Institute of Arts and Letters, and, at the time of his death, was president of the American Social Science Association.

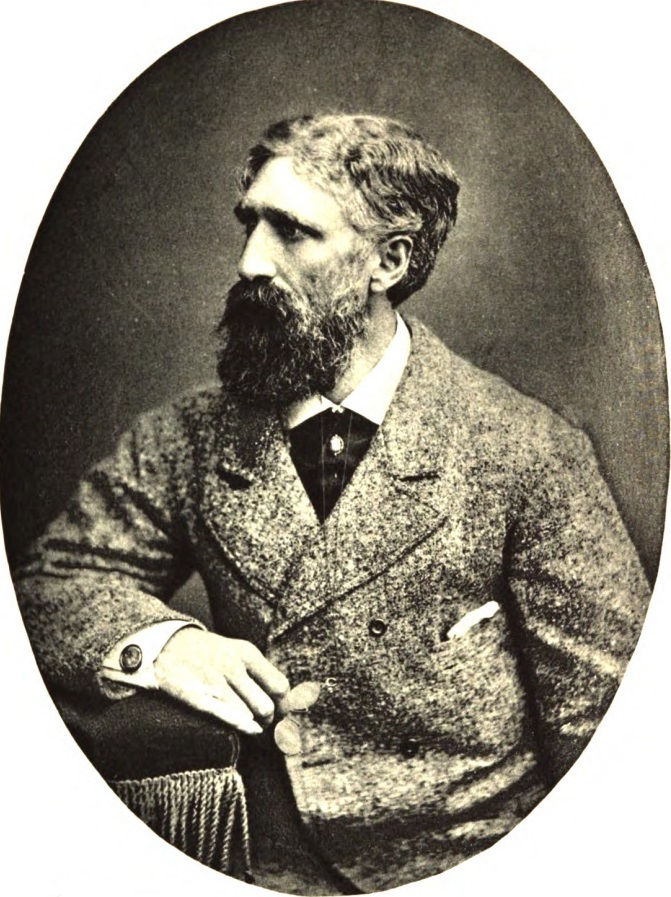
Warner in 1875.

He first attracted attention with the reflective sketches in My Summer in a Garden (1870). First published as a series in The Hartford Courant, these sketches were popular for their abounding and refined humor and mellow personal charm, their love of the outdoors, their suggestive comment on life and affairs, and their delicately finished style, qualities that suggested the work of Washington Irving. In 1873, the work Warner is known for today, the novel he wrote with Mark Twain, was published. Called The Gilded Age: A Tale of Today, it gave that era of American history its name.

Charles Dudley Warner is known for making these famous remarks,

Politics makes strange bedfellows.

Everybody complains about the weather, but nobody does anything about it.

Quoted by Mark Twain in one of his many humorous lectures, Warner's quip is still commonly misattributed to Twain.

"Maine law is constantly evaded....[a] sailor has only to step into a boat and give it a shove or two across the narrow stream that separates the United States from Deer Island...and return before he is missed".

— Charles Dudley Warner, 1857

He died in Hartford on October 20, 1900, and was interred at Cedar Hill Cemetery, with Mark Twain as a pall bearer and Joseph Twichell officiating.

The citizens of San Diego so appreciated Warner's flattering description of their city in his book Our Italy that they named three consecutive streets in the Point Loma neighborhood after him: Charles Street, Dudley Street, and Warner Street.

== Selected works ==
- My Summer in a Garden and Calvin [his cat], A Study of Character (Boston: James R. Osgood & Co., 1870)
- Saunterings (1872), descriptions of travel in Western Europe
- BackLog Studies (1872)
- Baddeck, And That Sort of Thing (1874), travels in Nova Scotia and elsewhere
- My Winter on the Nile (1876)
- In the Levant (1876)
- In the Wilderness (1878)
- A Roundabout Journey, in Europe (1883)
- On Horseback, in the Southern States (1888)
- Studies in the South and West, with Comments on Canada (1889)
- Our Italy, etc. [A description of Southern California.] (1891)
- The Relation of Literature to Life (1896)
- The People for Whom Shakespeare Wrote (1897)
- Fashions in Literature (1902)

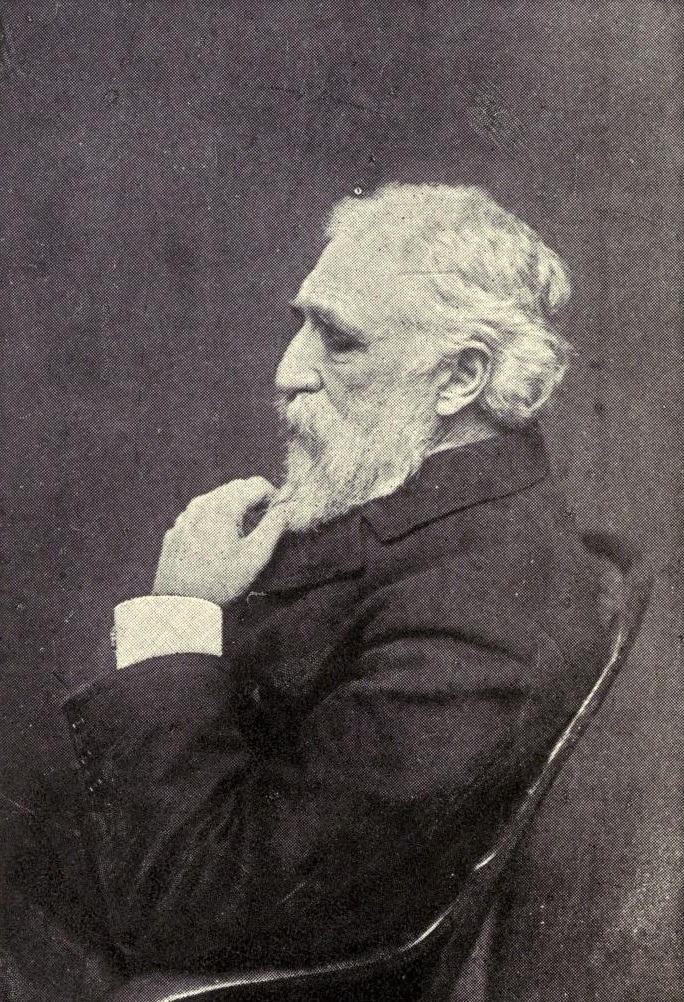
Charles Dudley Warner.

He edited The American Men of Letters series, to which he contributed a biography of Washington Irving (1881), and also edited a large Library of the World's Best Literature (1897). At the time of his death, Warner was writing a biography of his friend Frederic Edwin Church.

Essays

- A-Hunting of the Deer (1875)
- As We Were Saying (1891)
- As We Go (1893)

Novels

- The Gilded Age: A Tale of Today (in collaboration with Mark Twain, 1873)
- Their Pilgrimage (1886)
- A Little Journey in the World (1889)
- The Golden House (1894)
- That Fortune (1899).
