= Baddeck =

Village in Nova Scotia, Canada

Baddeck Miꞌkmawiꞌsimk: Apatakwitk Scottish Gaelic: Badaig
- Village
- Village of Baddeck
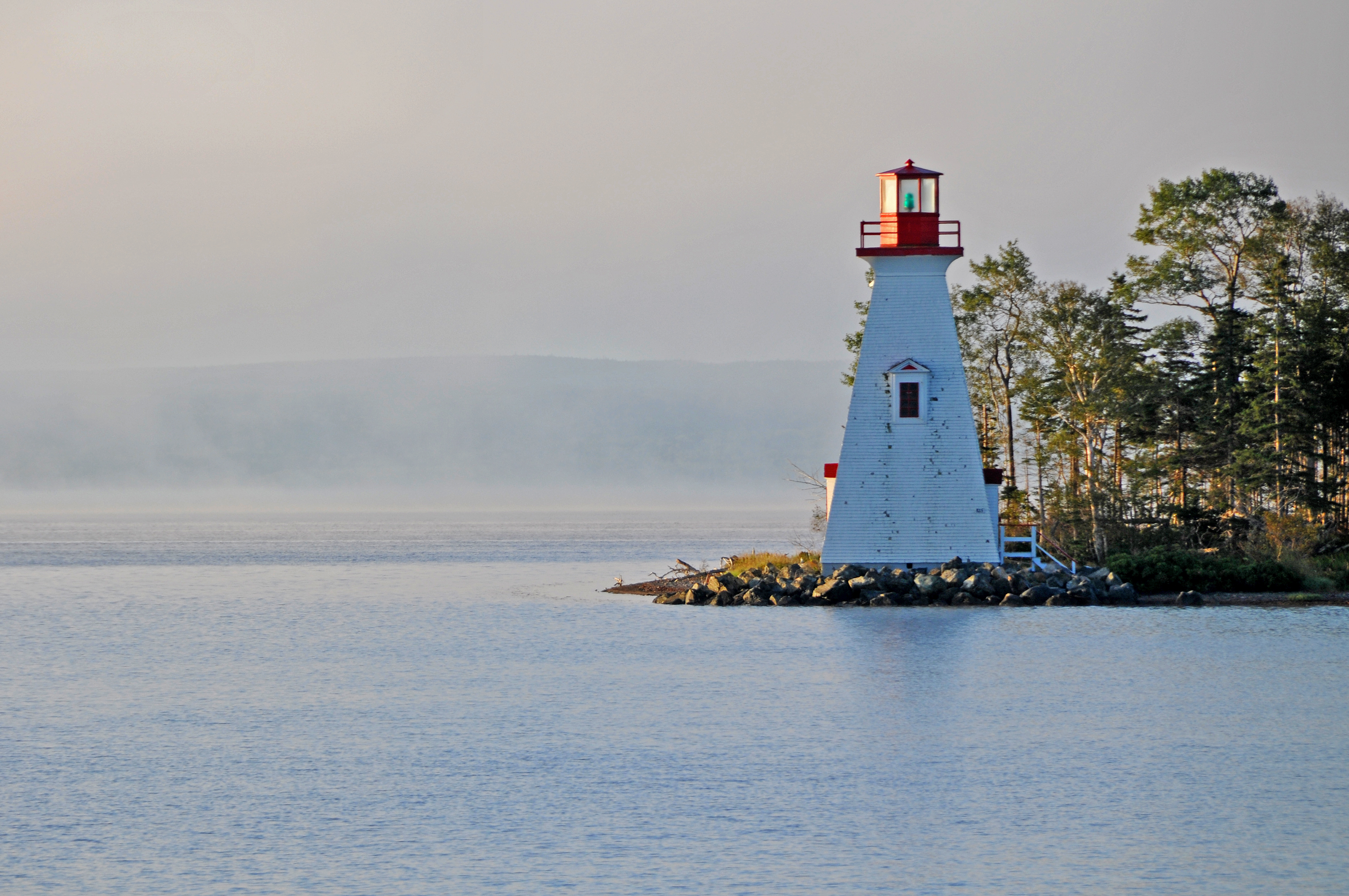
- The Kidston Island Lighthouse which also appears on the village seal.
- Interactive map of Baddeck
- Coordinates: 46°06′0″N 60°45′15″W
- Country: Canada
- Province: Nova Scotia
- Municipality: Victoria County
- Incorporated: 1908

Government
  - Type: Village commission

Area
  - Land: 2.11 km^{2} (0.81 sq mi)
- Highest elevation: 67 m (220 ft)
- Lowest elevation: 0 m (0 ft)

Population (2021)
  - Total: 818
  - Density: 388.6/km^{2} (1,006/sq mi)
- Time zone: UTC−4 (AST)
  - Summer (DST): UTC−3 (ADT)
- Canadian Postal Code: B0E 1B0
- Area code: 902
- Telephone Exchange: 295
- NTS Map: 11K2 Baddeck
- GNBC Code: CABFY
- Website: www.baddeckvillage.ca

Baddeck (/bəˈdɛk/) is a village on Cape Breton Island in northeastern Nova Scotia, Canada. It is situated in the centre of Cape Breton, approximately 6 km east of where the Baddeck River empties into Bras d'Or Lake.

Baddeck is the shire-town of the Municipality of Victoria County, with an elected village commission having limited authority over water, sewer, side streets and some bylaws. The population was 818 in the 2021 Census of Population.

The area was first occupied by Mi'kmaq people and later settled by United Empire Loyalists and Scottish Gaels in the late 18th and early 19th centuries. The area prospered in the 19th and early 20th centuries as a service and shipping center for surrounding mining, trapping, fishing, forestry, and farming activities. Today the economy depends on services, cultural activities, and tourism.

== Toponymy ==
The name Baddeck is based upon the Mi'kmaq language place name. Its original name, Apatakwitk, has been variously reported as meaning "reversing flow", "place with island near" (a likely reference to Kidston Island), "a portion of food set aside for someone", or "a sultry place". The French thus called it La Bedeque, while Canadian Gaelic speakers called it Badaig.

== History ==
French Jesuits settled at nearby St. Anns in 1629. British settlement came during the 1700s after the territory was ceded by France.

In 1839, a property containing an inn, a tavern, and a post office was built. In 1841, Charles James Campbell opened a store, began a shipbuilding operation, and developed coal mining in the nearby area of Cape Dauphin approximately 35 kilometers away.

In 1851 Victoria County was created from an area split off of Cape Breton County. Baddeck became the shire-town or county seat of the newly formed county: with a jail, court house and municipal offices.

Baddeck rose to fame in 1874, with the publication of the travel memoir Baddeck, And That Sort of Thing.

In 1885 the Alexander Graham Bell family had a vacation in Baddeck. He then built a complex of buildings, including a new laboratory, named Beinn Bhreagh (Gaelic: beautiful mountain) after Bell's ancestral Scottish highlands. Initially a summer residence, Bell spent an increasing part of the year there, and conducted many experiments, including the AEA Silver Dart's first controlled powered flight in Canada in 1909. From 1885 to 1928 the estate included the Bell Boatyard which made both experimental and traditional boats. The yard was notable for its dual focus on both experimental and traditional boats and for its employment of large numbers of female boatbuilders.

Bell is commemorated at the Alexander Graham Bell National Historic Site.

== Geography ==
The area sits on rocks from the Carboniferous Windsor Group. These include rock salt, limestone, potash, and gypsum, which are easily dissolved by groundwater and creates caves and sinkholes.

=== Climate ===
Baddeck experiences a humid continental climate (Dfb). The highest temperature ever recorded in Baddeck was 36.7 °C (98 °F) on 22 August 1935. The coldest temperature ever recorded was −32.2 °C (−26 °F) on 11 February 1883.

Climate data for Baddeck (Alexander Graham Bell National Historic Site), 1981–2010 normals, extremes 1875–2016
Month	Jan	Feb	Mar	Apr	May	Jun	Jul	Aug	Sep	Oct	Nov	Dec	Year
Record high °C (°F)	17.0 (62.6)	12.2 (54.0)	23.5 (74.3)	25.6 (78.1)	30.6 (87.1)	33.9 (93.0)	35.0 (95.0)	36.7 (98.1)	33.0 (91.4)	28.9 (84.0)	22.8 (73.0)	17.2 (63.0)	36.7 (98.1)
Mean daily maximum °C (°F)	−1.1 (30.0)	−1.1 (30.0)	2.2 (36.0)	7.3 (45.1)	14.0 (57.2)	19.0 (66.2)	23.0 (73.4)	23.1 (73.6)	19.1 (66.4)	12.9 (55.2)	7.1 (44.8)	2.0 (35.6)	10.6 (51.1)
Daily mean °C (°F)	−5.4 (22.3)	−5.8 (21.6)	−2.3 (27.9)	3.2 (37.8)	9.0 (48.2)	13.9 (57.0)	18.1 (64.6)	18.5 (65.3)	14.6 (58.3)	8.9 (48.0)	3.8 (38.8)	−1.5 (29.3)	6.3 (43.3)
Mean daily minimum °C (°F)	−9.6 (14.7)	−10.5 (13.1)	−6.8 (19.8)	−0.9 (30.4)	4.0 (39.2)	8.7 (47.7)	13.3 (55.9)	13.7 (56.7)	10.0 (50.0)	4.8 (40.6)	0.5 (32.9)	−4.9 (23.2)	1.9 (35.4)
Record low °C (°F)	−29.0 (−20.2)	−32.2 (−26.0)	−31.1 (−24.0)	−15.6 (3.9)	−7.2 (19.0)	−5.6 (21.9)	−1.1 (30.0)	1.7 (35.1)	−2.2 (28.0)	−5.6 (21.9)	−14.0 (6.8)	−22.2 (−8.0)	−32.2 (−26.0)
Average precipitation mm (inches)	155.0 (6.10)	125.6 (4.94)	128.6 (5.06)	125.8 (4.95)	104.0 (4.09)	104.8 (4.13)	97.5 (3.84)	107.2 (4.22)	127.8 (5.03)	137.1 (5.40)	155.0 (6.10)	166.3 (6.55)	1,534.7 (60.42)
Average rainfall mm (inches)	73.3 (2.89)	59.1 (2.33)	79.7 (3.14)	106.5 (4.19)	103.0 (4.06)	104.8 (4.13)	97.5 (3.84)	107.2 (4.22)	127.8 (5.03)	136.0 (5.35)	132.5 (5.22)	95.4 (3.76)	1,222.6 (48.13)
Average snowfall cm (inches)	81.7 (32.2)	66.6 (26.2)	48.9 (19.3)	19.4 (7.6)	1.0 (0.4)	0.0 (0.0)	0.0 (0.0)	0.0 (0.0)	0.0 (0.0)	1.1 (0.4)	22.5 (8.9)	71.0 (28.0)	312.0 (122.8)
Average precipitation days (≥ 0.2 mm)	19.5	14.7	14.3	14.8	13.8	13.0	12.8	13.2	14.3	16.8	20.1	20.1	187.3
Average rainy days (≥ 0.2 mm)	7.5	6.0	8.5	12.6	13.8	13.0	12.8	13.2	14.3	16.4	16.4	9.8	144.3
Average snowy days (≥ 0.2 cm)	14.6	10.6	7.2	3.5	0.26	0.0	0.0	0.0	0.0	0.47	4.8	12.4	53.9
Source: Environment Canada

== Demographics ==
In the 2021 Census of Population conducted by Statistics Canada, Baddeck had a population of 818 living in 368 of its 415 total private dwellings, a change of −1% from its 2016 population of 826. With a land area of 2.11 km^{2} (0.81 sq mi), it had a population density of 387.7/km^{2} (1,004.1/sq mi) in 2021.

== Attractions ==
Baddeck is one of several Cape Breton communities that plays host to the Celtic Colours festival each fall. The music festival features hundreds of Celtic musicians from Cape Breton and around the world.

In the spring, the village hosts the Cabot Trail Relay Race, a 298 km (185-mile) relay race around the Cabot Trail.

The Cabot Trail, a scenic route, passes through Baddeck.

Historic structures in the town include:

- Telegraph House hotel, 1861, first came to prominence after it was featured in the 1874 book Baddeck, And That Sort of Thing. It once housed the Trans-Oceanic Cable Company, a pioneer in telegraphy.
- Saint Peter's and Saint John's Anglican Church, 1883, wooden Gothic Revival church.
- Gilbert H. Grosvenor Hall, 1886, Romanesque Revival structure of local red sandstone, originally built as the Baddeck Post Office and Custom House.
- Victoria County Court House, 1889, Neoclassical wood and granite building.
- Bras d'Or House, circa 1894, heavily remodelled, now houses apartments and a Chinese restaurant.
- St. Mark's Masonic Lodge, 1898, built in the style of a church, featuring elaborate architectural and Masonic details, many of which now covered with vinyl siding.
- Kidston Island Lighthouse, 1912, accessible by ferry in the summer.

== Education ==
Baddeck Academy: pre-primary to grade 12 school serving Baddeck and the surrounding communities.

== Services ==
- Bras d'Or Yacht Club
- Bell Bay Golf Club
- Baddeck (Guneden) Aerodrome

== Gallery ==
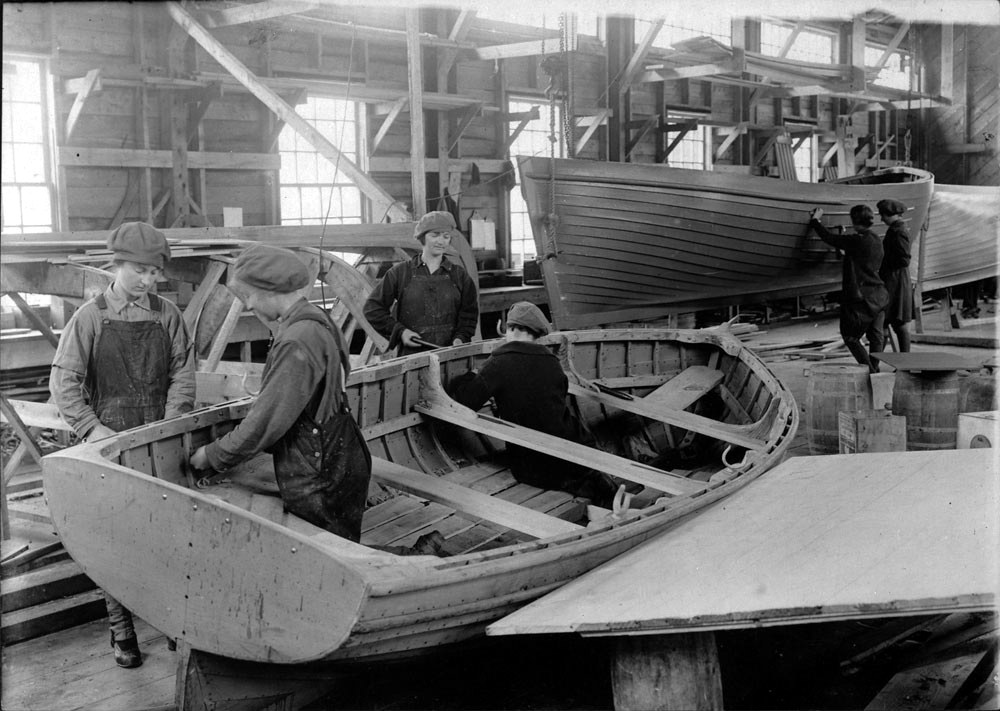
Women workers at Bell's shipyard

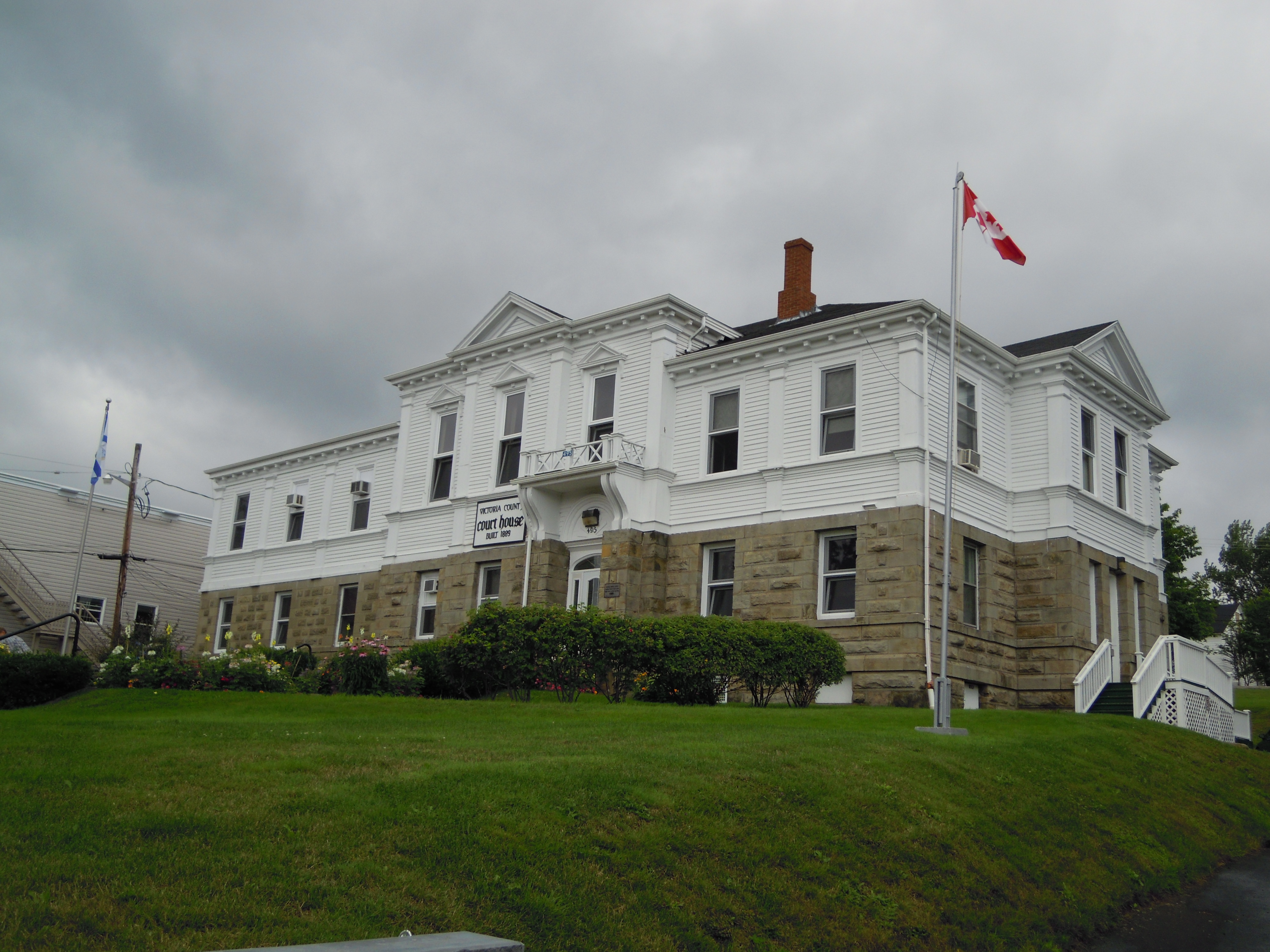
Victoria County Court House

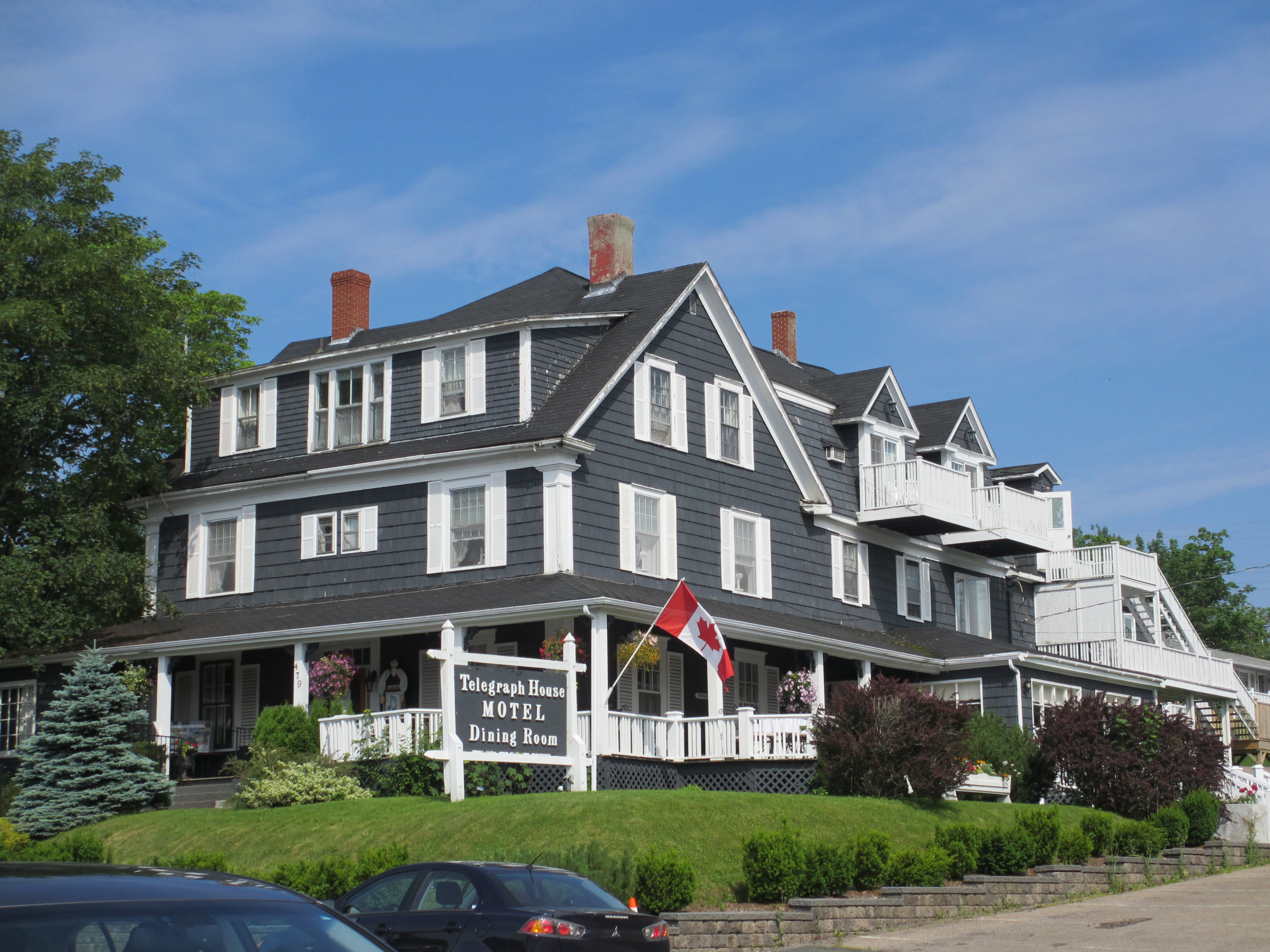
Telegraph House

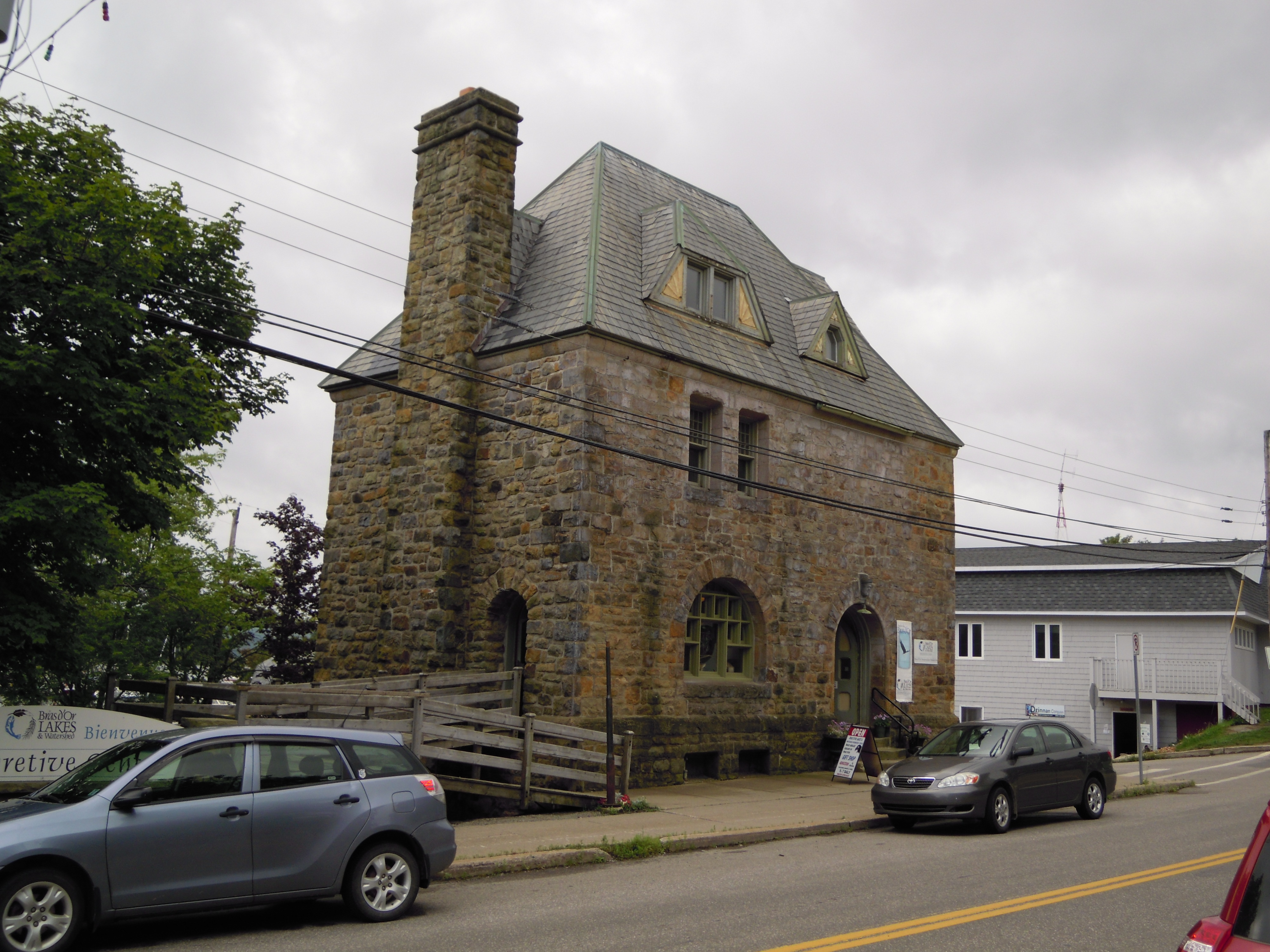
Old post office and customs house

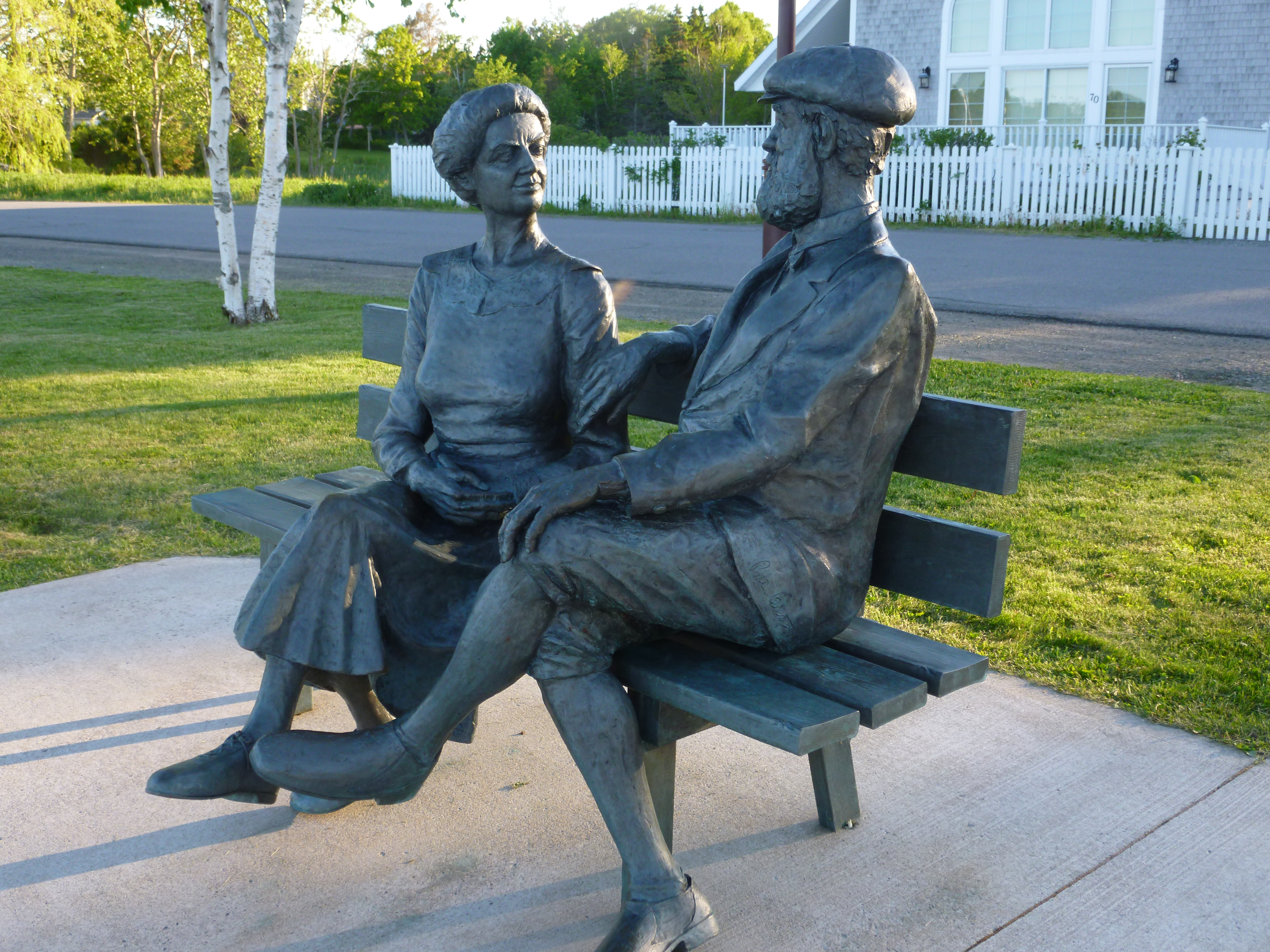
Alexander and Mabel Bell statue
