= Baddeck, and That Sort of Thing =

1874 book by Charles Dudley Warner

Baddeck, And That Sort of Thing
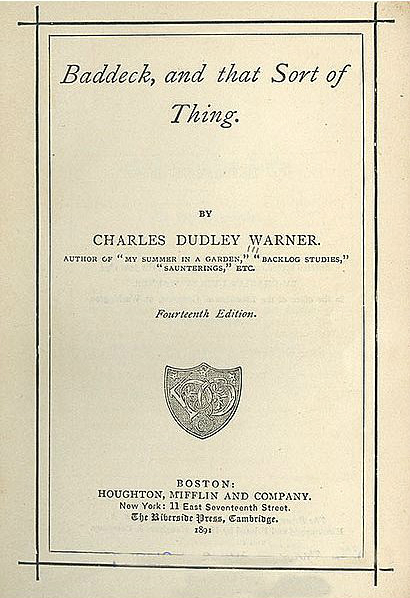
- Cover of the 1891 edition
- Author: Charles Dudley Warner
- Language: English
- Genre: Travel literature
- Publication date: 1874
- Publication place: United States
- Media type: Print
- Preceded by: The Gilded Age: A Tale of Today (1873)
- Followed by: My Winter on the Nile (1876)

Baddeck, And That Sort of Thing is a travel journal written by Charles Dudley Warner, the American author who co-wrote The Gilded Age: A Tale of Today with Mark Twain.

In 1873, Joseph Twichell invited Warner to accompany him on a trip to Baddeck, Nova Scotia. Warner subsequently wrote an account of this trip, which became Baddeck, And That Sort of Thing. The book helped launch Baddeck, and Cape Breton more broadly, as a tourist destination and may have influenced Alexander Graham Bell's decision to build a home in Baddeck. While Warner's story may have had a positive impact on Cape Breton's economy, the story angered many Cape Bretoners for its portrayal of them as simple and backward.

== See also ==
- Literature of Nova Scotia
