= Nova Scotia Highway 105 =

Highway in Nova Scotia

Highway 105
- Route Transcanadienne
- Mabel and Alexander Graham Bell Way; Trans-Canada Highway
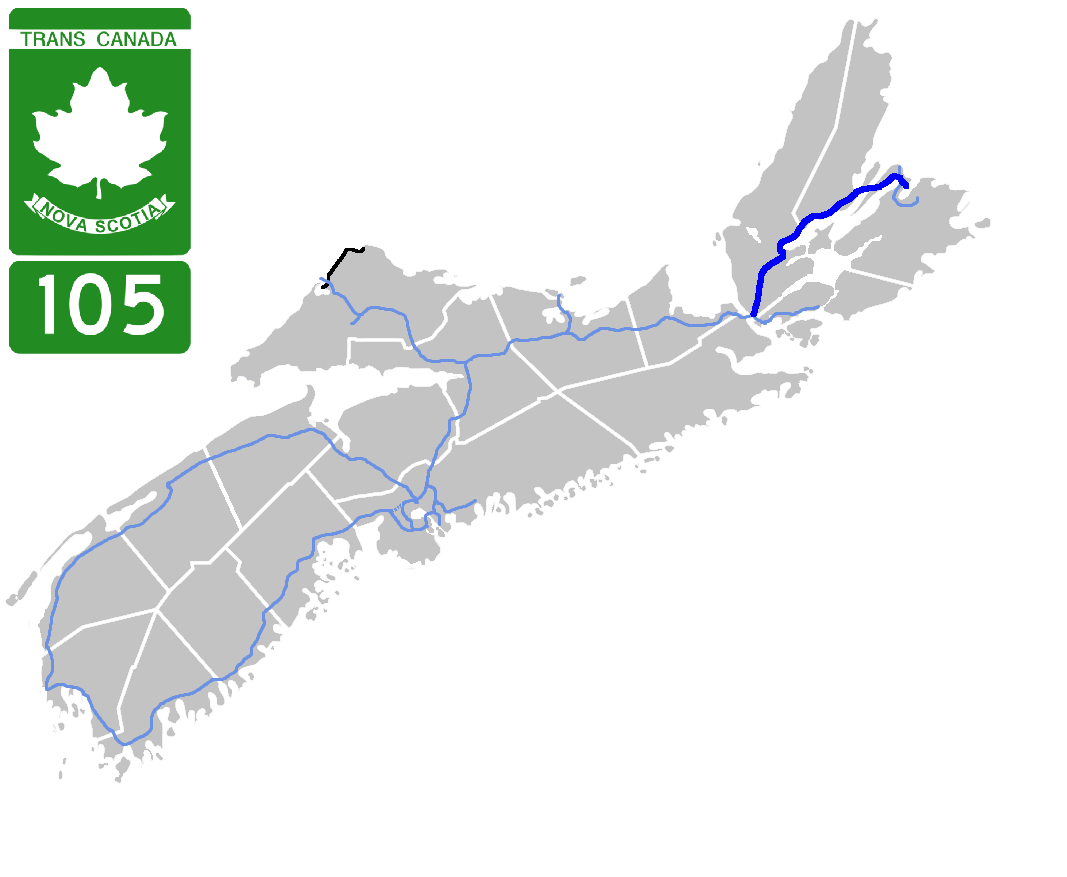

Route information
- Maintained by Department of Transportation and Infrastructure Renewal
- Length: 141.8 km (88.1 mi)
- Existed: 1970–present

Major junctions
- West end: Hwy 104 (TCH) / Trunk 4 / Trunk 19 near Port Hawkesbury
- Cabot Trail near Nyanza; Cabot Trail near St. Anns; Hwy 162 in Bras d'Or; Hwy 125 near Sydney Mines
- East end: Marine Atlantic ferry terminal in North Sydney

Location
- Country: Canada
- Province: Nova Scotia

Highway system
- Trans-Canada Highway; Provincial highways in Nova Scotia; 100-series
← Hwy 104 (TCH)	→ Hwy 106 (TCH)

Highway 105 in Nova Scotia represents the Cape Breton Island leg of the Trans-Canada Highway. It runs from the Port Hastings Rotary just east of the Canso Causeway in Port Hastings to the Marine Atlantic ferry terminal in North Sydney, representing a distance of 142 kilometres (88 mi).

In 2010, the provincial government named the entire highway Mabel and Alexander Graham Bell Way in honour of Mabel Gardiner Hubbard and her husband Alexander Graham Bell, who resided and are buried at Beinn Bhreagh near Baddeck.

== Route description ==
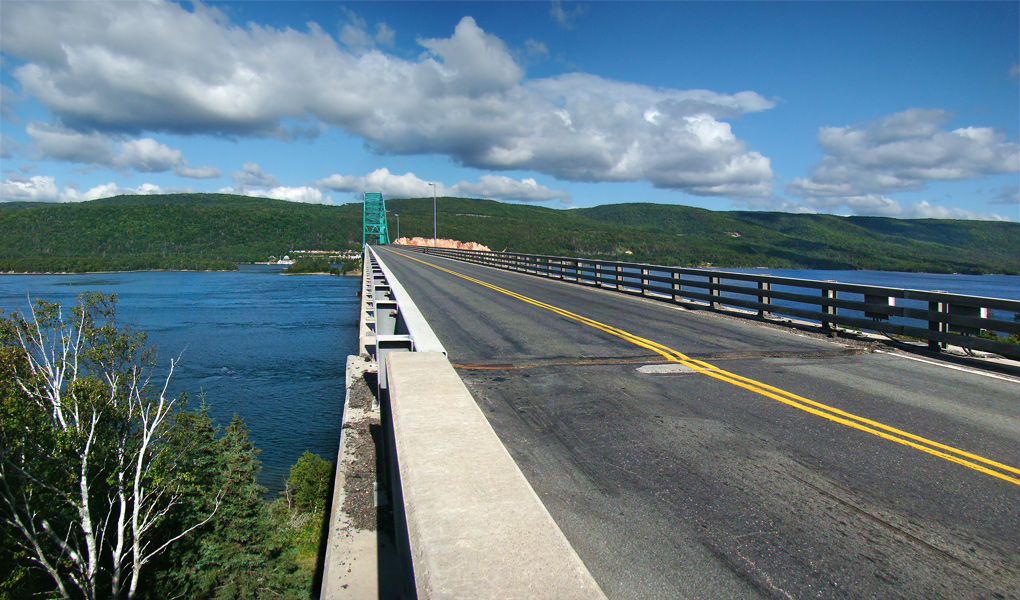
Highway 105 crosses the Great Bras d'Or Channel of Bras d'Or Lake using the Seal Island Bridge.

The highway travels northeast from Port Hastings along the base of a group of mountains known as "The Big Ridge" to Whycocomagh. It then follows the north shore of Bras d'Or Lake, bypassing Baddeck on a short Super two controlled access segment. Still running in a general northeast direction, at St. Anns the highway begins ascending the west slope of Kelly's Mountain on the Cape Dauphin Peninsula. Highway 105 descends the east slope of Kelly's Mountain using a series of sharp turns including a 180° hairpin turn at New Harris Forks before crossing the Great Bras d'Or Channel of Bras d'Or Lake on the Seal Island Bridge. The road crosses Boularderie Island using another short Super two controlled access segment and then runs southeast as an uncontrolled access road through the villages of Bras d'Or and Florence. Highway 105 regains controlled access for the final 3 km (1.9 mi) to its eastern terminus at the Marine Atlantic ferry terminal in North Sydney where travellers can continue to Newfoundland.

With some minor exceptions noted above, the highway is two lanes and uncontrolled access. In addition, there are two intersections controlled by traffic lights in Florence.

The Cabot Trail, which is usually used to describe a different road, is signed along a portion of Highway 105 between Nyanza and St. Anns so that the signed route forms a loop.

== History ==
Highway 105 is descended from the former Trunk 5, which no longer exists; Highway 105 follows the old Trunk 5 alignment, using present Routes 205, 305 and roads named after it to serve areas bypassed by Highway 105. The 105 name was applied in 1970.

Trunk 5 was a provincial trunk road in Victoria County and the Cape Breton Regional Municipality between Boularderie East and Millville Boularderie on Boularderie Island in Nova Scotia. The route, known as Millville Highway, was the main highway before Nova Scotia Highway 105 opened. It originally extended from Sydney River to Port Hawkesbury. It is now commonly known as Old Route 5.

== Exit list ==
County	Location	km	mi	Exit	Destinations	Notes
Inverness	Port Hastings	0.0	0.0	1	Hwy 104 (TCH) west / Trunk 4 west – Canso Causeway, Antigonish; Trunk 4 east to Hwy 104 east (Fleur-de-lis Trail) – Port Hawkesbury, St. Peter's, Sydney; Trunk 19 north (Ceilidh Trail) – Inverness, Port Hood, Margaree Forks	Exit 41 on Hwy 104; roundabout; Trans-Canada Highway follows Hwy 104 west
Inverness	Kingsville	18.0	11.2	2	Riverside Road	At-grade
Inverness	Melford	30.8	19.1	3	River Denys Road	At-grade
Inverness	Iron Mines	42.6	26.5	4	Orangedale Road (Bras d'Or Lakes Scenic Drive)	At-grade
Inverness	Whycocomagh	47.6	29.6	5	Route 252 north to Route 395 – Mabou, Lake Ainslie, Margaree Forks, Chéticamp	At-grade
Victoria	Aberdeen	58.6	36.4	6	Route 223 south (Bras d'Or Lakes Scenic Drive) – Little Narrows, Grand Narrows, Iona	At-grade
Victoria	Nyanza	75.7	47.0	7	Cabot Trail (Trunk 30) to Trunk 19 – Margaree Forks, Chéticamp, Inverness	At-grade; unsigned Trunk 30; west end of Cabot Trail concurrency
Victoria	Baddeck	83.7	52.0	8	Route 205 east	At-grade
Victoria	Baddeck	85.6	53.2	9	To Route 205 / Riverside Road	
Victoria	MacAulays Hill	94.6	58.8	10	Route 205 west – Baddeck	At-grade
Victoria	St. Anns	103.4	64.2	11	Cabot Trail (Trunk 30) – Ingonish	At-grade; unsigned Trunk 30; east end of Cabot Trail concurrency
Victoria	Englishtown	107.5	66.8	12	Route 312 north – Englishtown Ferry, Ingonish	At-grade
Victoria		118.7– 119.5	73.8– 74.3	Seal Island Bridge crosses Great Bras d'Or Channel (Bras d'Or Lake)		
Victoria	Big Bank	120.1	74.6	13	Kempt Head Road (Bras d'Or Lakes Scenic Drive) – Ross Ferry, Kempt Head	At-grade
Victoria	Boularderie East	122.0	75.8	14	Old Trunk 5 – Big Bras d'Or, Black Rock	At-grade
Cape Breton	New Dominion	126.3	78.5	15	St. James Road	At-grade
Cape Breton	Millville Boularderie	132.2	82.1	16	Millville Road – Millville, Big Bras d'Or	At-grade
Cape Breton	Bras d'Or	134.9	83.8	17	Hwy 162 north (Prince Mine Road)	At-grade
Cape Breton	Bras d'Or	135.4	84.1		Hillside Boularderie Road (Bras d'Or Lakes Scenic Drive)	At-grade
Cape Breton	Bras d'Or	136.0	84.5	Crosses St. Andrews Channel (Bras d'Or Lake)		
Cape Breton	Bras d'Or	136.4	84.8	18	Route 305 east / Church Road (Bras d'Or Lakes Scenic Drive) – Alder Point, Georges River	At-grade
Cape Breton	Florence	137.8	85.6	19	Park Road	At-grade
Cape Breton	Sydney Mines	139.1	86.4	20	Hwy 125 east / Main Street – Sydney, Glace Bay, Louisbourg, Sydney Mines	Signed as Exit 20E (east) and 20W (west); exit 1 on Hwy 125
Cape Breton	North Sydney	141.8	88.1	21	Route 305 (Queen Street) – North Sydney, Sydney Mines	
Cape Breton	North Sydney	141.8	88.1	North Sydney Ferry Terminal		
Cabot Strait				Marine Atlantic ferry to Channel-Port aux Basques (year-round) and Argentia (June–September)		
Cabot Strait				–	Route 1 (TCH) east – Corner Brook, St. John's	Continues in Newfoundland and Labrador
1.000 mi = 1.609 km; 1.000 km = 0.621 mi: Concurrency terminus; Tolled; Note: Exit numbers in Nova Scotia are sequential.

Trans-Canada Highway
Previous route Highway 104	Highway 105	Next route NL Route 1
