= Bras d'Or Lakes Scenic Drive =

Scenic roadway in Nova Scotia, Canada

Route information
- Length: 417 km (259 mi)
- Component highways: Trunk 4; Hwy 105 (TCH); Route 205; Route 216; Route 223

Major junctions
- Tourist loop around Bras d'Or Lake

Location
- Country: Canada
- Province: Nova Scotia
- Counties: Cape Breton Regional Municipality, Inverness, Victoria

Highway system
- Provincial highways in Nova Scotia; 100-series

The Bras d'Or Lakes Scenic Drive is a scenic roadway on Nova Scotia's Cape Breton Island. It extends around the perimeter of Bras d'Or Lake.

== Routes ==
=== Numbered ===
- Highway 105
- Trunk 4
- Route 205
- Route 216
- Route 223

=== Named Roads ===
- Church Road
- Georges River Road
- Gillis Point Road
- Hillside Boularderie Road
- Kempt Head Road
- Little Narrows Road
- Long Island Road
- Marble Mountain Road
- Orangedale Road
- St. Columbia Road
- Steele Cross Road
- Washabuck Road
- West Bay Road

== Communities ==
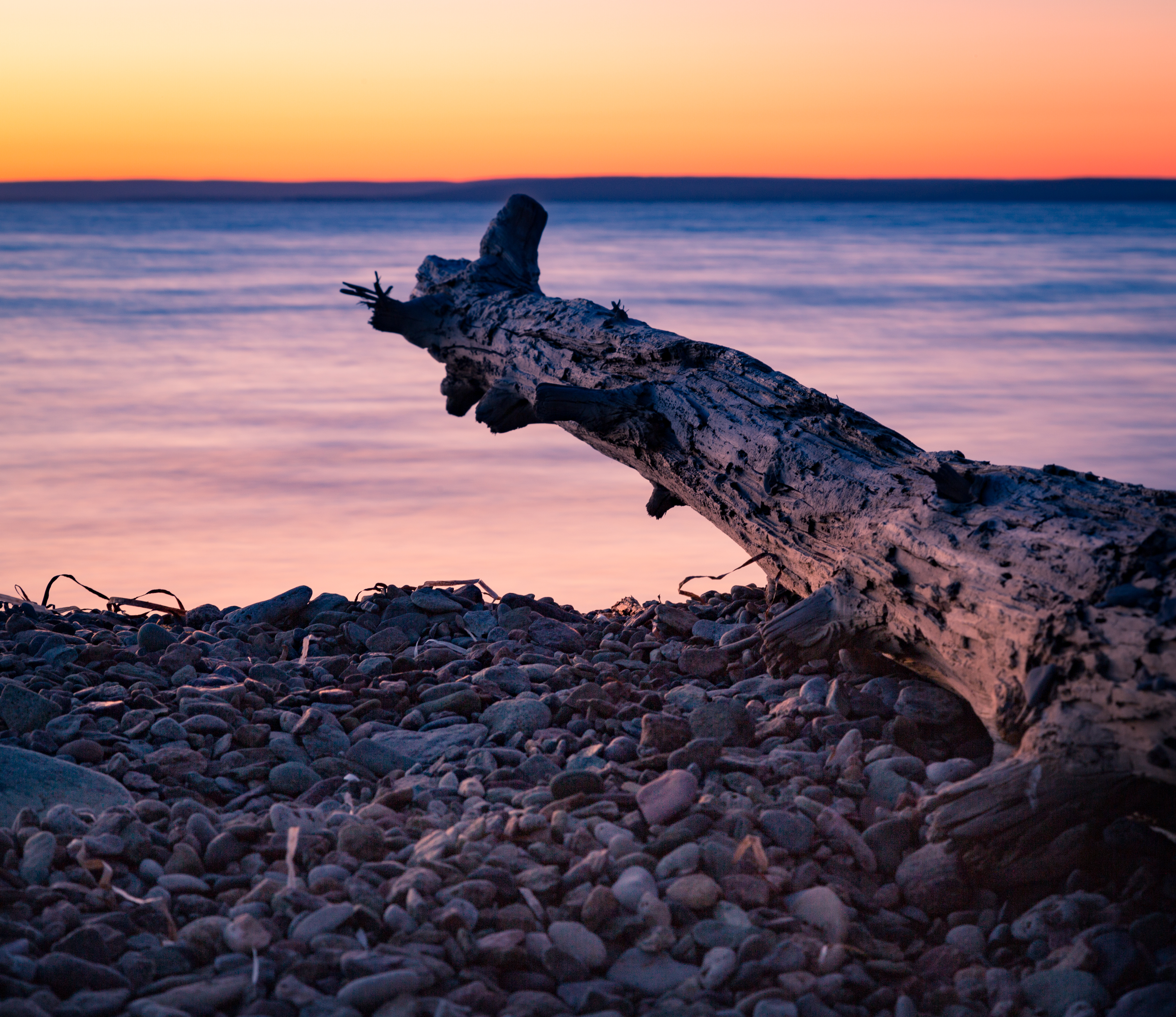
Sunset over Bras d'Or Lake in Irish Cove, Nova Scotia, in September 2015

- Baddeck
- Boularderie Island
- Little Bras d'Or
- Boisdale
- Big Beach
- Bras d'Or
- Christmas Island
- Grand Narrows
- Eskasoni
- East Bay
- Ben Eoin
- Irish Cove
- Chapel Island
- St. Peter's
- Dundee
- West Bay
- Marble Mountain
- Orangedale
- Whycocomagh
- Bucklaw
- Little Narrows
- Iona
- Washabuck
- Nyanza

== Parks ==
- Battery Provincial Park
- Ben Eoin Provincial Park
- Bras d'Or Lookoff and Picnic Park
- Dalem Lake Provincial Park
- Groves Point Provincial Park
- MacCormack Provincial Picnic Park,
- Whycocomagh Provincial Park

== Bridges ==
- Barra Strait Bridge
- Crowdis Bridge
- Seal Island Bridge
