= Dalem Lake Provincial Park =

Provincial park in Nova Scotia, Canada

- Interactive map of Dalem Lake Provincial Park
- Type: Provincial Park
- Location: Dalem Lake & New Dominion, Nova Scotia, Canada
- Nearest city: North Sydney, Nova Scotia
- Coordinates: 46°14′47″N 60°25′56″W
- Website: Dalem Lake Provincial Park

Dalem Lake Provincial Park is a provincial park located in the Canadian province of Nova Scotia on Boularderie Island.

Straddling the county line between Victoria and Cape Breton counties, the park is located in the communities of Dalem Lake and New Dominion and is adjacent to the communities of Big Bras d'Or, Millville Boularderie and Black Brook.

The 74 hectare picnic park is managed by the provincial Department of Natural Resources and completely surrounds Dalem Lake, a small lake that is almost perfectly circular - it sometimes also referred to by locals as "Round Lake". The lake has a small sand beach suitable for swimming and is popular for paddling such as canoeing and kayaking. The park also permits licensed trout fishing. There is a 1 kilometre hiking trail encircling the lake.

The park is open for day use (from dawn to dusk), from May 15 to October 12. There is no charge for using the park and its facilities.

Dalem Lake Provincial Park was established by Order in Council (OIC) 77-82 on January 25, 1977. Civic address: 220 New Dominion Rd., Boularderie, Nova Scotia.

== Sources ==
- Dalem Lake Provincial Park - Outdoors - Provincial Parks and Community Parks
- Map of Dalem Lake Provincial Park
- http://local.google.ca/local?q=%22dalem%20lake%22%20map&hl=en&lr=&sa=N&tab=wl
