= List of communities in Victoria County, Nova Scotia =

This is a list of communities in Victoria County, Nova Scotia.

- Baddeck: a village within the Municipality of the County of Victoria
- Unincorporated areas
  - Big Bras d'Or
  - Cape North
  - Dingwall
  - Englishtown
  - Ingonish
  - Iona
  - Neil's Harbour
  - St. Anns
  - South Harbour
- Wagmatcook 1 and Wagmatcook First Nation, reserves
