= Seal Island Bridge =

Canadian road bridge

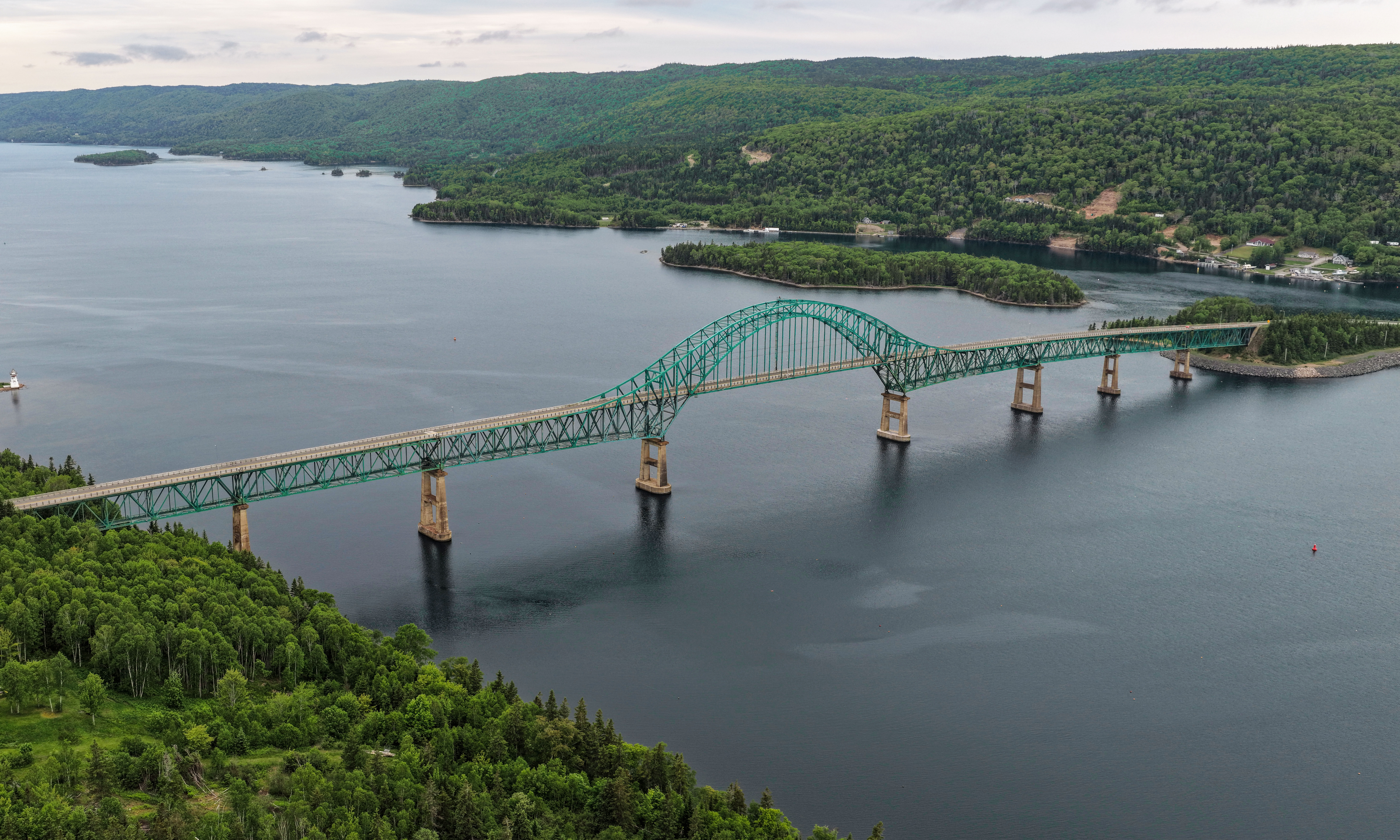
- The Seal Island Bridge as seen from the east
- Coordinates: 46°14′2.84″N 60°29′32.78″W
- Carries: (Trans-Canada Highway 105) Motor vehicles
- Crosses: Great Bras d'Or
- Locale: Cape Breton Island (Victoria County, Nova Scotia – Boularderie Island)
- Official name: Great Bras d'Or Crossing
- Other name: Seal Island Bridge
- Maintained by: Department of Transportation and Infrastructure Renewal (Nova Scotia)

Characteristics
- Design: Through arch bridge, Truss arch bridge
- Material: Steel
- Trough construction: Steel and Reinforced concrete
- Pier construction: Reinforced concrete, faced with stone at the waterline
- Total length: 716.28 m (2,350 ft)
- Width: 2 lanes
- Longest span: 152.4 m (500 ft)
- No. of spans: 8
- Piers in water: 7
- Clearance below: 36 m (118 ft) at centre-span

History
- Construction start: 1960
- Construction cost: $4,652,850
- Opened: 1961
- Rebuilt: 2001-2004 (Deck replacement)
- Replaces: ferry service at Ross Ferry/Big Harbour and Big Bras d'Or/New Campbellton

Statistics
- Daily traffic: 7,500 vehicles/day, peak periods
- Toll: none

Location
- Interactive map of Seal Island Bridge

The Seal Island Bridge is a bridge located in Victoria County, Nova Scotia. It is the third longest bridge span in the province.

The bridge is a through arch design and crosses the Great Bras d'Or channel of Bras d'Or Lake, connecting Boularderie Centre, Boularderie Island on the south side with New Harris, Cape Breton Island on the north side.

== Controversy ==
The location of the bridge had proven controversial. It replaced two ferry services crossing the Great Bras d'Or; one at the northeastern end between New Campbellton-Big Bras d'Or, and the other at the southwestern end at Big Harbour-Ross Ferry.

For political reasons, it was decided to place the bridge halfway between the two ferry services on account of an outcry by communities fearing the loss of their transportation links. This required an extensive modification to the Trans-Canada Highway route on the eastern slope of Kelly's Mountain (240 m (790 ft) high), resulting in a 180° "switchback", and the decision has been blamed for accidents on this stretch of highway.

According to Dr. Ron Stewart with the Boularderie Island Historical Society, and a former provincial health minister:

"There were mixed emotions at the time because we had two or three ferries at one time going across the Great Bras d'Or channel and that was a big deal then. There were small communities built around the ferry service in a sense. So, you know, we weren't all that enthusiastic about it because we didn't really see the bigger picture that this was part of the Trans-Canada Highway to Newfoundland."

== Construction ==
Construction of the Seal Island Bridge began in 1960 as part of the Trans-Canada Highway project. The bridge, officially known as the Great Bras d'Or Crossing, was completed in 1961 at a cost of $4,652,850. The construction of 23 kilometres (14 mi) of approach roads increased the total cost of the project to about $6 million. The bridge is a crucial link in the Trans Canada Highway between Sydney and Baddeck, carrying more than 7,500 vehicles a day in peak periods. The structure carries two traffic lanes of Highway 105 and was originally constructed with a pedestrian sidewalk on each side.

The bridge crosses part of the channel on a causeway connecting the north shore of the channel to Seal Island, a small wooded island. The structure consists of eight steel box truss spans, three simply supported 76.2 m (250 ft) approach spans, two simply-supported 76.2 m (250 ft) splay spans, and a three-span continuous main span that consists of two 106.68 m (350 ft) side spans and a 152.4 m (500 ft) centre arch span. The steel structure is supported on tall reinforced concrete piers, armoured with cut stone at the waterline.

== Bridge operation ==
=== Closures due to wind ===
Due to the bridge's height and location in a deep valley that can funnel winds, the Seal Island Bridge occasionally is closed to high-sided vehicles such as transport trucks. There have been a number of incidents on the bridge over the years with winds toppling transport trucks. These closures can last for a number of hours, causing traffic to back up. RCMP will stop high-sided vehicles at the bridge and inform they cannot cross. At times as many as 15 to 20 transport trucks can be lined up, waiting for conditions to improve so they can make the crossing.

=== 2001-2004 Deck replacement ===
By 2001, it was found the existing cast-in-place concrete bridge deck was in poor condition. Forty years of wear and tear from traffic as well as exposure to wind and salt spray necessitated a major overhaul of the Seal Island Bridge. The road deck needed complete replacement, and the steel truss work needed reinforcement. Engineers thoroughly inspected the rest of the bridge structure and found it to be sound and safe.

A major deck replacement project was undertaken. Over the next three years, the original cast-in-place concrete bridge deck was removed and replaced using full-depth, precast, prestressed, half-deck width concrete panels. It was necessary to complete one lane at a time, starting with the south lane, leaving the other deck in place so the bridge could continue to be used for vehicular traffic. Construction was completed with minimal traffic disruptions, and the bridge remained open to single lane traffic throughout construction, with the exception of three, six-hour overnight closures planned per week. This project added several decades to the useful life of the bridge.

The new high performance precast concrete deck system is much more durable than conventional systems since it is less permeable and crack-free under service load conditions. The deck system adopted is significantly lighter than a conventional cast-in-place concrete deck system. This has resulted in considerable savings in the amount of truss reinforcement required, while providing sufficient mass and stiffness for damping purposes. At the same time the guard rails (traffic barriers) were replaced over the entire length of the bridge, with the new guard rails set inside the main bridge trusses to better protect them from vehicle impact. Unfortunately, this made the new bridge deck too narrow to retain the sidewalks, so they were not replaced. However, this modification did result in wider traffic lanes. The overall cost of the bridge deck reconstruction was $15 million. There are now "No pedestrian traffic" signs on each end of the bridge.

=== Awards ===
On 20 April 2004, it was announced the Seal Island Bridge Reconstruction Project had won the Lieutenant Governor's Award for Engineering Excellence. The Department of Transportation and Public Works shared the honours with consultants CBCL Limited of Halifax for the major overhaul of the province's third largest bridge.

=== 2016 Beam failure and replacement ===
In November 2016, one of the center arch span truss diagonal beams experienced a fatigue failure, resulting in the beam cracking through completely. This resulted in the center arch span displacing vertically 38 mm. The cracked beam was visible from the roadway and a motorist reported damage to the beam on 23 October. Crews immediately completed a temporary repair, but the structural engineer did a complete structural analysis and recommended that the entire beam be replaced. The beam was replaced by 10 November 2016.

=== 2023 beginning of multi-year rehabilitation ===
In late 2021, the Nova Scotia Department of Public Works released a benefit-cost analysis of the Seal Island Bridge intended to determine the best way forward to maintain the crossing, examining various rehabilitation options to extend the life of the bridge over 15, 25, and possibly 50-year terms. Options for a complete replacement of the existing bridge were also examined.

November 2023 saw the beginning of a project of refurbishment, with the awarding of a tender to upgrade steel trusses on the bridge. Further tenders were expected to be tendered for this project in 2024 and 2025, with completion of the rehabilitation work expected in 2028. The rehabilitation project is expected to cost upwards of $45 million. The long-term plan for the bridge is now for a complete replacement of the crossing sometime in the future.

== Gallery ==
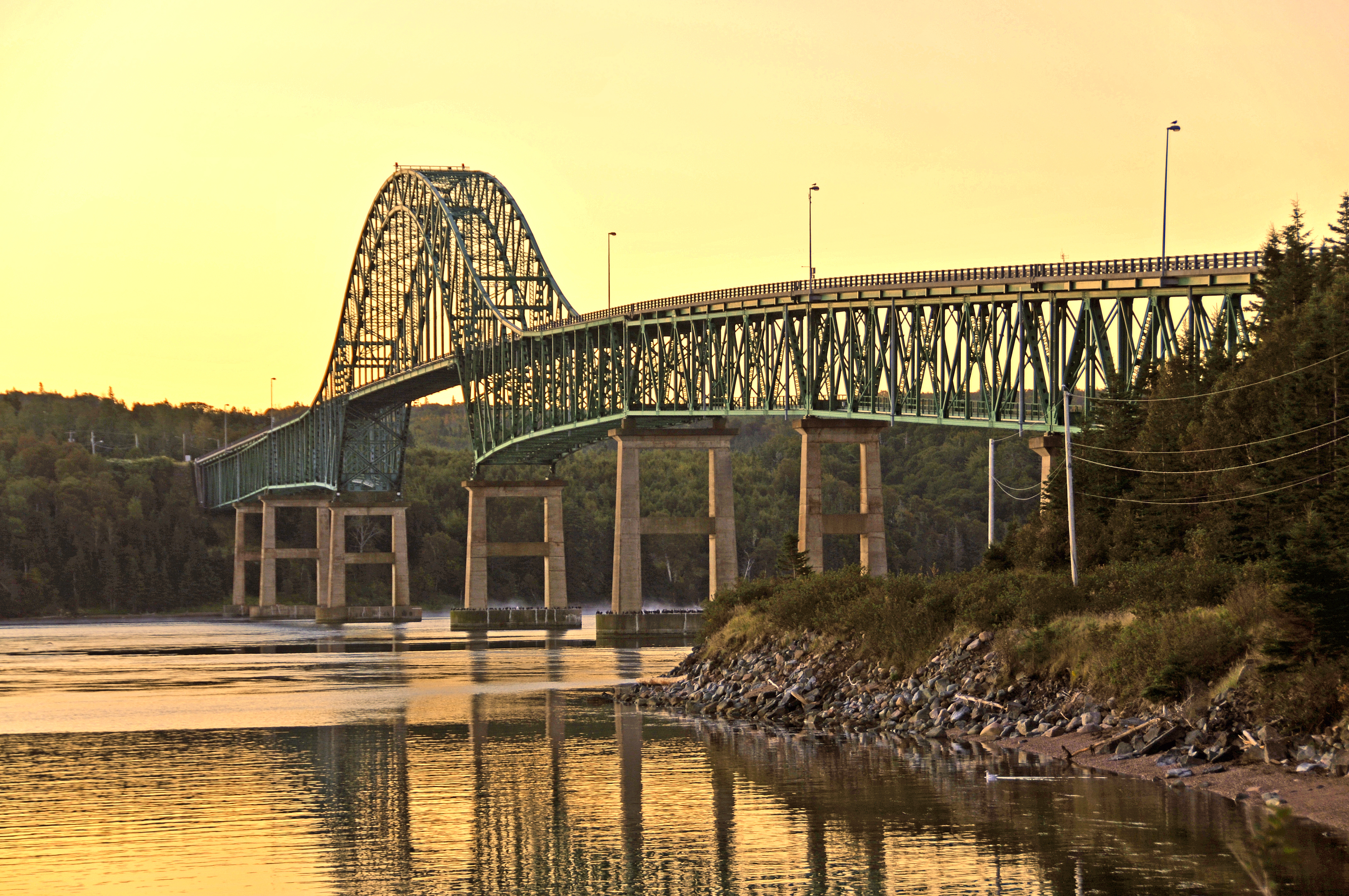
The Seal Island Bridge

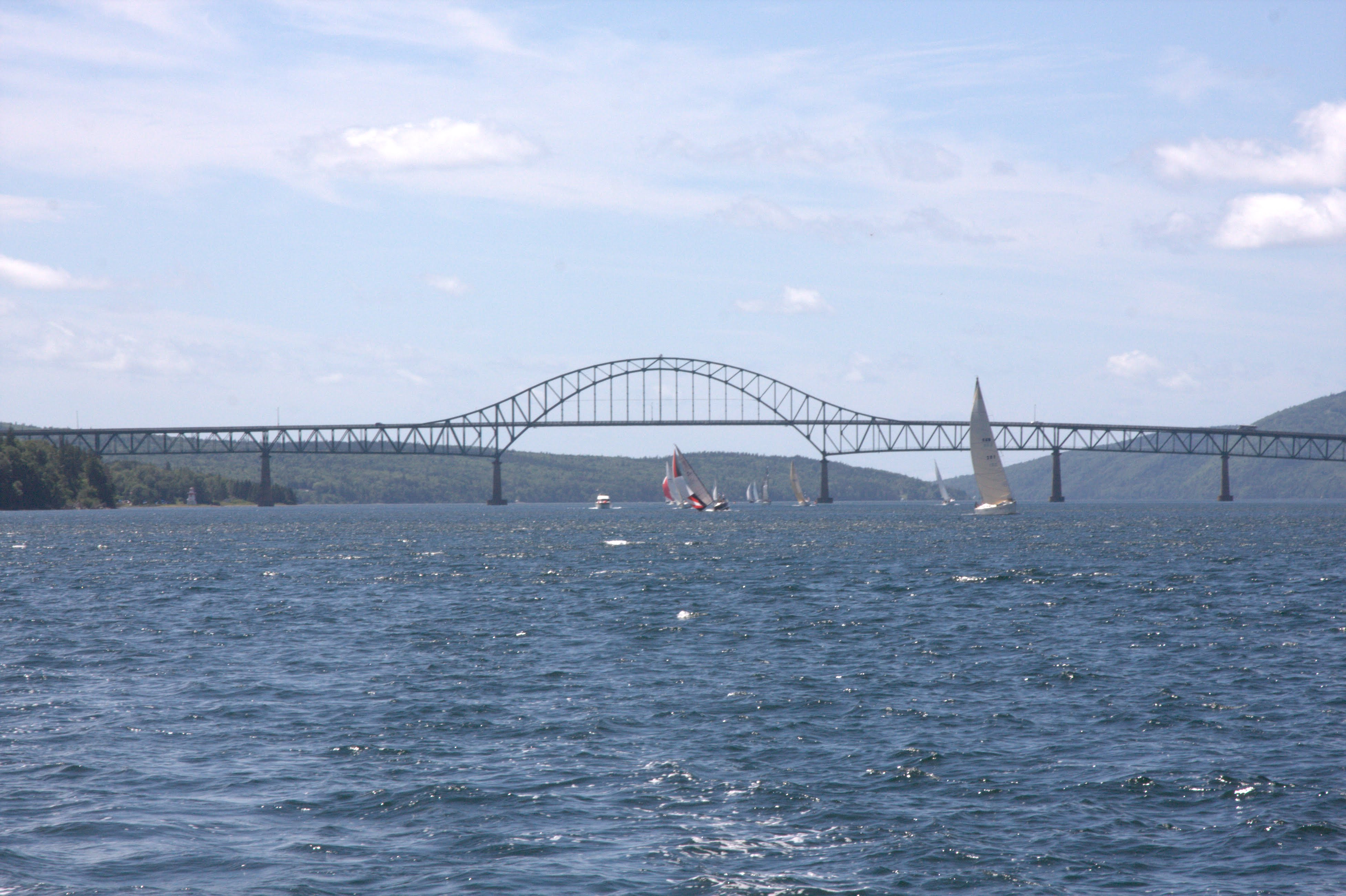
The Seal Island Bridge during Race the Cape in 2013

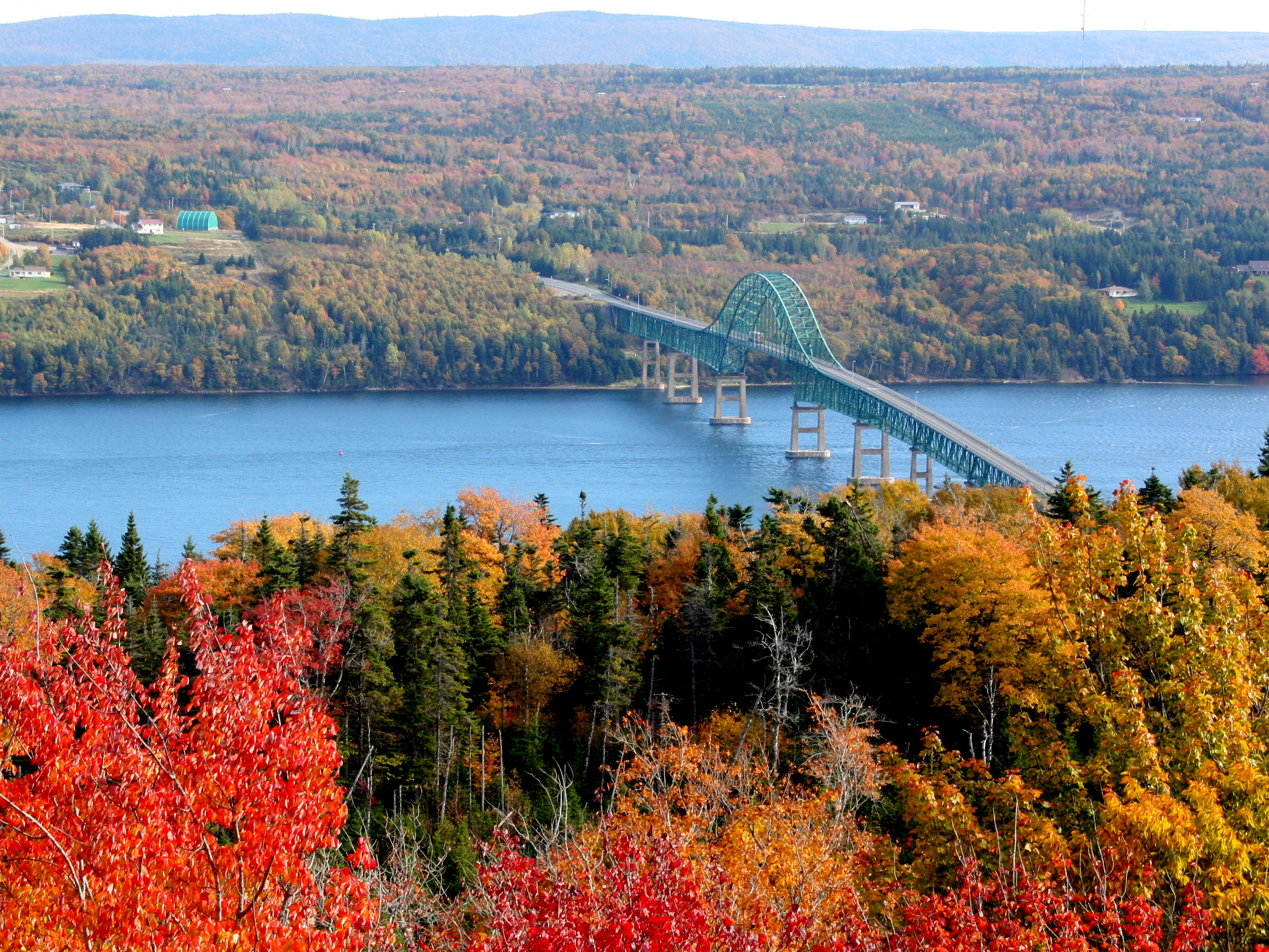
The Seal Island Bridge, viewed from the Bras d'Or look off on Kelly's Mountain

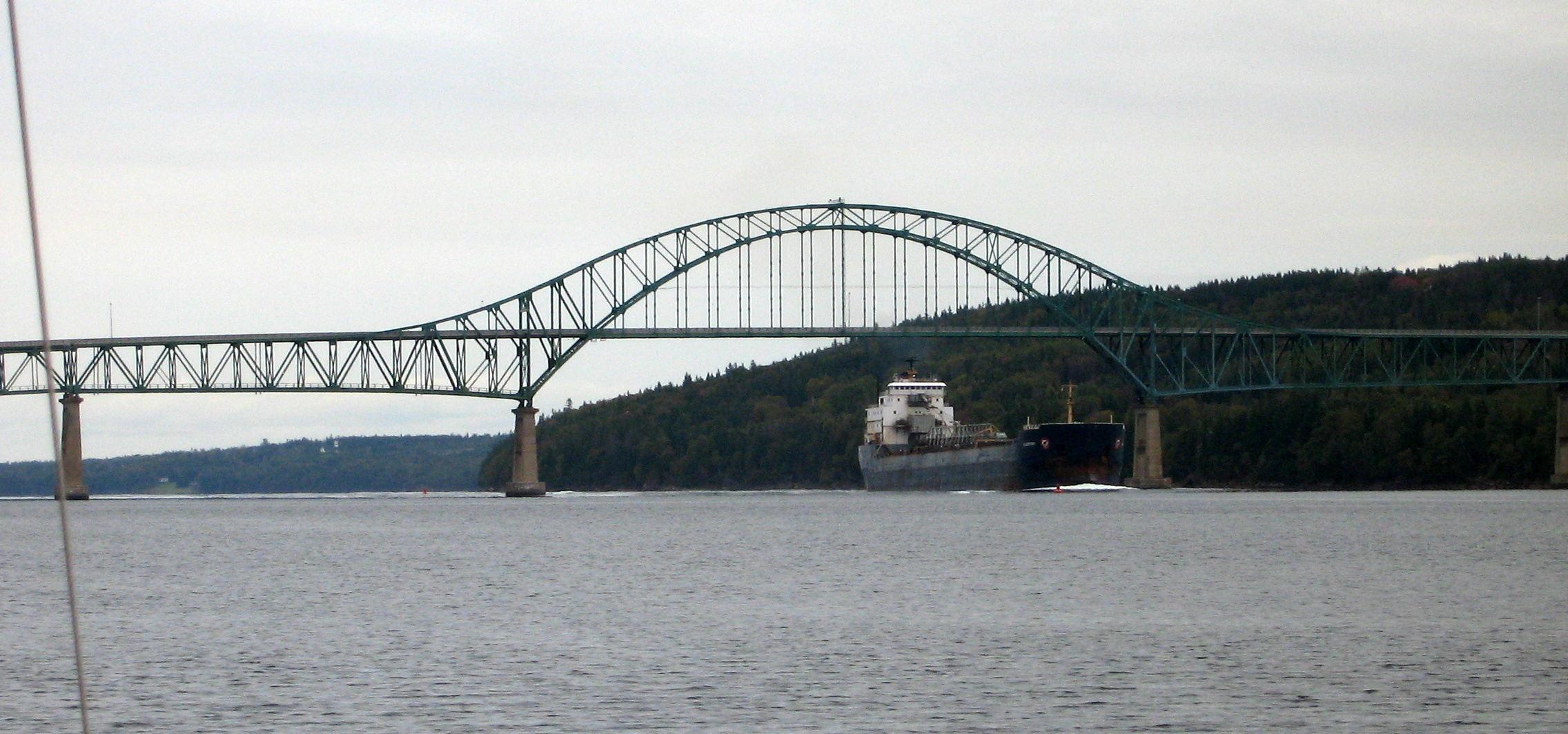
The MV Algoport passing under the Seal Island Bridge

== See also ==
- List of bridges in Canada
