= Boularderie Island =

Island off of Cape Breton Island, Nova Scotia, Canada

Coordinates: 46°13′N 60°27′W

Boularderie Island (pronounced "bull-uhr-dree") is an island separating the Cabot Strait from Bras d'Or Lake on the eastern coast of Cape Breton Island, Nova Scotia, Canada. It takes its name from Louis-Simon le Poupet de la Boularderie, who was granted the area as a concession from the King of France.

== Geography ==
At 40 km (25 mi) long and between 3 km (2 mi) to 10 km (6 mi) wide, Boularderie Island is Nova Scotia's second largest island after Cape Breton Island.

Two outlets of Bras d'Or Lake run on each side of the island to the Atlantic Ocean:

- the Great Bras d'Or channel runs along the island's northwestern shore, and
- St. Andrews Channel and the Little Bras d'Or channel run along the island's southeastern shore.

The extreme northeastern end of the island at Point Aconi fronts the Cabot Strait, whereas the extreme southwestern end at Kempt Head fronts the northern basin of Bras d'Or Lake.

The majority of the island is heavily forested, however, there are a small number of farms along the southern and eastern shores.

The northern end of the island in the community of Point Aconi has been home to several underground coal mines with the last one, the Prince Colliery, closing in November 2001. There have also been several controversial proposals to strip mine near-surface deposits which is meeting significant opposition from residents in the northern end of Boularderie Island. The Point Aconi Generating Station is located at the northern end of the island adjacent to the abandoned Prince Colliery brown field.

The island is divided across two of the province's counties with the north and western side being part of Victoria County (approximately 2/3 of the island's land mass), and the remainder of the more populated northeastern end being part of Cape Breton County.

== Communities ==
The following communities are located on Boularderie Island:

Within Cape Breton County:

- Bras d'Or (The western portion of this community straddles the Little Bras d'Or Channel onto Boularderie Island.)
- Dalem Lake
- Groves Point
- Hillside Boularderie
- Mill Creek
- Mill Pond
- Millville (Also known as "Millville Boularderie".)
- New Dominion
- Point Aconi (This community also includes the place name "McCreadyville".)
- Southside Boularderie (Not to be confused with the adjacent "Southside of Boularderie" in Victoria County. This community also includes the place names "Black Brook" and "Boularderie West")

Within Victoria County:

- Big Bras d'Or
- Black Rock
- Boularderie Centre (This community also includes the place names "Boularderie" and "Big Bank".)
- Boularderie East
- Kempt Head
- Ross Ferry
- South Side of Boularderie (Not to be confused with the adjacent "Southside Boularderie" in Cape Breton County. This community also includes the place name "Island Point".)
- Upper Kempt Head

== Roads ==
The island is encircled by local roads, however, there are only two numbered highways:

- Highway 105, also signed for the Trans-Canada Highway, traverses the island diagonally from the Seal Island Bridge at Boularderie East in the west through to the Little Bras d'Or Bridge at Bras d'Or in the east. It was constructed in the early 1960s.
- Highway 162, also signed as the Prince Mine Rd, runs from Highway 105 at Bras d'Or to the Point Aconi Generating Station at Point Aconi. It was constructed in the 1970s to serve the Prince Colliery.
