= Kellys Mountain =

Mountain in Nova Scotia, Canada

- Mi'kmawi'simk: Mukla'qatik
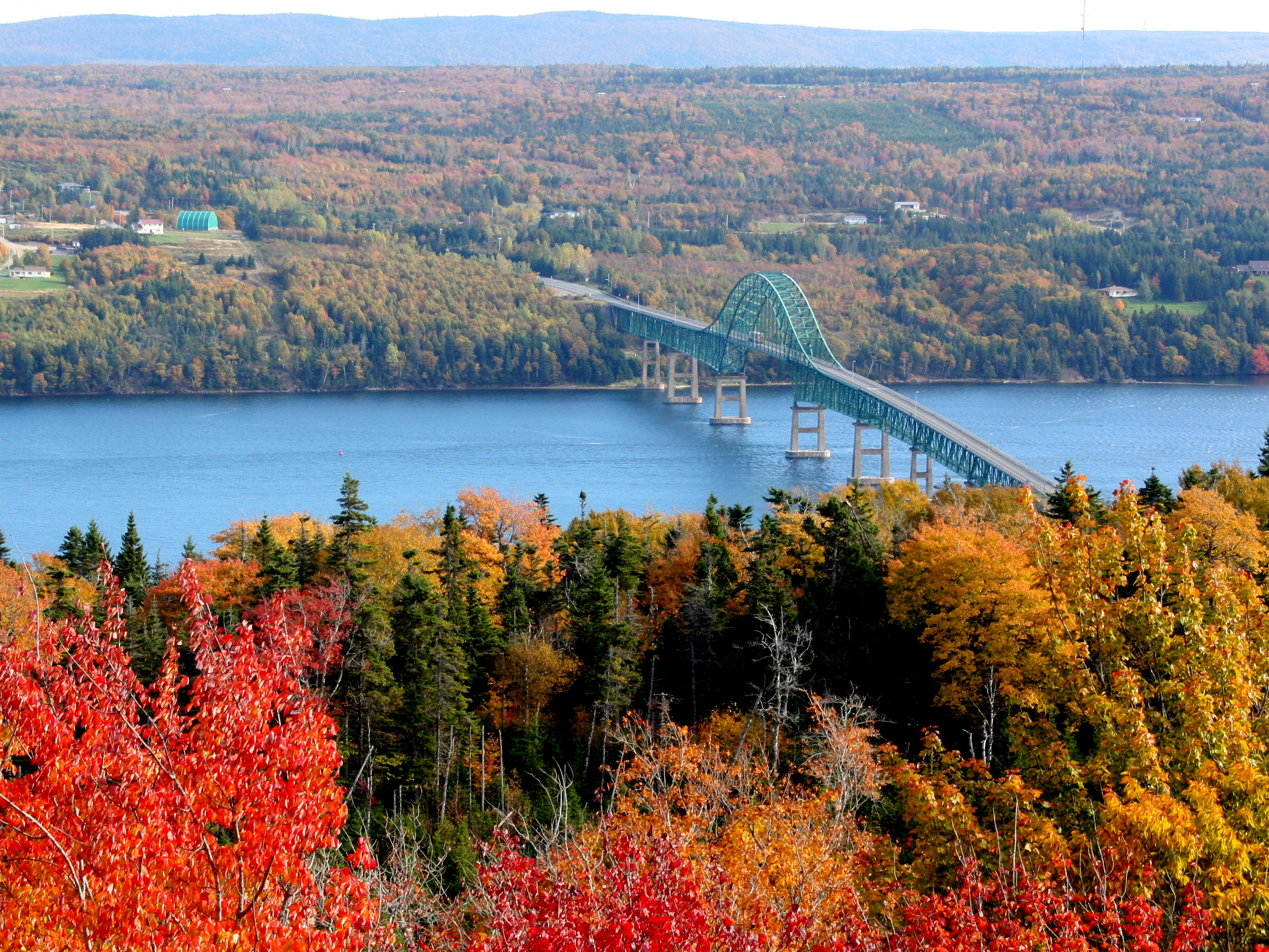
- The view from the Bras d'Or Look-off on Kellys Mountain

Highest point
- Elevation: 267 m (876 ft)
- Coordinates: 46°15′24″N 60°30′55″W

Geography
- Location within Nova Scotia
- Location: Cape Breton Island, Nova Scotia, Canada
- Topo map: NTS 11K7 St. Ann's Harbour

Climbing
- Access: road / hike

Kellys Mountain (Mi'kmawi'simk: Mukla'qatik) is a mountain located in Victoria County, Nova Scotia, Canada. The Trans-Canada Highway winds its way up the mountain via Route 105. It is known for both its scenic view from the top and its steep slope on both sides of the mountain highway. There is a parking space at the top known as the Bras d'Or Look Off that gives a view of Seal Island Bridge, Great Bras d'Or channel and Boularderie Island, areas where the highway travels after the driver descends the eastern portion of the Highway. Travellers should be aware of a sharp hairpin turn at the foot of the eastern end of the mountain that switches back greater than 180 degrees after a steep descent.

The area around Kellys Mountain is rich in Scottish history. The Gaelic College of Arts and Crafts is located in Saint Anns at the western end where the climb up the mountain begins.

In 2023, the Union of Nova Scotia Mi'kmaq petitioned to restore the original name of Kellys Mountain, Mukla'qati, meaning 'place where the geese land'.
