= Nova Scotia Route 312 =

Highway in Nova Scotia, Canada

Route 312

Route information
- Maintained by Nova Scotia Department of Transportation and Infrastructure Renewal
- Length: 13 km (8.1 mi)

Major junctions
- South end: Hwy 105 (TCH) in South Haven
- North end: Trunk 30 in River Bennet

Location
- Country: Canada
- Province: Nova Scotia
- Counties: Victoria

Highway system
- Provincial highways in Nova Scotia; 100-series
← Route 311	→ Route 316

Route 312 is a collector road in the Canadian province of Nova Scotia.

It is located in Victoria County and connects Englishtown at Highway 105 with River Bennet at Trunk 30 (the Cabot Trail).

== Communities ==
- South Haven
- Englishtown
- Jersey Cove
- River Bennett

== See also ==
- List of Nova Scotia provincial highways
