= Cabot Trail =

Scenic highway on Cape Breton Island in Nova Scotia, Canada

Coordinates: 46°29′13″N 60°44′46″W

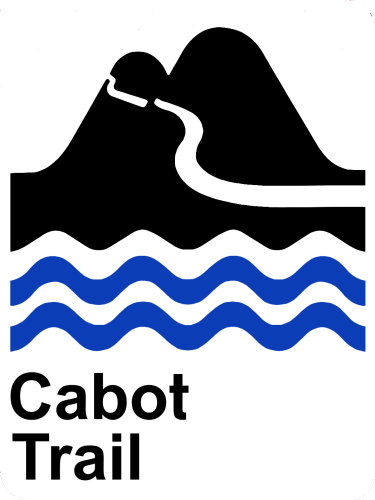
Cabot Trail
- Trunk 30

Route information
- Length: 298 km (185 mi)

Major junctions
- East end: Hwy 105 (TCH) at Buckwheat Corner
- Route 312 in River Bennet; Route 219 in Margaree Harbour; Trunk 19 in Margaree Forks
- West end: Hwy 105 (TCH) at South Haven

Location
- Country: Canada
- Province: Nova Scotia
- Counties: Victoria County, Inverness County

Highway system
- Provincial highways in Nova Scotia; 100-series
← Trunk 28	→ Trunk 32

The Cabot Trail is a scenic highway on Cape Breton Island in Nova Scotia, Canada. It is a 298 km (185 mi) loop around the northern tip of the island, passing along and through the Cape Breton Highlands and the Cape Breton Highlands National Park.

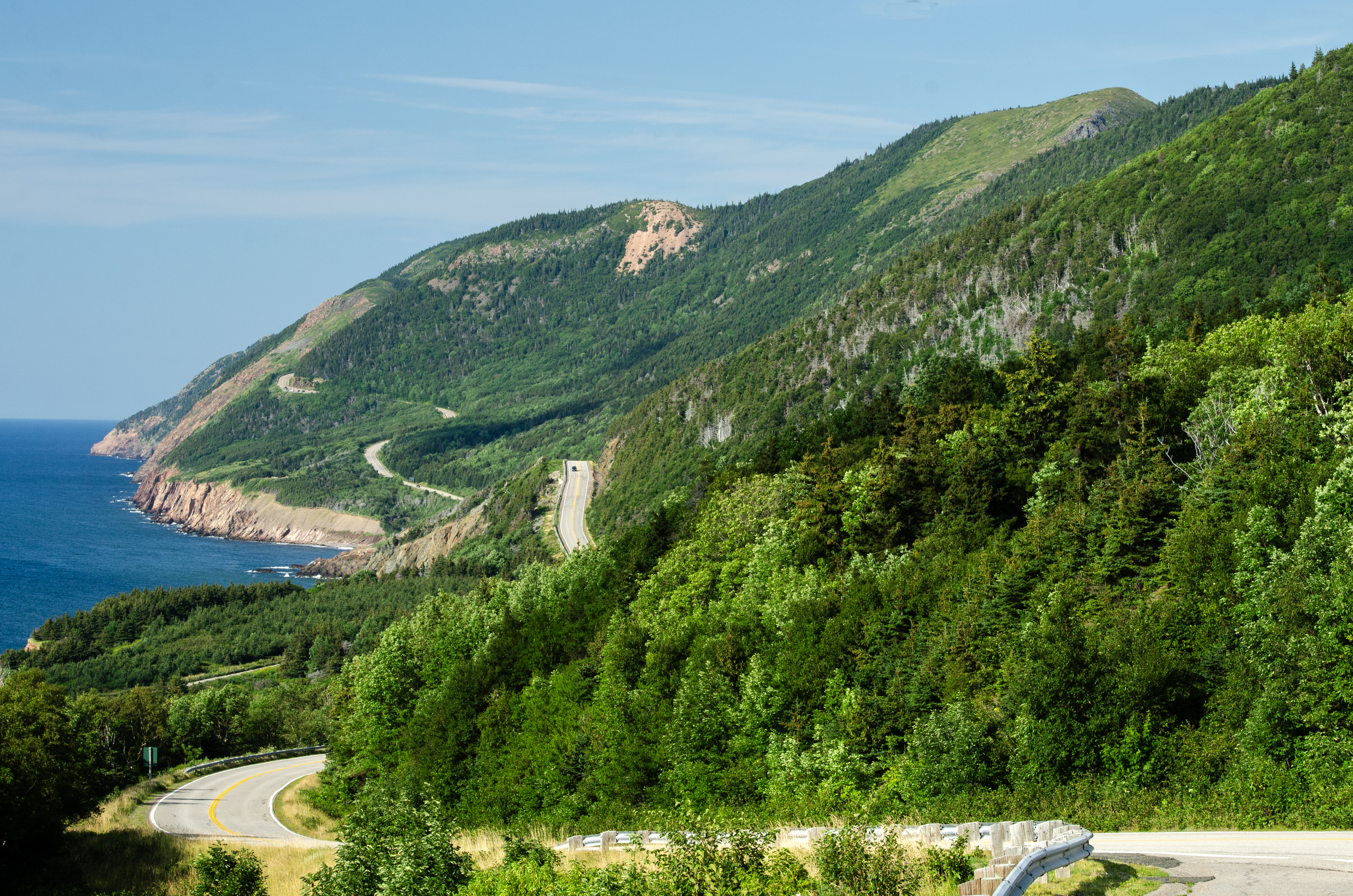
The Cabot Trail winding through the Cape Breton Highlands along the western coast of Cape Breton Island, Nova Scotia, Canada. The scenic highway follows steep coastal mountains overlooking the Gulf of St. Lawrence.

It is named after the explorer John Cabot who landed in Atlantic Canada in 1497, although modern historians agree his landfall likely took place in Newfoundland and not Cape Breton Island. Premier Angus L. MacDonald wanted to re-brand Nova Scotia for tourism purposes as primarily Scottish and, as part of this effort, created both the names Cape Breton Highlands and Cabot Trail. Construction of the initial route was completed in 1932.

The western and eastern sections follow the rugged coastline, with views of the ocean. The southwestern section passes through the Margaree River valley before passing along Bras d'Or Lake. The route is within the county municipalities of Victoria and Inverness.

The northern section of The Cabot Trail goes through the Cape Breton Highlands and is considered one of the most scenic areas of Nova Scotia. The Skyline Trail is one of the most famous attractions on the island and is located at a parking lot on the side of the road inside Cape Breton Highlands National Park.

The Cabot Trail includes all of Trunk 30, as well as the portion of Nova Scotia Highway 105 between exits 7 and 11. Following are some stops along the route, travelling clockwise from the south:

- Baddeck, the location of the Alexander Graham Bell National Historic Site.
- Chéticamp, an Acadian fishing village.
- Pleasant Bay, site of a bay with whale watching possibilities.
- Cape North, a headland at the northernmost point of the Cabot Trail.
- Dingwall, a small fishing village.
- Ingonish, site of the Keltic Lodge resort and Cape Smokey Provincial Park.
- St. Anns, home of the Gaelic College of Celtic Arts and Crafts.

== See also ==
- List of Nova Scotia provincial highways

== Gallery ==
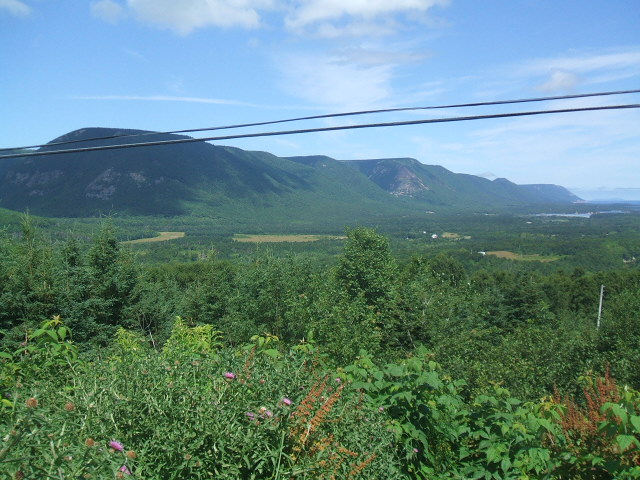
Sunrise Valley, Cape North

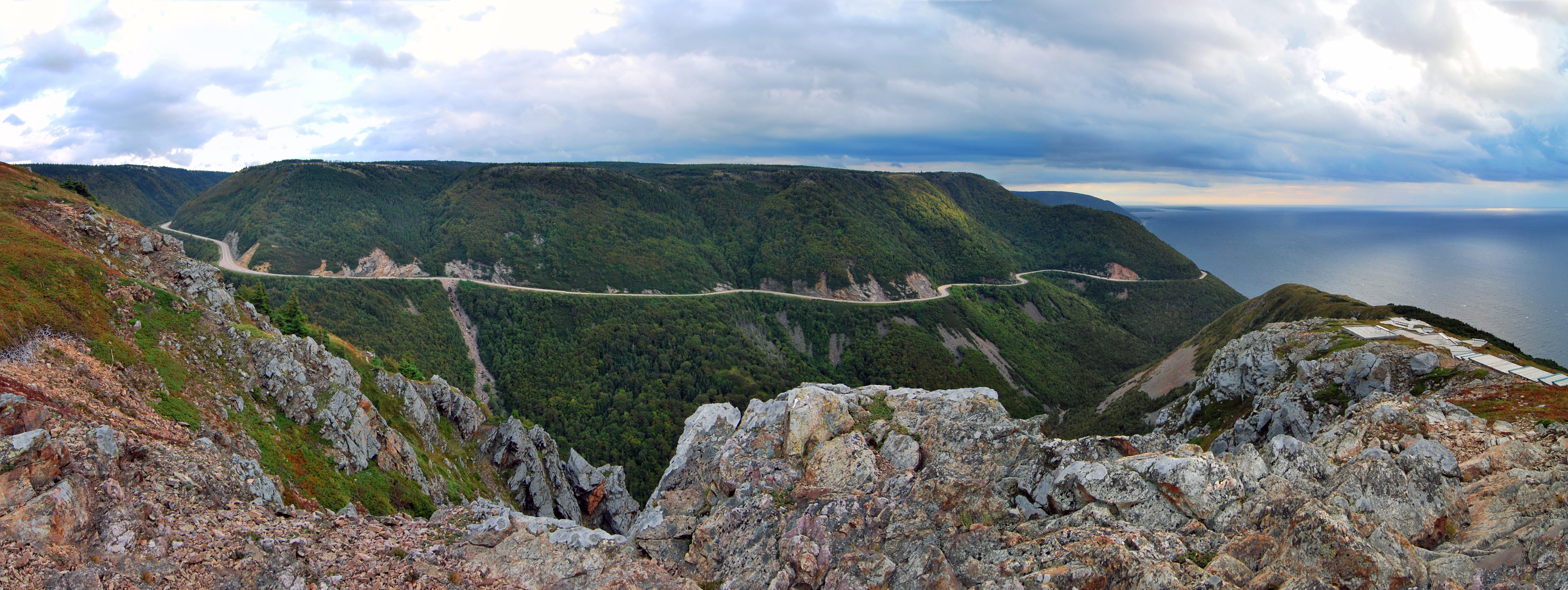
The Cabot Trail viewed from the Skyline Trail

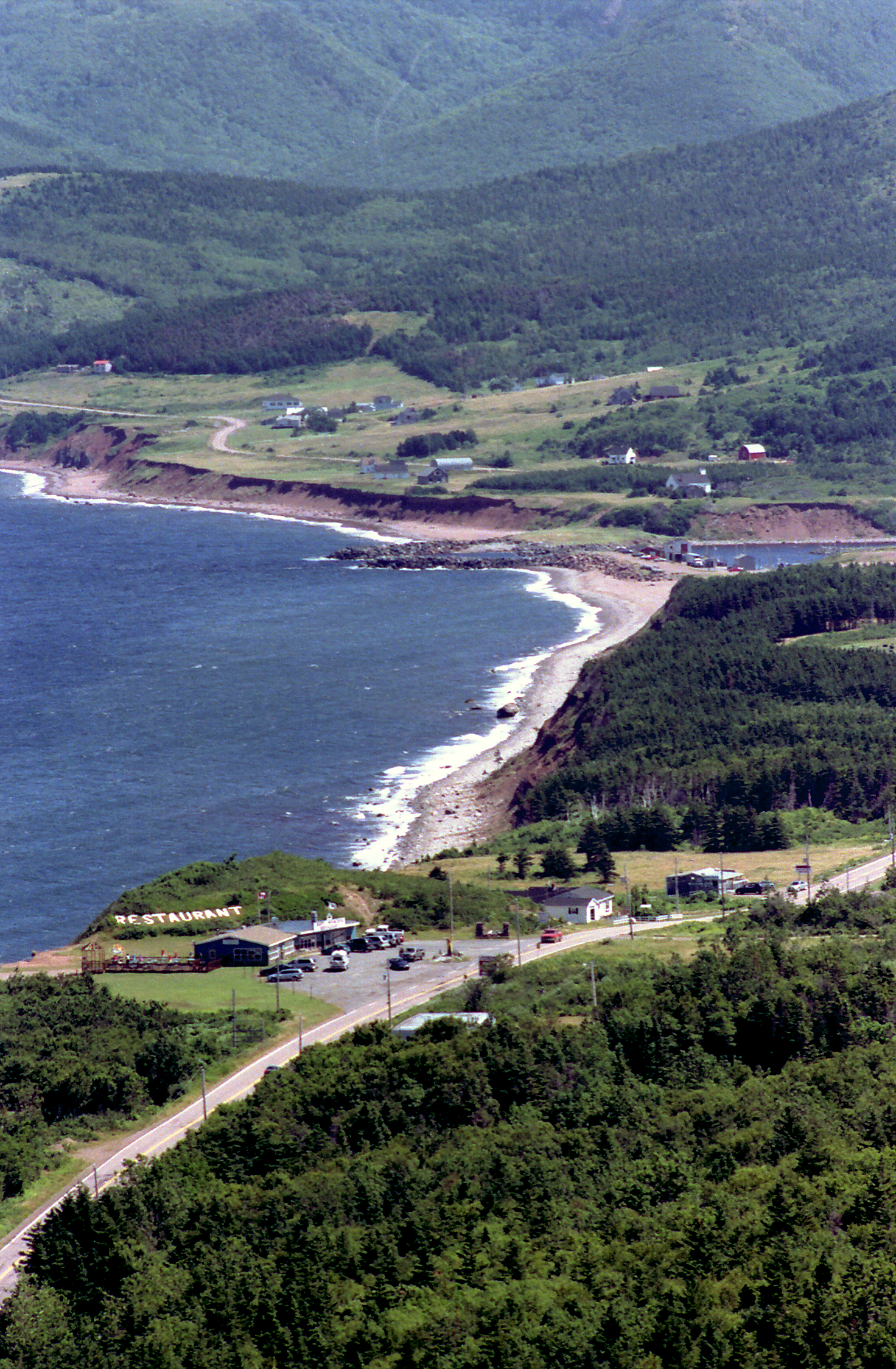
Pleasant Bay
