= Estmere, Nova Scotia =

Community in Nova Scotia, Canada

Coordinates: 45°55′42″N 60°58′32″W

Estmere in Nova Scotia

Estmere is a small community in the Canadian province of Nova Scotia, located in Victoria County on Cape Breton Island. It was named by an Act of Parliament in the year 1887; "mere" is a rare word meaning "a pond, pool or lakelet", and also an old Scottish word for the sea.
