= Nova Scotia Route 205 =

Highway in Nova Scotia, Canada

Route 205

Route information
- Maintained by Nova Scotia Department of Transportation and Infrastructure Renewal
- Length: 9 km (5.6 mi)

Major junctions
- West end: Hwy 105 (TCH) in Baddeck
- East end: Hwy 105 (TCH) in MacAulays Hill

Location
- Country: Canada
- Province: Nova Scotia

Highway system
- Provincial highways in Nova Scotia; 100-series
← Route 204	→ Route 206

Route 205 is a collector road in the Canadian province of Nova Scotia.

It is located in Victoria County on Cape Breton Island and runs between Baddeck and MacAulays Hill connecting at both ends with Highway 105. It was originally known as Trunk 5 until 1970.

== Communities ==
- Baddeck
- Crescent Cove
- Baddeck Bay
- MacAulays Hill

== See also ==
- List of Nova Scotia provincial highways
