= McKinnons Harbour, Nova Scotia =

Community in Nova Scotia, Canada

Coordinates: 45°56′29.33″N 60°53′34.22″W

McKinnons Harbour in Nova Scotia

McKinnons Harbour is a small community in the Canadian province of Nova Scotia, located in Victoria County on Cape Breton Island. The area is named after a family of settlers. The Mi'kmaq name was "Amasiboogwek," meaning "a grand river."
