= Nova Scotia Highway 162 =

Highway in Nova Scotia, Canada

Highway 162

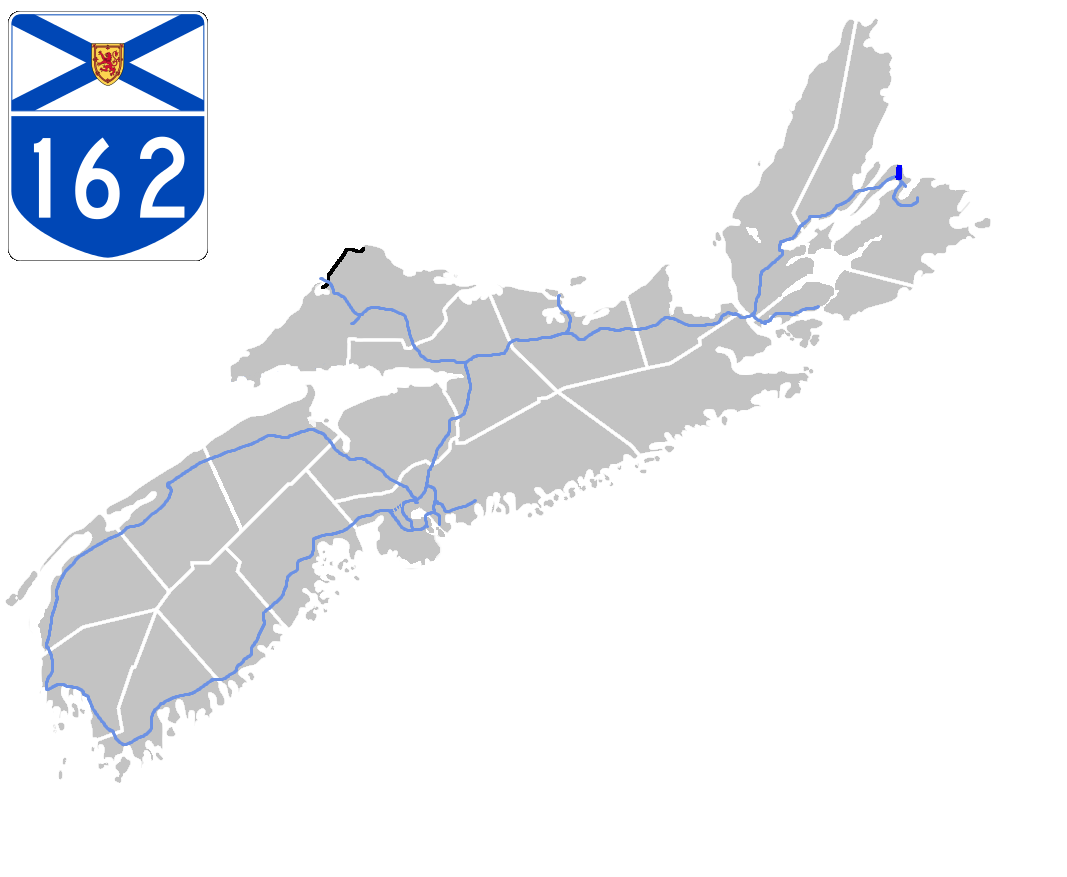

Route information
- Maintained by Nova Scotia Department of Transportation and Infrastructure Renewal
- Length: 8.39 km (5.21 mi)
- Existed: 1978–present

Major junctions
- South end: Hwy 105 (TCH) near Bras d'Or
- North end: Point Aconi

Location
- Country: Canada
- Province: Nova Scotia

Highway system
- Provincial highways in Nova Scotia; 100-series
← Hwy 142	→ Route 201

Highway 162 is a two-lane controlled access highway on Boularderie Island in Nova Scotia, Canada.

Highway 162 was constructed in the late 1970s to link Highway 105 in Bras d'Or to the now-closed Prince Mine at Point Aconi. In the early 1990s the highway was extended another 2 kilometres to terminate at the Point Aconi Generating Station. The highway is 8 kilometres (5 mi) long, there is one intersection on the highway near the old Prince Mine site that connects to Point Aconi Road.

== Major intersections ==
The entire route is located in Cape Breton Regional Municipality.

Location	km	mi	Destinations	Notes
Bras d'Or	0.0	0.0	Hwy 105 (TCH) – North Sydney, Newfoundland Ferry, Canso Causeway	Southern terminus; at-grade; Hwy 105 exit 17
	7.3	4.5	Prince Mine Road	
Point Aconi	8.4	5.2	Point Aconi Road	Northern terminus
1.000 mi = 1.609 km; 1.000 km = 0.621 mi
