= North River Bridge =

Community in Nova Scotia, Canada

Coordinates: 46°18′30.68″N 60°37′13.8″W

North River Bridge in Nova Scotia

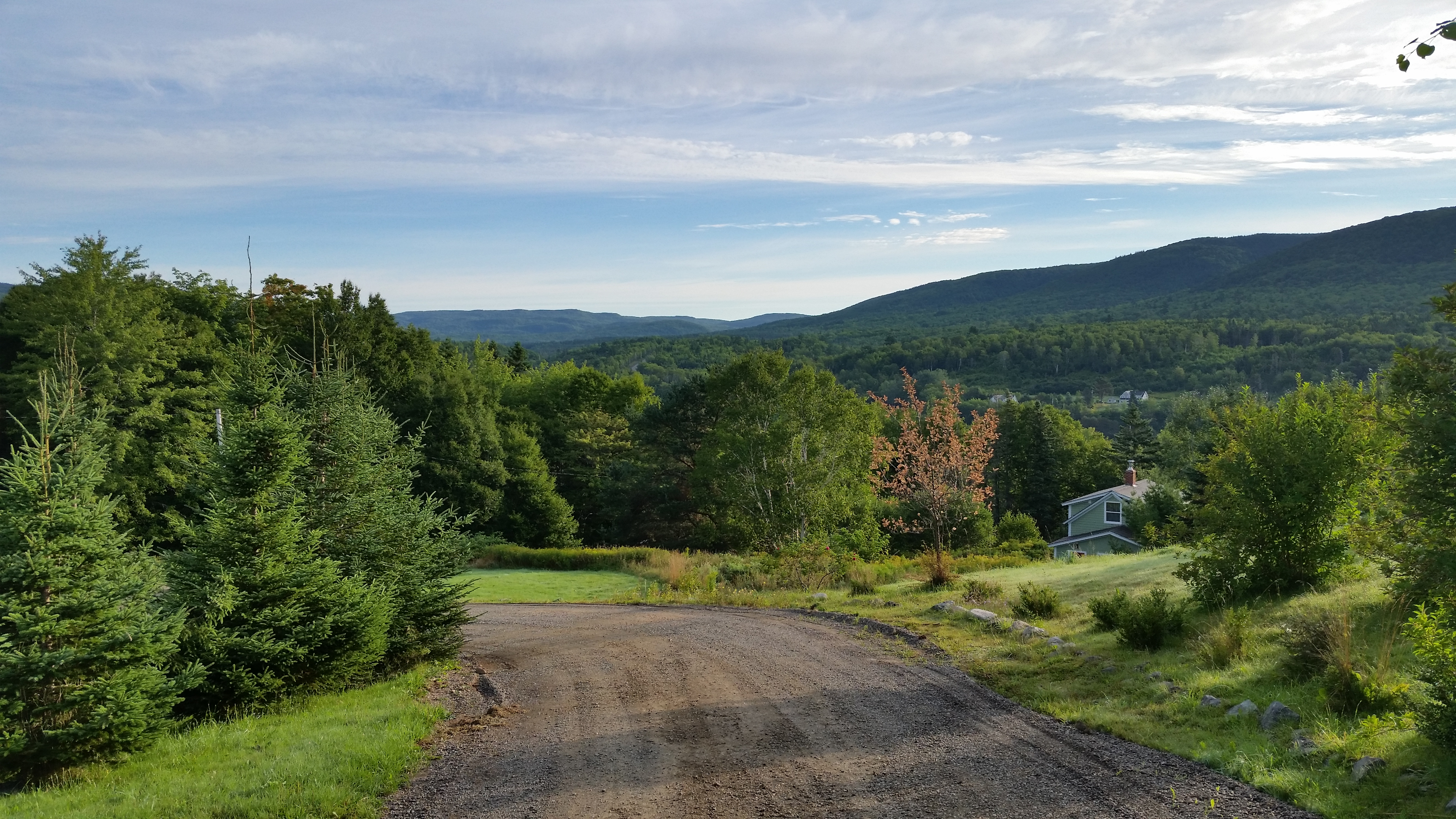
North River Bridge, Nova Scotia, looking north

North River Bridge is a small community in the Canadian province of Nova Scotia, located in Victoria County on Cape Breton Island.
