= Tarbotvale =

Community in Nova Scotia, Canada

Coordinates: 46°21′1.31″N 60°34′23.85″W

Tarbotvale in Nova Scotia

Tarbotvale is a small community in the Canadian province of Nova Scotia, located in Victoria County on Cape Breton Island.

Named after "Tarbot" in the sub-division of Harris in the Hebrides, Scotland; suggested, no doubt, by descendants of emigrants from these parts. The Scottish spelling is "Tarbert."
