= 100-series highways =

100-series highways may refer to:

- 100-series highways (Nova Scotia)
- Primary highways in Quebec
