= Hillside Boularderie =

Community in Nova Scotia, Canada

Coordinates: 46°14′8.61″N 60°23′18.59″W

Hillside Boularderie in Nova Scotia

Hillside Boularderie is a community in the Canadian province of Nova Scotia, located in the Cape Breton Regional Municipality on Cape Breton Island. It takes its name from Louis-Simon le Poupet de la Boularderie, who was granted the area as a concession from the King of France.
