= Bucklaw, Nova Scotia =

Community in Nova Scotia, Canada

Coordinates: 46°1′2″N 60°59′2″W

Bucklaw in Nova Scotia

Bucklaw is a small community in the Canadian province of Nova Scotia, located in Victoria County on Cape Breton Island. Early settlers in Bucklaw included Neil McIvor, who received a land grant in 1835, and Donald McIvor, who received a land grant in 1871.

The presence of salt springs in Bucklaw led to an attempt at salt mining in 1922.

There is a castle in Bucklaw which sold for an undisclosed sum in 2018, and was sold again for CA$1 million in 2024.
