= New Campbellton =

Community in Nova Scotia, Canada

Coordinates: 46°17′0.58″N 60°24′58.4″W

New Campbellton in Nova Scotia

New Campbellton is a small community in the Canadian province of Nova Scotia, located in Victoria County on Cape Breton Island.

This name was suggested to the residents because a Mr. Charles Campbell was a very influential resident here, and a parliamentary representative at one time.

The place was previously known as "Kelly Cove" or "Kelly's Cove"; it received its present name in 1862.
