= Dalem Lake, Nova Scotia =

Community in Canada

Coordinates: 46°14′46.18″N 60°25′55.96″W

Dalem Lake in Nova Scotia

Dalem Lake (2001 pop. 78) is a community in the Canadian province of Nova Scotia, located in Cape Breton Regional Municipality.

It is located on Boularderie Island and is the location of Dalem Lake Provincial Park.
