= Big Harbour, Nova Scotia =

Community in Nova Scotia, Canada

Coordinates: 46°8′47.54″N 60°36′12″W

Big Harbour in Nova Scotia

Big Harbour is a small community in the Canadian province of Nova Scotia, located in Victoria County on Cape Breton Island.
