= Nova Scotia Highway 142 =

Highway in Nova Scotia, Canada

Highway 142

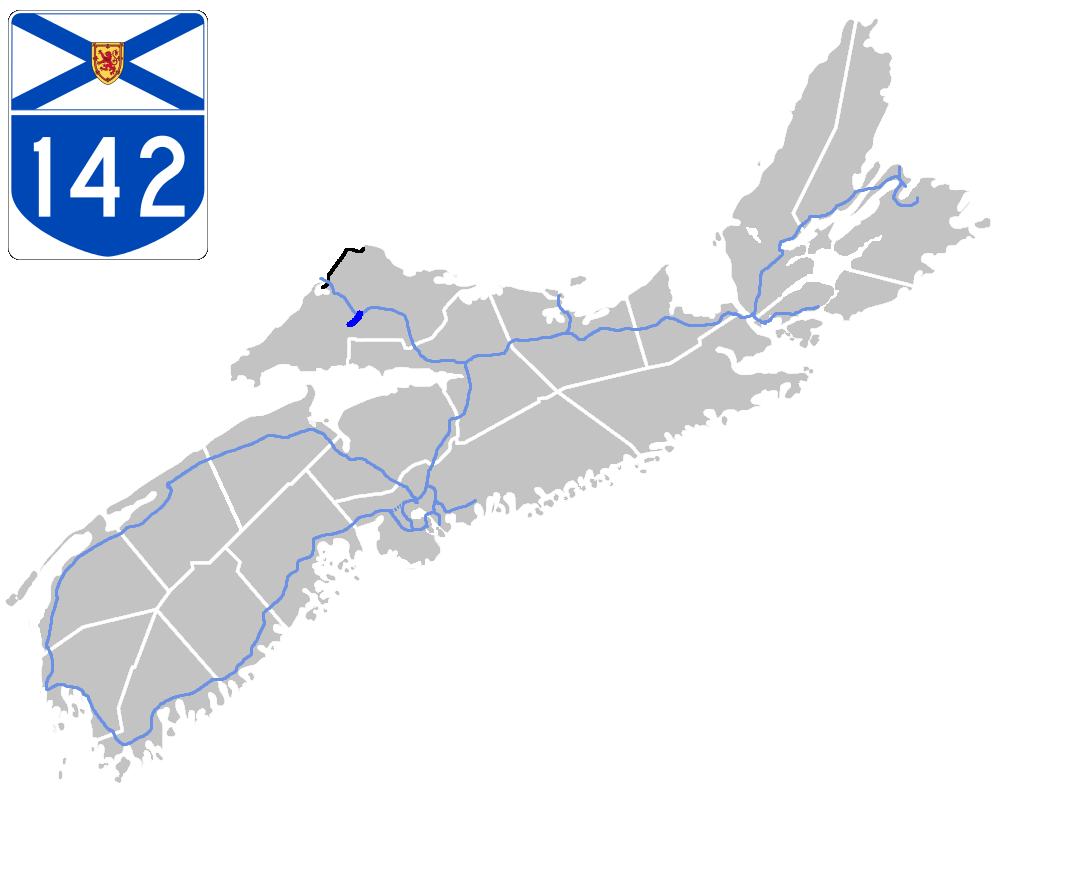

Route information
- Maintained by Nova Scotia Department of Transportation and Infrastructure Renewal
- Length: 6.1 km (3.8 mi)
- Existed: 1970–present

Major junctions
- South end: Trunk 2 in Springhill
- North end: Hwy 104 (TCH) near Springhill

Location
- Country: Canada
- Province: Nova Scotia

Highway system
- Provincial highways in Nova Scotia; 100-series
← Hwy 125	→ Hwy 162

Highway 142 is a 2-lane limited-access road in Cumberland County, Nova Scotia, Canada. It links Highway 104 at Exit 5 in Salt Springs Station to the town of Springhill. The 6-kilometre (4 mi) highway crosses the Canadian National Railway main line about 4.5 kilometres (2.8 mi) outside Springhill. There are several logging roads that have access onto the highway.

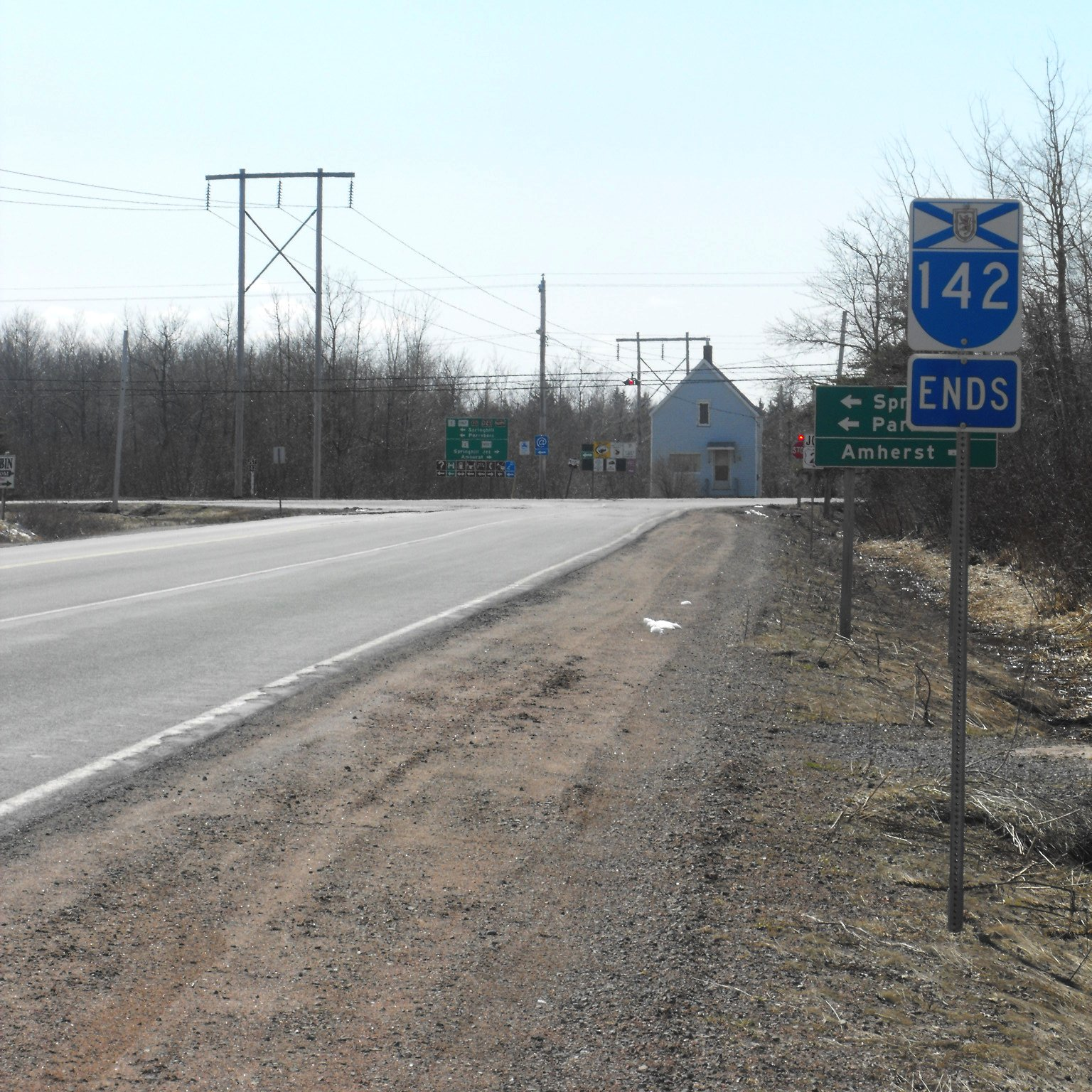
Nova Scotia Route 142 near its terminus in Springhill, Nova Scotia.

== History ==
The highway was built in the late 1960s as part of a political promise to Springhill residents who were upset that their town was bypassed by the new Trans-Canada Highway alignment on Highway 104; this being less than a decade after the town's economy had been hit by the Springhill Mining Disaster of 1958 which resulted in the closure of local coal mining.

== Major intersections ==
The entire route is in Cumberland County.

Location	km	mi	Destinations	Notes
Springhill	0.0	0.0	Trunk 2 to Route 321 – Springhill, Parrsboro, Springhill Junction, Amherst	
	6.1	3.8	Hwy 104 (TCH) – Truro, Halifax, Amherst, New Brunswick	Exit 5 on Hwy 104
1.000 mi = 1.609 km; 1.000 km = 0.621 mi
