= Pleasant Bay, Nova Scotia =

Community in Nova Scotia, Canada

Coordinates: 46°49′15″N 60°48′57″W

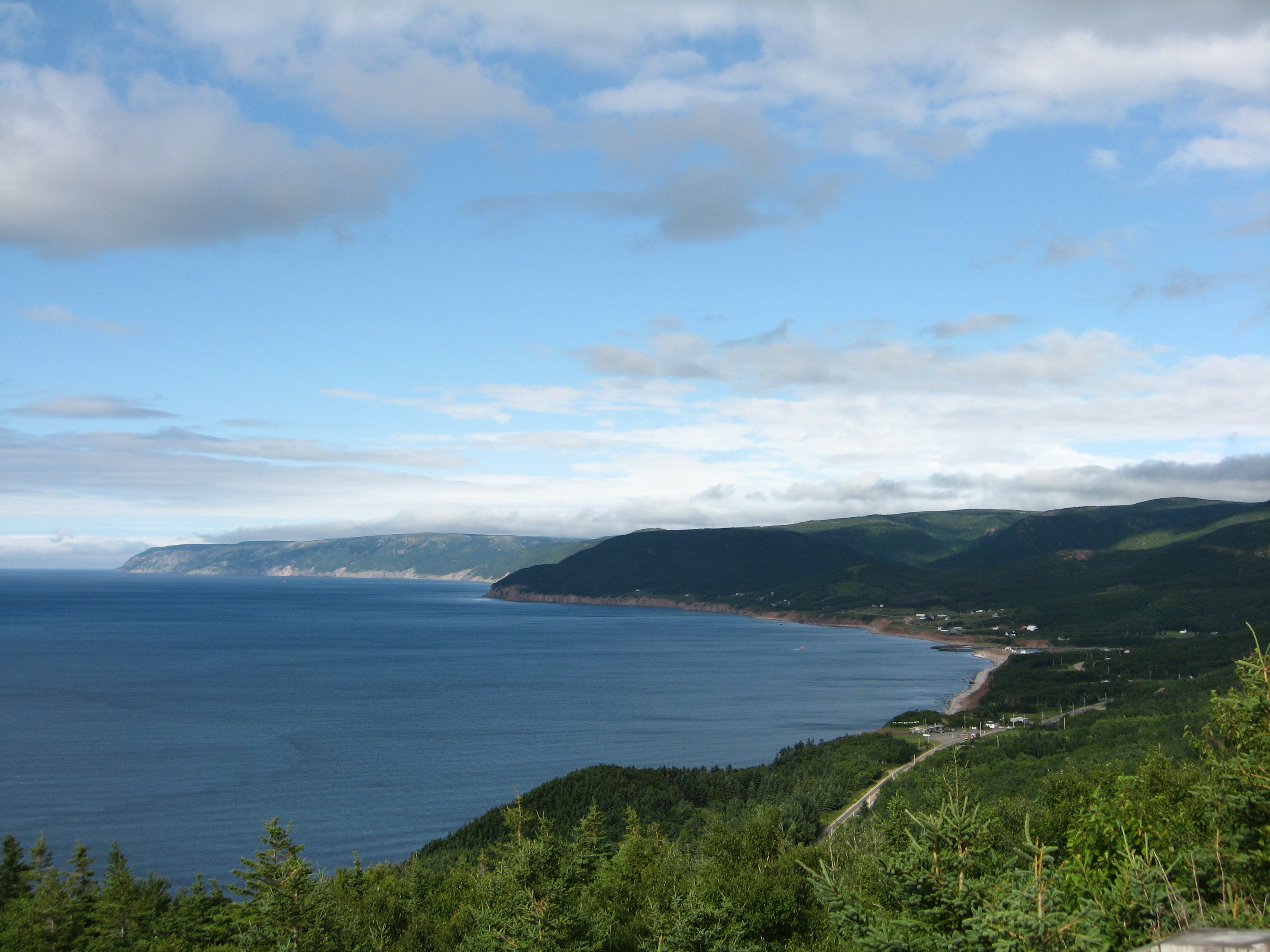
Pleasant Bay seen from the Cabot Trail.

Pleasant Bay (Scottish Gaelic: Am Bàgh Toilichte) is a community on the western coast of Cape Breton Island, on the shore of the Gulf of St. Lawrence in Inverness County, Nova Scotia. The community is located on the Cabot Trail, 141 kilometres (88 mi) from Port Hawkesbury. The federal electoral riding is Sydney—Victoria. Pleasant Bay is known as the whale watching capital of Cape Breton and marks the centre of the Cabot trail.

The main industry here is fishing, lobster in spring and snowcrab in the summer. The forest here is home to a variety of birds, fox, coyote, and snowshoe hare. The area is visited by whale watchers from all over the world.

Pleasant Bay in Nova Scotia

== Communications ==
- The Postal Code is B0E 2P0
- The Telephone exchange is 902-224

== Demographics ==
- Total Population 258
- Total Dwellings 133
- Total Land Area 636.628 km^{2}

== Climate ==
Climate data for Pleasant Bay
Month	Jan	Feb	Mar	Apr	May	Jun	Jul	Aug	Sep	Oct	Nov	Dec	Year
Record high °C (°F)	18 (64)	16.1 (61.0)	19.4 (66.9)	23.9 (75.0)	30 (86)	32.5 (90.5)	34.4 (93.9)	32.8 (91.0)	31.1 (88.0)	25 (77)	25.6 (78.1)	18.3 (64.9)	34.4 (93.9)
Mean daily maximum °C (°F)	−1.2 (29.8)	−2 (28)	2 (36)	6.8 (44.2)	13.7 (56.7)	19.3 (66.7)	22.9 (73.2)	22.4 (72.3)	17.7 (63.9)	12.1 (53.8)	7 (45)	1.7 (35.1)	10.2 (50.4)
Mean daily minimum °C (°F)	−9.4 (15.1)	−11 (12)	−6.8 (19.8)	−1.6 (29.1)	3.2 (37.8)	8.9 (48.0)	13.3 (55.9)	13.1 (55.6)	8.6 (47.5)	4.2 (39.6)	0.4 (32.7)	−5.3 (22.5)	1.5 (34.7)
Record low °C (°F)	−28 (−18)	−29 (−20)	−24 (−11)	−14.4 (6.1)	−8 (18)	−2.2 (28.0)	2.8 (37.0)	2 (36)	−1.7 (28.9)	−3.9 (25.0)	−9 (16)	−18 (0)	−29 (−20)
Average precipitation mm (inches)	163.7 (6.44)	109.4 (4.31)	118.2 (4.65)	102.9 (4.05)	83.3 (3.28)	87 (3.4)	83.5 (3.29)	102.3 (4.03)	121.3 (4.78)	157.8 (6.21)	157.8 (6.21)	162.9 (6.41)	1,450.1 (57.09)
Source: Environment Canada
