= Jersey Cove, Nova Scotia =

Community in Nova Scotia, Canada

Coordinates: 46°18′31.96″N 60°32′42.5″W

Jersey Cove in Nova Scotia

Jersey Cove is a small community in the Canadian province of Nova Scotia, located in Victoria County on Cape Breton Island.
