= Louis-Simon le Poupet de la Boularderie =

Louis-Simon le Poupet de la Boularderie (c. 1674 – 6 June 1738) was a French-born naval officer who was important in Canadian history for various roles he took on in the New World.

Louis-Simon's family came to Canada and he entered the regular colonial troops in 1693. He served as an ensign and, subsequently, as a lieutenant to Governor Pastour de Costebelle at Plaisance, Newfoundland. He was involved in the Avalon Peninsula Campaign in 1696–97 under the command of Pierre Le Moyne d'Iberville.

Boularderie is most often remembered for his colonization and development efforts, most particularly at his concession along La Petite Brador.

Boularderie was designated a Canadian National Historic Person by the Historic Sites and Monuments Board of Canada in October 1964.

== Legacy ==
Namesake of Boularderie Island in Nova Scotia, Canada.
