= Black Rock, Victoria County =

Community in Nova Scotia, Canada

Coordinates: 46°18′54.58″N 60°22′5.36″W

Black Rock in Nova Scotia

Black Rock is a community in the Canadian province of Nova Scotia, located in Victoria County.

== Notable people ==
- A.A. MacLeod (1902 – 1970), political organizer and MPP
