= Iron Mines, Nova Scotia =

Community in Nova Scotia, Canada

Coordinates: 45°56′28.04″N 61°9′5.83″W

Iron Mines in Nova Scotia

Iron Mines is a small community in the Canadian province of Nova Scotia, located in Inverness County on Cape Breton Island. The community had a population of 200 people in 1904.
