= Ross Ferry =

Community in Nova Scotia, Canada

Coordinates: 46°8′32.56″N 60°35′4.02″W

Ross Ferry in Nova Scotia

Ross Ferry is a small community in the Canadian province of Nova Scotia, located in Victoria County on Cape Breton Island.

== Parks ==
- Cape Breton Highlands National Park
- Ross Ferry Provincial Park
