= Millville Boularderie =

Community in Nova Scotia, Canada

Coordinates: 46°16′1.64″N 60°20′9.03″W

Millville Boularderie in Nova Scotia

Millville Boularderie is a community in the Canadian province of Nova Scotia, located in the Cape Breton Regional Municipality on Boularderie Island.

== Bibliography ==
- Millville Boularderie on Destination Nova Scotia
