= Marble Mountain, Nova Scotia =

Community in Nova Scotia, Canada

Coordinates: 45°49′15.60″N 61°2′26.32″W

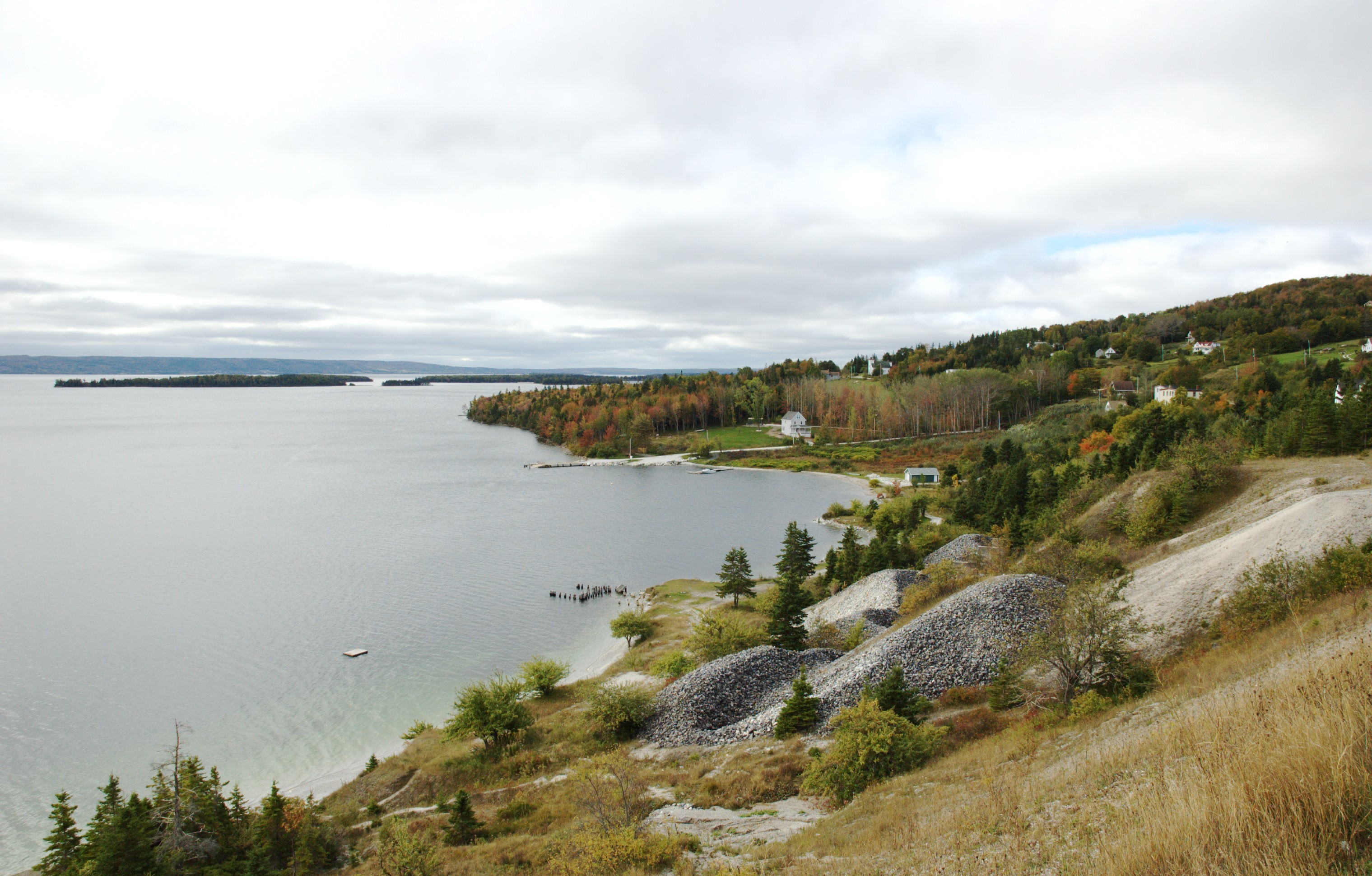
View of Bras d'Or Lake from Marble Mountain

Marble Mountain (Scottish Gaelic: A' Bheinn a Tuath) is a community in the Canadian province of Nova Scotia, located in Inverness County.

== History ==
Marble Mountain was settled in the 1830s, and was once referred to as North Mountain. A deposit of marble was discovered in the area in 1868 by the geologist Nicholas Brown from Prince Edward Island. In 1869, limestone deposits were also discovered, and a man named Dugald McLachlan established the McLachlan Lime Company in 1884 to begin extracting it. In 1902, the company was purchased by Desco, and the area became a major source for limestone used in their furnaces. Desco stopped mining in Marble Mountain in 1903.

The area had a population of 68 people in 1956.
