= St. Anns, Nova Scotia =

St. Anns Baile Anna (Scottish Gaelic)
- Unincorporated area
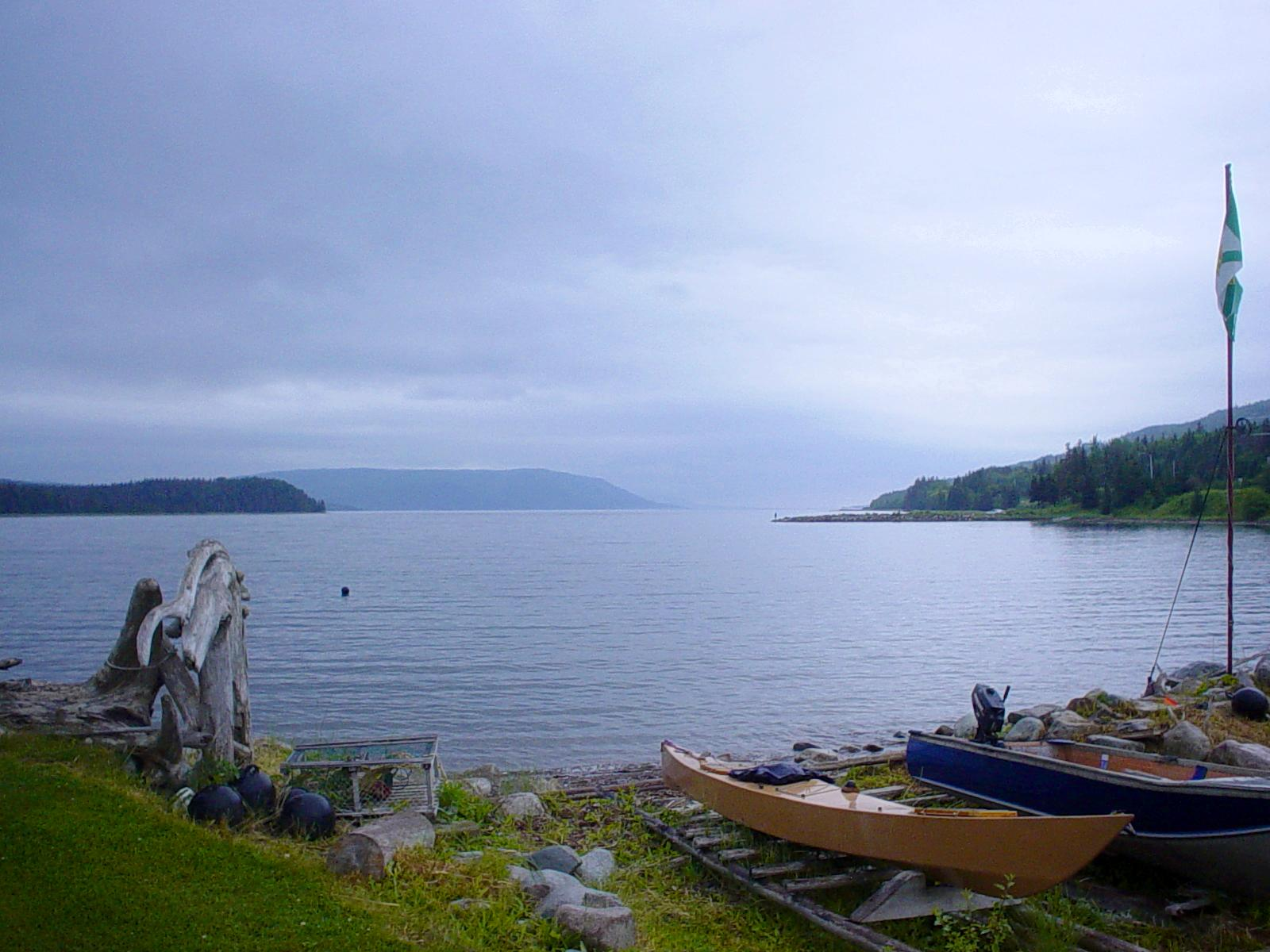

- Location in Nova Scotia
- Coordinates: 46°12′46″N 60°37′13″W
- Country: Canada
- Province: Nova Scotia
- County: Victoria County

Government
  - MP: Jaime Battiste
  - MLA: Keith Bain
- Time zone: UTC-4 (AST)
  - Summer (DST): UTC-3 (ADT)
- Postal code: B0E 1B0
- Area code: 902

St. Anns is an unincorporated area in the Municipality of the County of Victoria, Cape Breton Island, Nova Scotia. It is on the southwestern shore of St. Anns Bay at the intersection of the Cabot Trail and Nova Scotia Highway 105, the Trans-Canada Highway.

It is home to the Gaelic College of Celtic Arts and Crafts, which is located on the property of 19th century clergyman, Norman McLeod who led approximately 800 residents from Canada to Waipu, New Zealand, during the 1850s.
