= Mill Creek, Cape Breton =

Community in Nova Scotia, Canada

Coordinates: 46°16′30.69″N 60°18′1.88″W

Mill Creek in Nova Scotia

Mill Creek is a community in the Canadian province of Nova Scotia, located in the Cape Breton Regional Municipality on Cape Breton Island.

== Demographics ==
In the 2021 Census of Population conducted by Statistics Canada, Mill Creek had a population of 413 living in 175 of its 187 total private dwellings, a change of −4% from its 2016 population of 430. With a land area of 7.29 km^{2} (2.81 sq mi), it had a population density of 56.7/km^{2} (146.7/sq mi) in 2021.

== History ==
Mill Creek appears in Nova Scotia's provincial vital statistics records as a place of birth and residence in Cape Breton County from at least 1919. A 1922 birth registration from the community records the child's father, himself born in Mill Creek, as a coal miner.
