= Nyanza, Nova Scotia =

Community in Nova Scotia, Canada

Coordinates: 46°5′2″N 60°54′9″W

Nyanza in Nova Scotia

Nyanza is a small community in the Canadian province of Nova Scotia, located in Victoria County on Cape Breton Island. The community is named after Apostolic Vicariate of Victoria Nyanza.

The craft beer producer Big Spruce Brewing is located in Nyanza.
