= Irish Cove, Nova Scotia =

Community in Nova Scotia, Canada

Coordinates: 45°49′37.65″N 60°39′56.32″W

Irish Cove in Nova Scotia

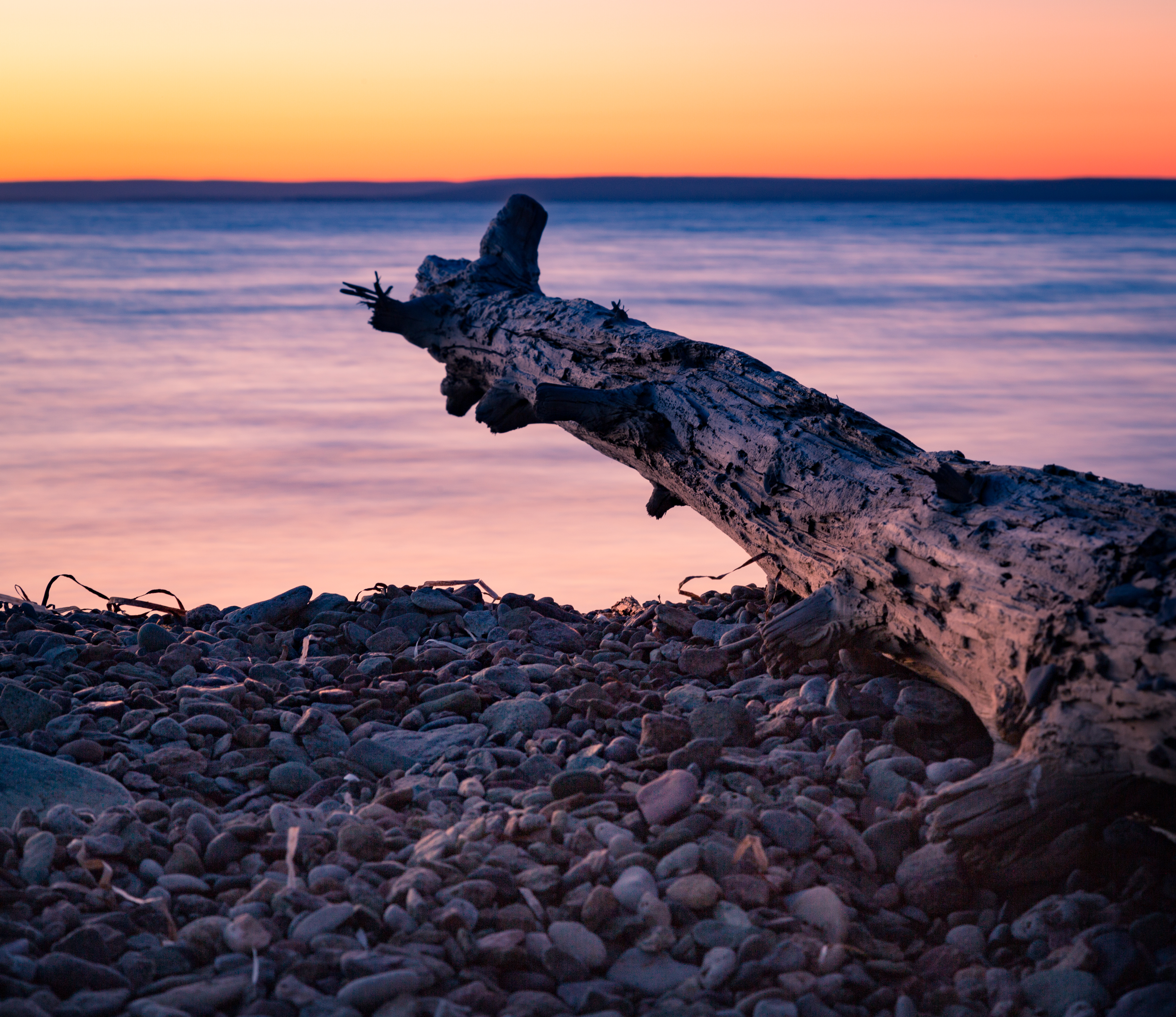
Sunset over Bras d'Or Lake in Irish Cove, Nova Scotia, in September 2015

Irish Cove (Mi'kmawi'simk: Kul'pamkitk) is a small community in the Canadian province of Nova Scotia, spanning the border that divides Richmond County and Cape Breton County. The community is also home to a provincial picnic park.

The original Mi'kmaq place name, Kul'pamkitk, means "flowing round."
