= The Gaelic College =

Educational institution in Nova Scotia

The Royal Cape Breton Gaelic College
- Colaisde na Gàidhlig
- Type: Educational institution
- Established: 1938
- Affiliations: Non-denominational
- President: Rodney MacDonald
- Location: St. Ann's, Nova Scotia, Canada; 46°12′49″N 60°36′20″W
- Campus: Cabot Trail
- Colours: Red & black
- Website: www.gaeliccollege.edu

The Gaelic College (Scottish Gaelic: Colaisde na Gàidhlig), formally The Royal Cape Breton Gaelic College (Scottish Gaelic: Colaisde Rìoghail na Gàidhlig), is a non-profit educational institution located in the community of St. Anns, Nova Scotia, on Cape Breton Island, along the Cabot Trail. Founded in 1938, its focus has been on the perpetuation of Highland Scottish Gaelic culture.

== History ==
Colaisde na Gàidhlig, The Gaelic College, was founded in 1938 by Presbyterian minister the Reverend A.W.R. MacKenzie, opening in a one-room log building on land in St. Ann's.

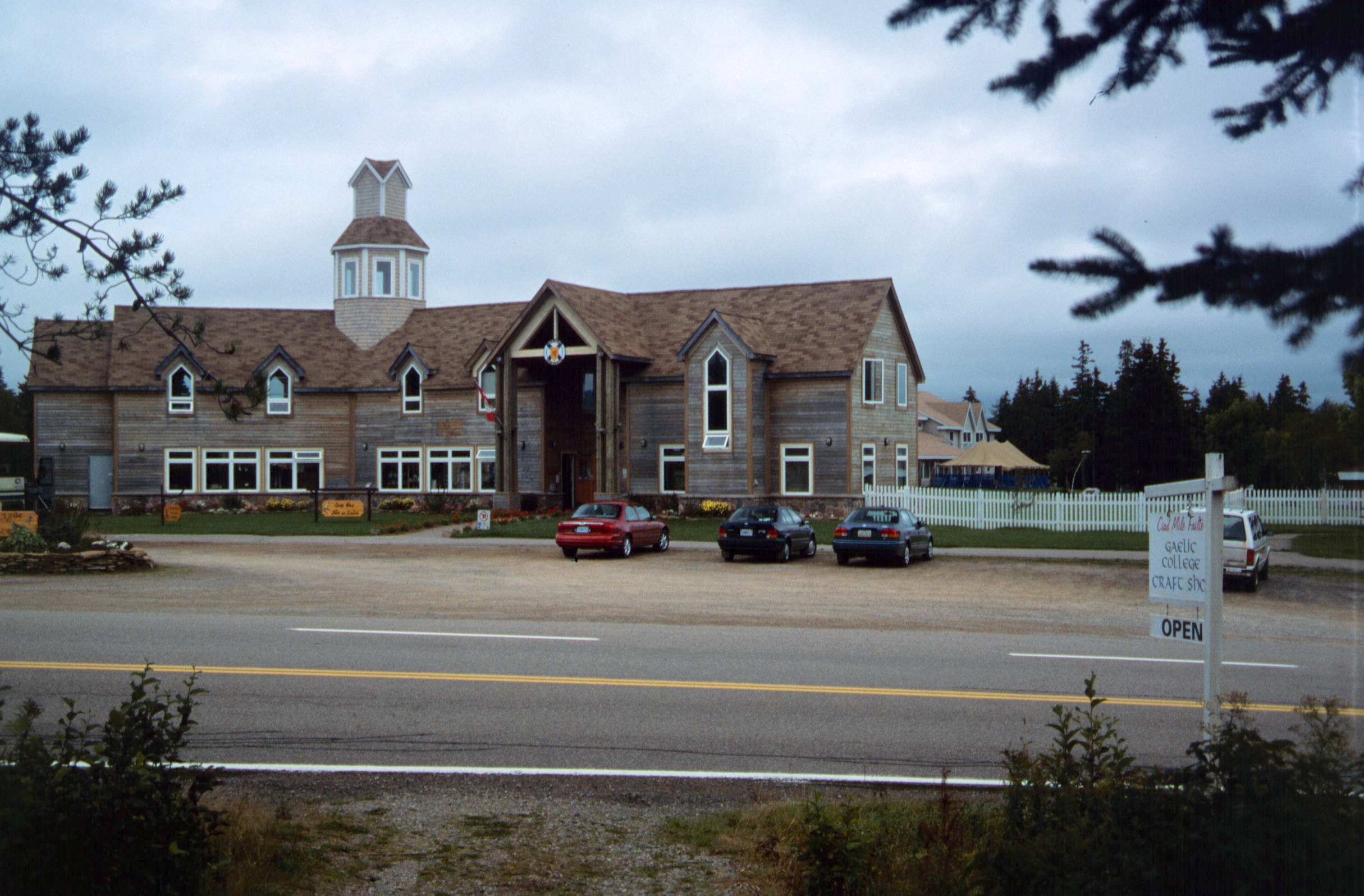
The Gaelic College as it looked in 1998.

In September 2011, former Premier of Nova Scotia Rodney MacDonald was named president of the college. In December 2013, to recognize the 75th anniversary of the college's founding, its name was changed to "The Royal Cape Breton Gaelic College" (Colaisde Rìoghail na Gàidhlig) after Elizabeth II, the reigning Canadian monarch, granted permission for use of the prefix "royal", as requested to the federal Cabinet by the college's board of directors. However some, including Allan MacMaster, Member of the Nova Scotia House of Assembly for Inverness, objected to the name change as offensive to Nova Scotians descended from Highlanders who had had to leave Scotland because of the Highland Clearances. In response Kirk McRae, the Acting Chair of the Gaelic College, said it was "just an honour of name, it doesn't take away what the goals are of the college ... that is to grow the Gaelic culture." The Chairman of the Monarchist League of Canada, Robert Finch, characterized the prefix as "a Canadian honour distinct from history's disputes between English and Scots." In March 2014, the board of governors decided to discontinue day-to-day use of the "royal" prefix.

In 2021, the college announced the opening of a new Gaelic-medium school at its satellite campus, Beinn Mhabu (Mabou Hill College) – the first of its kind in North America.The satellite centre will also host a Gaelic-language internet radio station, as well as artists, and will provide courses accredited by Cape Breton University.

== Mission ==
The institution's mission is:

"To promote, preserve and perpetuate through studies in all related areas: the culture, music, language, arts, crafts, customs and traditions of immigrants from the Highlands of Scotland."

The early years of the college's history were dedicated to the instruction of the Scottish Gaelic language, which, in the 1930s, was under significant threat of dying out. It had once been spoken by over 100,000 Nova Scotians until the advent of modern transport and communications in the early 20th century began to force English assimilation in the agrarian economies of Cape Breton Island and Nova Scotia.

Today, the organization has a broader mandate to preserve the culture of the Scottish Highlanders, who settled in the area. Thousands of students from all over North America and around the world attend both summer sessions and courses held throughout the year. The college is also home base for organizations like the Cape Breton Fiddlers' Association and the annual Celtic Colours International Festival.

== Program ==
The college's curriculum covers the following:

- Gaelic language
- Gaelic song
- Gaelic history
- Gaelic storytelling
- Gaelic drama
- Highland bagpiping
- Cape Breton fiddling
- Cape Breton piano accompaniment
- Guitar accompaniment
- Cape Breton step dance
- Scottish highland dance
- Bodhrán
- Celtic harp
- Tin Whistle
- Celtic weaving and textiles

== See also ==
- Higher education in Nova Scotia
- Education in Canada
- List of Canadian organizations with royal prefix
