= Wagmatcook 1 =

Mi'kmaq reserve in Nova Scotia, Canada

Coordinates: 46.076°N 60.917°W

Location of Wagmatcook 1 in Nova Scotia

Wagmatcook 1 is a Mi'kmaq reserve located in Victoria County, Nova Scotia.

It is administratively part of the Wagmatcook First Nation.
