= Margaree Forks, Nova Scotia =

Community in Nova Scotia, Canada

Coordinates: 46°19′57″N 61°5′43″W

Margaree Forks in Nova Scotia

Margaree Forks is a small community in the Canadian province of Nova Scotia, located in Inverness County on Cape Breton Island.

Among the early settlers of Margaree Forks were Archibald Chisholm and his son Joseph, who immigrated from Strathglass in Scotland in 1809.

In 1859, a postal way office was established at Margaree Forks. A post office was established in the community in 1865, and a school was built there in 1872. New schools were established in 1925 and 1963.

Margaree Forks had a population of 361 people in 1956.
