= New Dominion, Nova Scotia =

Community in Nova Scotia, Canada

Coordinates: 46°15′0.96″N 60°24′26.26″W

New Dominion in Nova Scotia

New Dominion is a community in the Canadian province of Nova Scotia, located in the Cape Breton Regional Municipality on Cape Breton Island.
