= 100-series highways (Nova Scotia) =

Highway system in Nova Scotia

Nova Scotia 100-series highways
- Standard highway markers for Nova Scotia

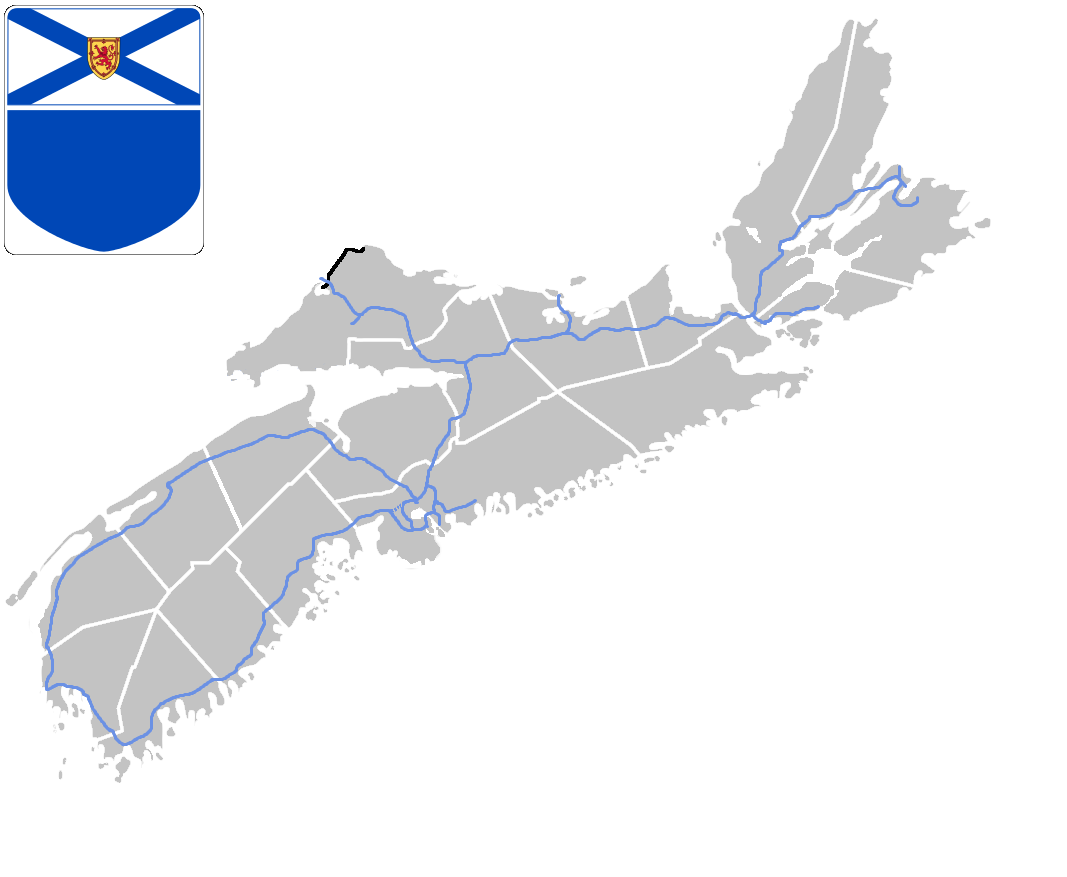
- Map of the system

Highway names
- Arterial (100-series) highways: Nova Scotia Highway 1XX (Hwy 1XX)

System links
- Provincial highways in Nova Scotia; 100-series

The 100-Series highways are a series of arterial highways in the Canadian province of Nova Scotia.

A 100-series highway is a designation applied to a highway that can be a controlled-access expressway, Super-2, or fully divided freeway. The designation can also be applied in some cases to sections of uncontrolled access roads which are deemed strategically important and which will be upgraded in the future to controlled-access.

These highways connect major population centres such as the Halifax Regional Municipality and Cape Breton Regional Municipality with smaller population centres such as Yarmouth, Truro, New Glasgow and Amherst, as well as the neighbouring province of New Brunswick.

Some of the 100-series highways also carry the Trans-Canada Highway designation on their routes.

The typical naming convention is to add 100 to a route containing a local trunk highway. E.g. Trunk 3 is a local trunk highway and Highway 103 is the 100-series highway running parallel to Trunk 3 in this corridor.

A 100-series freeway is roughly equivalent in function to the 400-series highways of Ontario, Autoroutes of Quebec, or the Interstate Highway System of the United States, albeit on a much reduced scale and amount of traffic. Many of these highways were developed during the 1960s–1990s as political projects and proved detrimental to rural railway service in the province, resulting in many rail line abandonments.

== Route list ==
Number	Length (km)	Length (mi)	Southern or western terminus	Northern or eastern terminus	Local names	Formed	Removed	Notes
Hwy 101	308.5	191.7	Trunk 3 in Yarmouth	Hwy 102 / Trunk 1 in Lower Sackville	Harvest Highway	1962	current	Passes through the Annapolis Valley and Digby.
Hwy 102	100.8	62.6	Halifax	Hwy 104 in Onslow	• Veterans Memorial Highway • Bicentennial Drive	1958	current	Passes through Bedford, Lower Sackville, and Truro.
Hwy 103	291.3	181.0	Hardscratch Road in Yarmouth	Hwy 102 in Halifax	Fishermens' Memorial Highway	1963	current	Passes through Bridgewater, Liverpool, and Barrington Passage.
Hwy 104 (TCH)	274.1	170.3	New Brunswick border near Fort Lawrence (continues as NB 2)	Hwy 105 / Trunk 4 / Trunk 19 in Port Hastings	• Trans-Canada Highway • Miners Memorial Highway	1964	current	Passes through Amherst, Truro, New Glasgow, and Antigonish.
Hwy 104	37.3	23.2	Trunk 4 near Port Hawkesbury	Trunk 4 near St. Peter's		1976	current	
Hwy 105 (TCH)	141.8	88.1	Hwy 104 / Trunk 4 / Trunk 19 in Port Hastings	Marine Atlantic ferry terminal in North Sydney (continues as NL 1)	• Trans-Canada Highway • Mabel and Alexander Graham Bell Way	1970	current	Ferry connection to Newfoundland and Labrador.
Hwy 106 (TCH)	19.4	12.1	Hwy 104 near New Glasgow	Northumberland Ferries terminal in Caribou (continues as PE 1)	• Trans-Canada Highway • Jubilee Highway	1968	current	Ferry connection to Prince Edward Island.
Hwy 107	52.1	32.4	Hwy 102 near Bedford	Trunk 7 in Musquodoboit Harbour		1972	current	
Hwy 111	12.9	8.0	Trunk 2 in Halifax	Route 322 in Dartmouth	• Circumferential Highway • Highway of Heroes	1960	current	
Hwy 113	9.9	6.2	Hwy 103 in Hubley	Hwy 102 in Bedford		proposed	—	
Hwy 118	14.2	8.8	Hwy 111 in Dartmouth	Hwy 102 near Fall River		1971	current	The highway has the only collector-express section in Atlantic Canada.
Hwy 125	28.3	17.6	Hwy 105 near Sydney Mines	Trunk 4 in Sydney	Peacekeepers Way	1970	current	Passes through North Sydney.
Hwy 142	6.1	3.8	Trunk 2 in Springhill	Hwy 104 near Springhill		1970	current	
Hwy 162	8.4	5.2	Hwy 105 near Bras d'Or	Point Aconi		1978	current	
Unbuilt or under construction

Historical Note: Nova Scotia's original arterial highway number system had route number signs in the same shape as the U.S. Highway route number signs. These signs are now used for trunk highways.

Nova Scotia is planning to convert many 100-series highways to divided 4-lane highways during the 21st century, pending availability of funding.

== See also ==
- List of Nova Scotia provincial highways
- 400-series highways (Ontario)
- 400-series highways (British Columbia)
- Autoroutes of Quebec
