= Big Bras d'Or, Nova Scotia =

Community in Nova Scotia, Canada

Coordinates: 46°16′12″N 60°25′25″W

Big Bras d'Or in Nova Scotia

Big Bras d'Or is an unincorporated community in the Canadian province of Nova Scotia, located in the Victoria County on Cape Breton Island.

== History ==
The community is the site of St. James-Knox Presbyterian Church, following the 2023 closure and merging of the Knox Presbyterian Church in nearby Ross Ferry with the St. James Church. The churchyard contains a Commonwealth War Grave from the Second World War.
