= Bras d'Or, Nova Scotia =

Community in Nova Scotia, Canada

Coordinates: 46°14′58″N 60°17′1″W

Bras d'Or in Nova Scotia

Bras d'Or is a community in the Canadian province of Nova Scotia, located in Cape Breton Regional Municipality.

== Demographics ==
In the 2021 Census of Population conducted by Statistics Canada, Bras D'Or had a population of 96 living in 50 of its 55 total private dwellings, a change of -7.7% from its 2016 population of 104. With a land area of 1.02 km^{2} (0.39 sq mi), it had a population density of 94.1/km^{2} (243.8/sq mi) in 2021.
