= Municipality of the County of Victoria =

County municipality in Nova Scotia, Canada

- County municipality
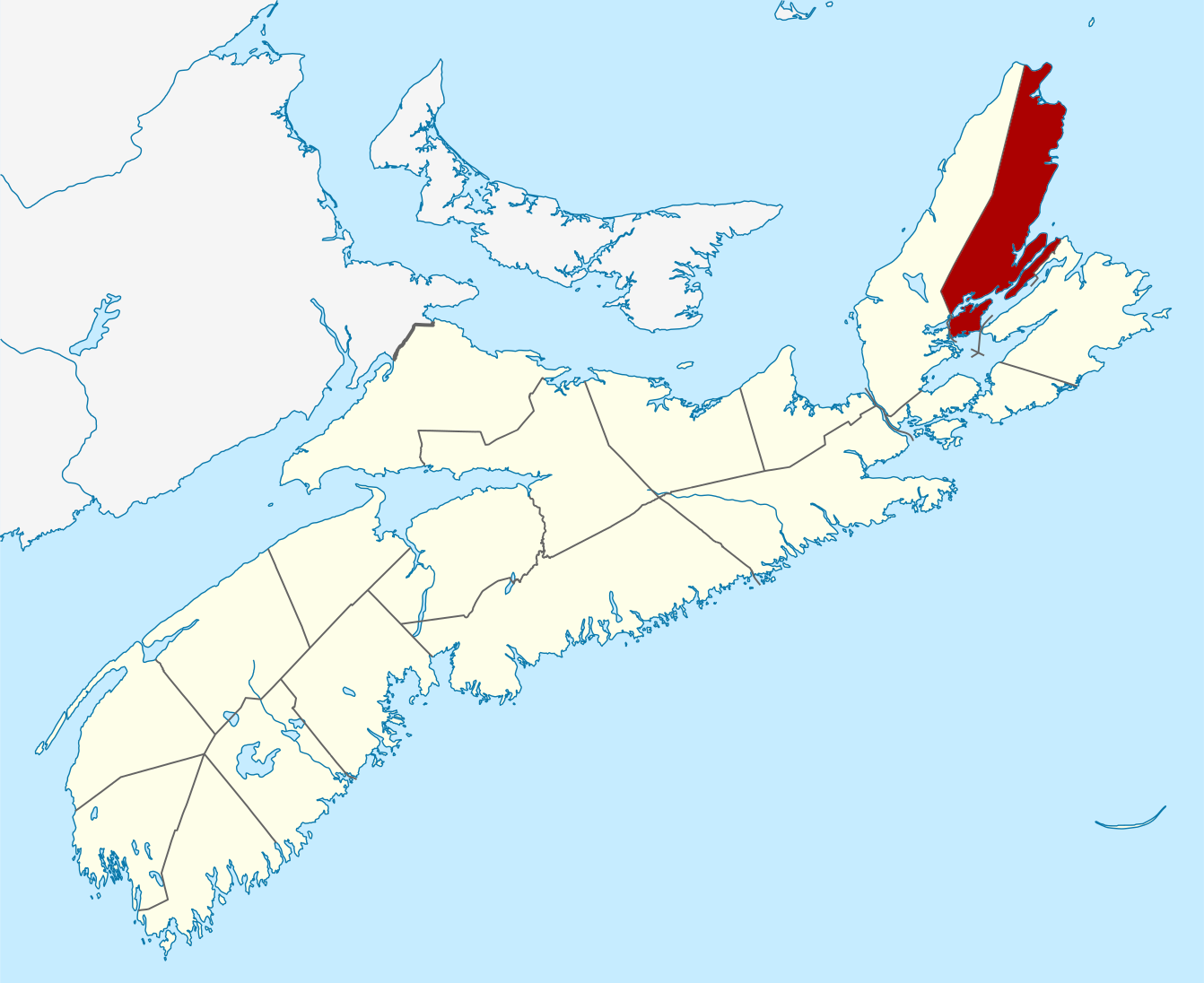
- Location of Victoria County, Nova Scotia
- Coordinates: 46.4°N 60.6°W
- Country: Canada
- Province: Nova Scotia
- Founded: 1851
- Incorporated: 1879
- Electoral Districts Federal: Sydney—Victoria
- Provincial: Victoria-The Lakes

Government
  - Type: Municipality of the County of Victoria

Area
  - Land: 2,870.85 km^{2} (1,108.44 sq mi)

Population (2016)
  - Total: 7,089
  - Density: 2.5/km^{2} (6.5/sq mi)
  - Change 2011-16: ▼0.4%
- Time zone: UTC-4 (AST)
  - Summer (DST): UTC-3 (ADT)
- Area code: 902
- Dwellings: 4,437
- Median Income*: $44,134 CDN
- Unemployment rate: 26.3%
- Website: www.victoriacounty.com
- Median household income, 2005 (all households)

The Municipality of the County of Victoria is a county municipality on Cape Breton Island, Nova Scotia, Canada. It provides local government to about 7,000 residents of the eponymous historical county except for the Wagmatcook 1 reserve. The municipal offices are in the village of Baddeck.

== History ==
Prior to European settlement, the area was sparsely inhabited by the Miꞌkmaq, who hunted in the area.

French Jesuits settled at St. Anns in 1629. British settlement began in the 1700s after the territory had been ceded by France.

In 1839, a property containing an inn, a tavern, and a post office was built in Baddeck. In 1841, Charles James Campbell opened a store, began shipbuilding, and developed coal mining.

In 1851, Victoria County was split from Cape Breton County, and Baddeck became the site for the new county's jail and court house, and later the site of Alexander Graham Bell's Beinn Bhreagh, a summer residence and research centre, and the Bell Boatyard. Bell is commemorated at the Alexander Graham Bell National Historic Site.

The county is named for Queen Victoria.

== Demographics ==
As a Census divisions of Canada in 2016, Victoria County had a population of 7,089 in 4,437 dwellings, a change of −0.4% from its 2011 population of 7,115.

== Economy ==
Fishing and tourism are the main industries.

== See also ==
- Communities in Victoria County, Nova Scotia
- Cabot Trail: a scenic drive that circles Cape Breton Highlands National Park in the north of the municipality.
