= Victoria County, Nova Scotia =

Victoria County
- County
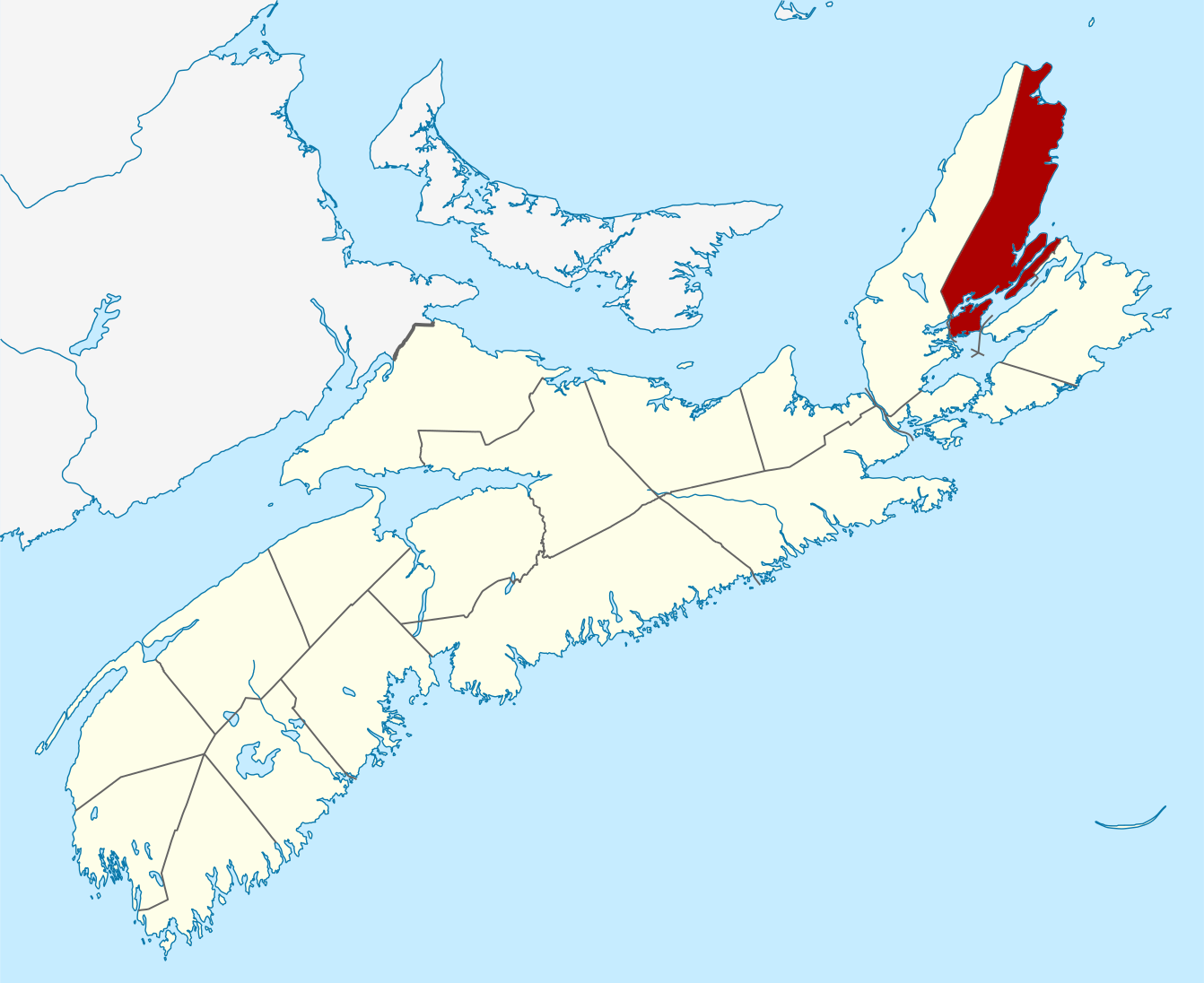
- Location of Victoria County, Nova Scotia
- Coordinates: 46.4°N 60.6°W
- Country: Canada
- Province: Nova Scotia
- Founded: 1851
- Incorporated: 1879
- Electoral Districts Federal: Sydney—Victoria
- Provincial: Victoria-The Lakes

Government
  - Type: Municipality of the County of Victoria

Area
  - Land: 2,870.85 km^{2} (1,108.44 sq mi)

Population (2021)
  - Total: 7,441
  - Density: 2.5/km^{2} (6.5/sq mi)
  - Change 2016-21: ▲5.0%
- Time zone: UTC-4 (AST)
  - Summer (DST): UTC-3 (ADT)
- Area code: 902
- Dwellings: 4,437
- Median Income*: $44,134 CDN
- Unemployment rate: 26.3%
- Median household income, 2005 (all households)

Victoria County (Scottish Gaelic: Siorramachd Bhioctoria; French: Comté de Victoria) is an historical county and census division of Nova Scotia, Canada. Local government is provided by the Municipality of the County of Victoria and the Wagmatcook 1 reserve.

== History ==
Named after Queen Victoria, it was established by statute in 1851. Cape Breton County was divided into two separate counties in that year, with the northern portion becoming Victoria County.

Like other parts of Nova Scotia, the county was sparsely inhabited by the Miꞌkmaq, who hunted in the area.

The earliest settlers of Victoria County were almost exclusively Loyalists, with most arriving from the United States in the years following the American Revolutionary War. It was noted by historian G.G. Patterson in 1885 that "In (Queen Victoria's) broad domain upon which the sun never sets, we venture to say there dwell none more loyal than (Victoria County's) few thousand inhabitants".

The man responsible for the early settling of Victoria County is widely considered to be Capt. Jonathan Jones, a Loyalist who originally captained a ship bringing applicants to the area who had received land grants in the late 1700s. Among these was a Mr. Cuyler, the former Mayor of Albany, New York, who had forfeited his holdings due to his loyalty to the British Crown and who was eager to settle in the Cape Breton colony. Cape Breton had been separated from the mainland and was declared a colony unto itself in 1784. Jones’ land grant bears the date 19 October 1790. Jones was appointed magistrate and given the land and all wood upon it with the exception of the white pine, which were reserved for the King's use along with all mines and minerals. Jones was required to annually pay two shillings for every hundred acres to begin after the expiration of ten years. For every fifty acres of farmable land, Jones was required to clear and cultivate at least three acres and for every fifty acres of land deemed barren, he was required to keep upon it three cattle, until such time as three acres for every fifty be cleared. He was required also to erect a place of dwelling measuring no less than twenty feet in length and sixteen in breadth. Should any ground be rocky, he was by the terms of the grant compelled to employ a quarry or mine, employing one able man for every fifty acres. Should any of these conditions not be met, Jones’ grant would become void.

Any settler who wished to come into possession of a part of this land would make the following declaration, failure of which to do so resulted in the purchase being null and void:

I …………….. do promise and declare, that I will maintain and defend to the utmost of my power, the authority of the King in his Parliament, as the supreme Legislature of this Island.

Under Jones, many improvements were made, including the construction of Victoria County's first sawmill, followed by a second sawmill at the mouth of the Baddeck River. Large crops of potatoes were subsequently produced in Victoria County, and ships would routinely carry this farm produce to Newfoundland for sale.

Though Jones is regarded as the first settler in Victoria County, local legend had some six or seven families settling at present-day Englishtown a few years prior to his arrival. An elderly Englishtown resident, well acquainted with the early history of the area, in the late 1880s told historian G.G. Patterson that the earliest settlers had arrived there between 1770 and 1780. Though Patterson believed these families had indeed settled there, he regarded the timeline as impossible, believing they could not have come before 1782 and that they most likely did not arrive until at least five years later. Patterson's research indicated that these six or seven families reached St. Anne's (as Englishtown was then known) at different times and by different routes in fishing vessels. They were chiefly English (surviving records identify two families as Guinn and Roberts), but records show one family from Ireland and a bachelor from Virginia who, a few years later, went insane and hanged himself. Eight years later a German family named Willhausen arrived, and records show no further settlers arriving until an influx of Scots some 40 years later. Little attention was given to farming and the small community survived on the fishery. Little is known about these earliest settlers due to the fact that their immediate descendants subsequently emigrated to other areas in search of better conditions.

The chief means of transport was canoe by river and ship by sea, as no roads existed. A rather extensive network of paths and trails developed over time through the forests. Some communities such as Black Point were completely isolated, and remained so well into the twentieth century.

In a report dated 11 December 1861, it is noted that Victoria County at that time was settled largely by Scotch highlanders from the mainland and western islands of Scotland, with a few settlers from England, Ireland, and "the low countries". The report noted "a great want" felt by these settlers for regular marts and fairs "where seeds, cattle, etc. could be exchanged with mutual advantages, and possibly new articles of culture introduced, that for want of the facilities requisite for obtaining these, are never attempted to be raised by the county."

Though the census of 1818 gives no number, written accounts dating from 1820 state the population of the area from Cape North south to Big Bras d’Or as being "no more than 100 families" at that time.

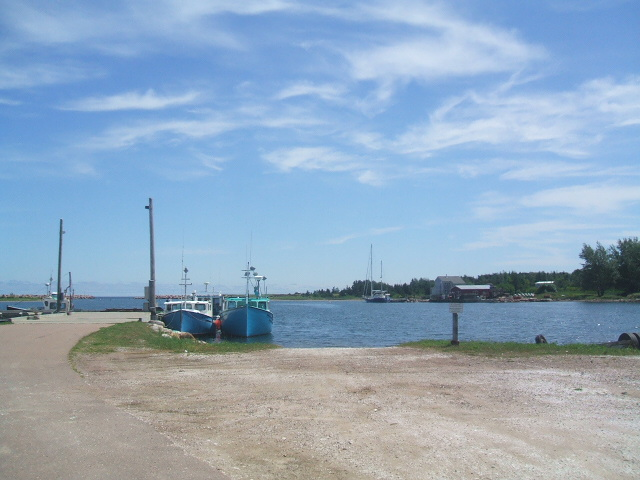
Cape Islander fishing vessels in northeastern Victoria County in 2010

== Demographics ==
As a census division in the 2021 Census of Population conducted by Statistics Canada, Victoria County had a population of 7,441 living in 3,280 of its 4,753 total private dwellings, a change of 5% from its 2016 population of 7,089. With a land area of 2,836.19 km^{2} (1,095.06 sq mi), it had a population density of 2.6/km^{2} (6.8/sq mi) in 2021.

Forming the majority of the Victoria County census division, the Municipality of the County of Victoria, including its Subdivisions A and B, had a population of 6,750 living in 3,079 of its 4,543 total private dwellings, a change of 3% from its 2016 population of 6,552. With a land area of 2,832.48 km^{2} (1,093.63 sq mi), it had a population density of 2.4/km^{2} (6.2/sq mi) in 2021.

Population trend

Census	Population	Change (%)
2021	7,441	▲5.0%
2016	7,089	▼0.4%
2011	7,115	▼6.3%
2006	7,594	▼4.6%
2001	7,962	▼6.1%
1996	8,482	▼2.6%
1991	8,708	▲0.0%
1986	8,704	▲1.0%
1981	8,432	N/A
1941	8,028	
1931	7,926	
1921	8,904	
1911	9,910	
1901	10,571	
1891	12,432	
1881	12,470	
1871	11,346	N/A

Mother tongue language (2011)

Language	Population	Pct (%)
English only	6,460	91.11%
French only	55	0.78%
Non-official languages	550	7.76%
Multiple responses	25	0.35%

Ethnic Groups (2006)

Ethnic Origin	Population	Pct (%)
Scottish	3,955	52.7%
Canadian	2,280	30.4%
English	1,690	22.5%
Irish	1,545	20.6%
French	890	11.9%
First Nations	615	8.2%
German	410	5.5%
Dutch (Netherlands)	305	4.%

== Climate ==
Victoria County experiences a marine influenced humid continental climate, with very delayed seasons.

Climate data for Bay St. Lawrence, 2017–2024 normals, extremes 2017–present
Month	Jan	Feb	Mar	Apr	May	Jun	Jul	Aug	Sep	Oct	Nov	Dec	Year
Record high °C (°F)	20.1 (68.2)	16.9 (62.4)	19.3 (66.7)	23.1 (73.6)	29.1 (84.4)	30.8 (87.4)	32.2 (90.0)	32.4 (90.3)	29.7 (85.5)	24.7 (76.5)	23.9 (75.0)	19.2 (66.6)	32.4 (90.3)
Mean maximum °C (°F)	13.5 (56.3)	12.8 (55.0)	14.0 (57.2)	19.0 (66.2)	24.0 (75.2)	27.6 (81.7)	30.4 (86.7)	29.8 (85.6)	27.5 (81.5)	22.8 (73.0)	20.9 (69.6)	15.4 (59.7)	30.9 (87.6)
Mean daily maximum °C (°F)	1.5 (34.7)	0.5 (32.9)	2.8 (37.0)	6.8 (44.2)	11.9 (53.4)	18.6 (65.5)	23.0 (73.4)	23.5 (74.3)	19.6 (67.3)	14.3 (57.7)	8.7 (47.7)	3.9 (39.0)	11.3 (52.3)
Daily mean °C (°F)	−1.8 (28.8)	−3.2 (26.2)	−0.5 (31.1)	3.2 (37.8)	7.6 (45.7)	14.4 (57.9)	19.4 (66.9)	20.1 (68.2)	16.2 (61.2)	11.1 (52.0)	5.5 (41.9)	1.2 (34.2)	7.8 (46.0)
Mean daily minimum °C (°F)	−4.8 (23.4)	−6.5 (20.3)	−3.8 (25.2)	0.1 (32.2)	3.6 (38.5)	10.4 (50.7)	15.6 (60.1)	16.1 (61.0)	12.4 (54.3)	7.6 (45.7)	2.3 (36.1)	−1.3 (29.7)	4.3 (39.7)
Mean minimum °C (°F)	−11.2 (11.8)	−13.9 (7.0)	−12.7 (9.1)	−4.8 (23.4)	−1.0 (30.2)	2.4 (36.3)	9.5 (49.1)	10.9 (51.6)	6.0 (42.8)	1.3 (34.3)	−2.8 (27.0)	−6.5 (20.3)	−14.9 (5.2)
Record low °C (°F)	−14.6 (5.7)	−20.2 (−4.4)	−14.4 (6.1)	−8.8 (16.2)	−2.2 (28.0)	−0.3 (31.5)	7.6 (45.7)	8.7 (47.7)	3.7 (38.7)	−1.2 (29.8)	−6.8 (19.8)	−12.2 (10.0)	−20.2 (−4.4)
Average rainfall mm (inches)	93.5 (3.68)	46.0 (1.81)	52.3 (2.06)	91.2 (3.59)	76.8 (3.02)	119.9 (4.72)	116.2 (4.57)	130.9 (5.15)	118.2 (4.65)	134.9 (5.31)	193.4 (7.61)	124.3 (4.89)	1,297.4 (51.08)
Source: Cape Breton Mesonet

== Communities ==
Villages

- Baddeck

Unincorporated settlements

- Ingonish

Reserves

- Wagmatcook 1

County municipality and subdivisions

- Municipality of the County of Victoria
  - Victoria Subdivision A
  - Victoria Subdivision B

== Government and politics ==
The county is administered by the Municipality of the County of Victoria. The federal Electoral Riding is Sydney—Victoria.

== Access routes ==
Highways and numbered routes that run through the county, including external routes that start or finish at the county limits:

- Highways
  - Hwy 105 (TCH)
- Trunk Routes
  - Cabot Trail
- Collector Routes:
  - Route 205
  - Route 223
  - Route 312
- External Routes:
  - None

== See also ==
- List of counties of Nova Scotia
- Royal eponyms in Canada
