= St. Peter's, Nova Scotia =

St. Peter's Gaelic: Baile Pheadair
- Village
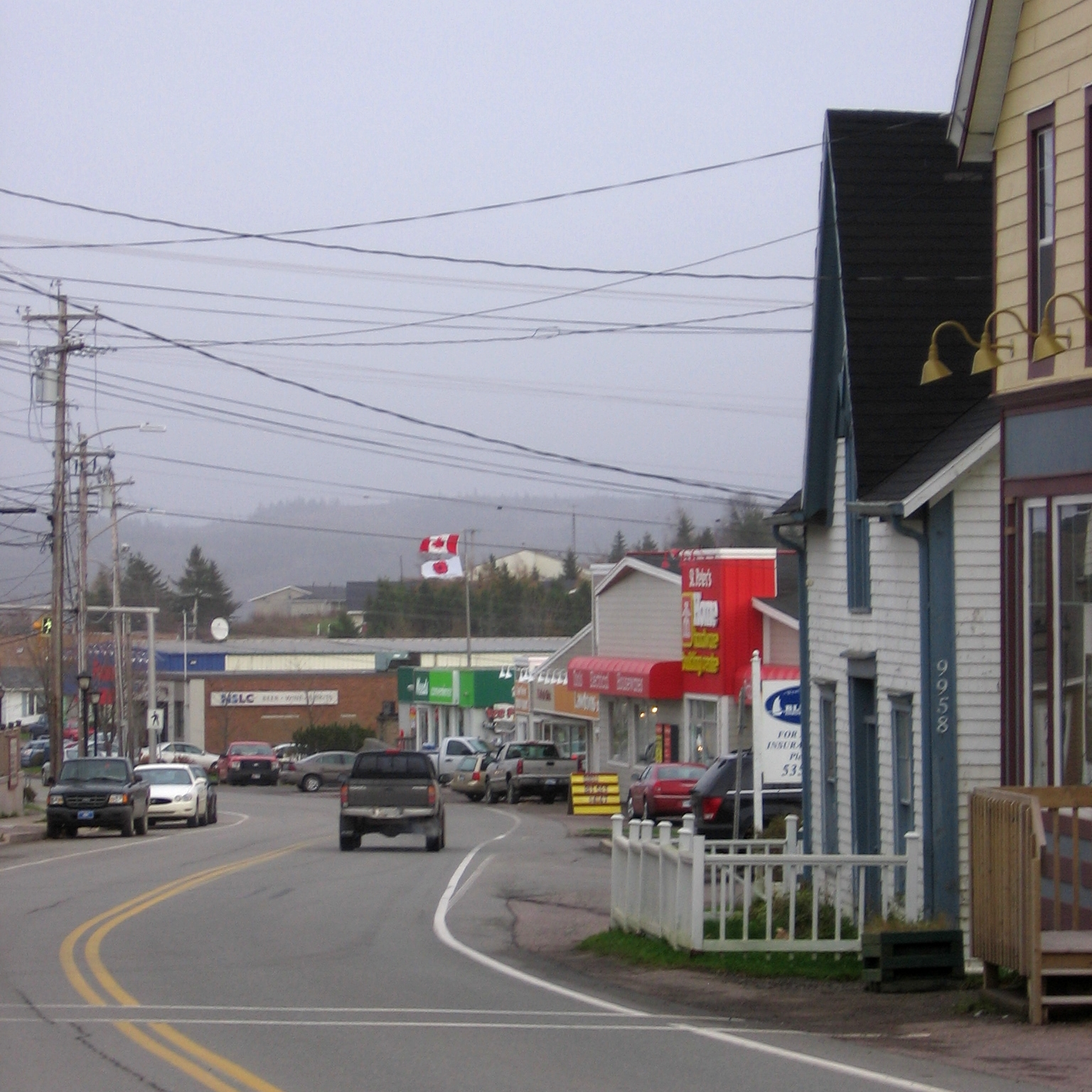
- Nicknames: Gateway to the Bras d'Or; The Village on the Canal; Where the Ocean meets the Inland Sea
- Location of St Peter's St. Peter's (Canada)
- Coordinates: 45.664555°N 60.875744°W
- Country: Canada
- Province: Nova Scotia
- Municipality: Richmond County
- Founded: 1650

Government
  - Village Chair: Esther McDonnell
  - Village Committee: Commissioners of St. Peter's

Area
  - Total: 346.8 km^{2} (133.9 sq mi)
- Highest elevation: 38 m (125 ft)
- Lowest elevation: 0 m (0 ft)

Population (2001)
  - Total: 2,634
  - Density: 7.6/km^{2} (20/sq mi)
- Time zone: UTC-04:00 (AST)
  - Summer (DST): UTC-03:00 (ADT)
- Postal code span: B0E 3B0
- Area code: 902
- Telephone Exchange: 535, 785
- Website: visitstpeters.com

St. Peter's (Scottish Gaelic: Baile Pheadair; formerly known as "Santo Pedro", "Saint-Pierre", "Port Toulouse", and "St. Peters") is a small incorporated village located on Cape Breton Island in Richmond County, Nova Scotia, Canada.

This village is located on a narrow isthmus which separates the southern end of Bras d'Or Lake, known as St. Peter's Inlet, to the north from St. Peter's Bay on the Atlantic Ocean to the south. The isthmus is crossed by the St. Peters Canal which is almost exclusively used by pleasure boats in recent decades.

It is home to Battery Provincial Park. This park is situated on a hillside overlooking St. Peter's Bay adjacent to the St. Peter's Canal National Historic Site. Its entrance is on the east side of the bridge at the canal. Battery features a small saltwater beach (unsupervised), an interpretive display, picnic area with ocean frontage, and 3 kilometres /1.8 miles of hiking trails.

St. Peter's is also located on Trunk 4, one of the province's trunk or secondary highways. An expressway, Highway 104, is scheduled to be extended from its present terminus several kilometres west of St. Peter's to Sydney. When this occurs, Highway 104 will carry the Trans-Canada Highway designation on Cape Breton Island, for which Highway 105 is now designated.

The Nicolas Denys Museum is located in the village, but is only open in the summer. St. Peter's used to be served by a Canadian National Railways branch line which was abandoned in the early 1980s.

== History ==
=== French colony (1630-1758) ===
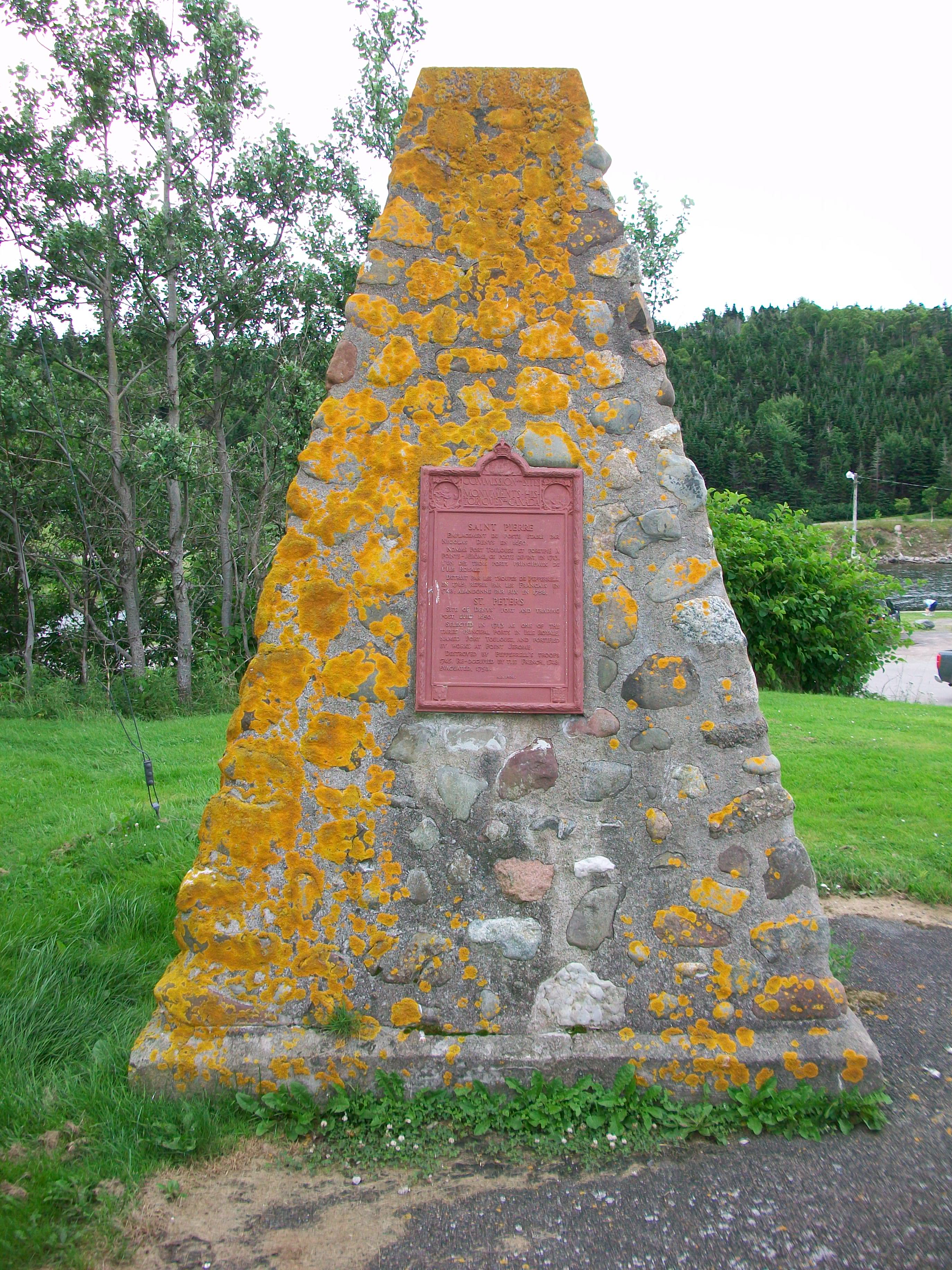
Monument on the site of Nicolas Denys's post at Saint-Pierre. The south entrance to the Canal is in the background.

St. Peter's is one of North America's oldest European establishments. Prior to the arrival of the French, it was a Portuguese trading and fishing post named Santo Pedro in the 16th century. It was abandoned by Portugal in the early 17th century, and taken over by France in the 1630s when a small fortified settlement named Saint-Pierre (again named for Saint Peter) was built by merchants from La Rochelle, France, on the isthmus. In 1650, La Rochelle merchant Nicolas Denys took possession of Saint-Pierre and encouraged the fur trade with local members of the Mi'kmaq Nation who used the isthmus as a canoe portage route between the Atlantic Ocean and Bras d'Or Lake. In addition to establishing a fur trading post, Denys later used the isthmus as a "haulover road" for portaging small sailing ships from Bras d'Or Lake to the Atlantic and vice versa.

==== Raid on Saint-Pierre (1653) ====
In 1653, along with raiding Pentagouet (Castine, Maine), LaHave, Nova Scotia, and Nipisguit (Bathurst, New Brunswick), Emmanuel Le Borgne with 100 men also raided Saint-Pierre. Denys was taken prisoner and returned to France.

Nicolas Denys was here between 1650–1669 and then Cape Breton remained unsettled by Europeans until the establishment of Louisbourg and re-establishment of Fort Dauphin (Englishtown, Nova Scotia) and Saint Peters 1713–1758.

==== Re-established 1713 ====
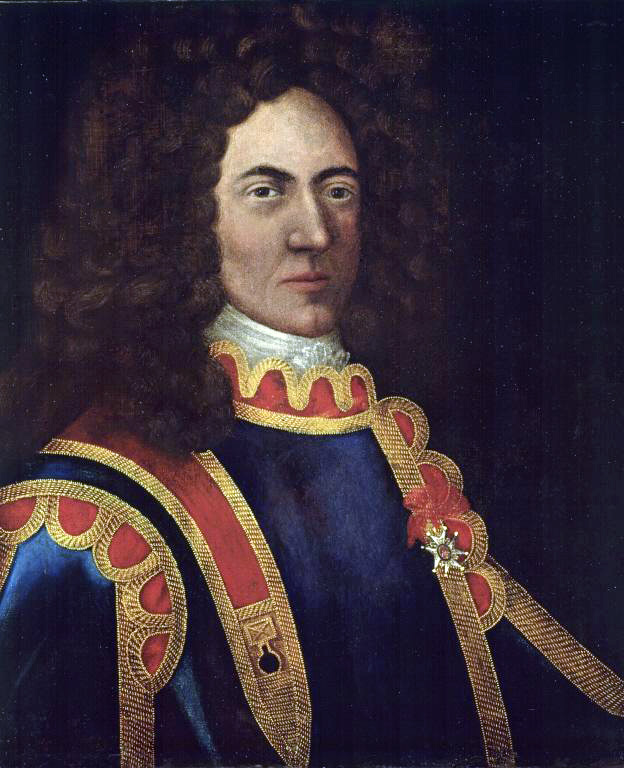
Jean-Baptiste Hertel de Rouville

France lost possession of present-day peninsular (mainland) Nova Scotia to Britain in the Treaty of Utrecht in 1713. France began moving some Acadian colonists to Île Royale (present-day Cape Breton Island) to populate this remaining outpost of French Acadia. Port Toulouse—named after Louis Alexandre, Count of Toulouse—was created by Jean-Baptiste Hertel de Rouville near the 17th-century location of the fortified community of Saint-Pierre as a logistics base and supply centre for the Fortress of Louisbourg. To protect Port Toulouse, Rouville built another fortification on the shore called Point Jérome. A colonial military officer of New France, Rouville is best known in North America for leading the raid on Deerfield, Province of Massachusetts Bay on 29 February 1704 and was widely reviled by the settlers of New England for his tactics of raiding poorly defended settlements.

Along with Saint-Pierre, the French also established Fort St. Anne at present-day Englishtown as the other garrison on Île Royal to support the Fortress of Louisbourg.

==== Siege of St. Peter's ====
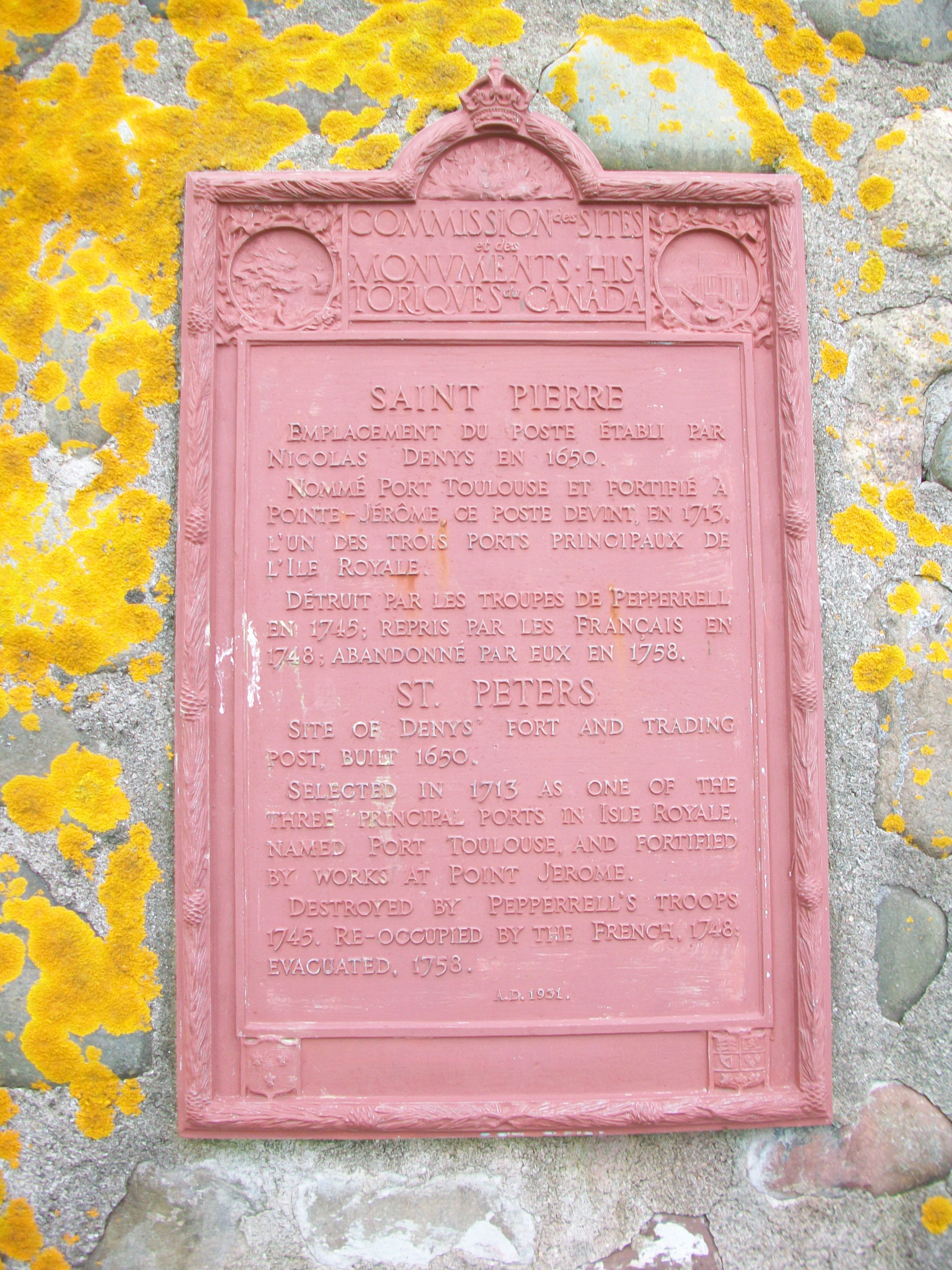
Closeup of plaque on Nicolas Denys's monument.

During King George's War, just prior to the Siege of Louisbourg (1745), the village was attacked in the Siege of Port Toulouse.

In August 1752 during Father Le Loutre's War, the schooners Friendship of Halifax and Dolphin of New England were seized and 21 prisoners held for ransom by Mi'kmaq at St. Peter's.

During the French and Indian War, after the final Siege of Louisbourg (1758), the forts at Port Toulouse and the settlements in the area were destroyed by the British and the rest of Île Royale became a British colony.

=== British colony (1758-1867) ===
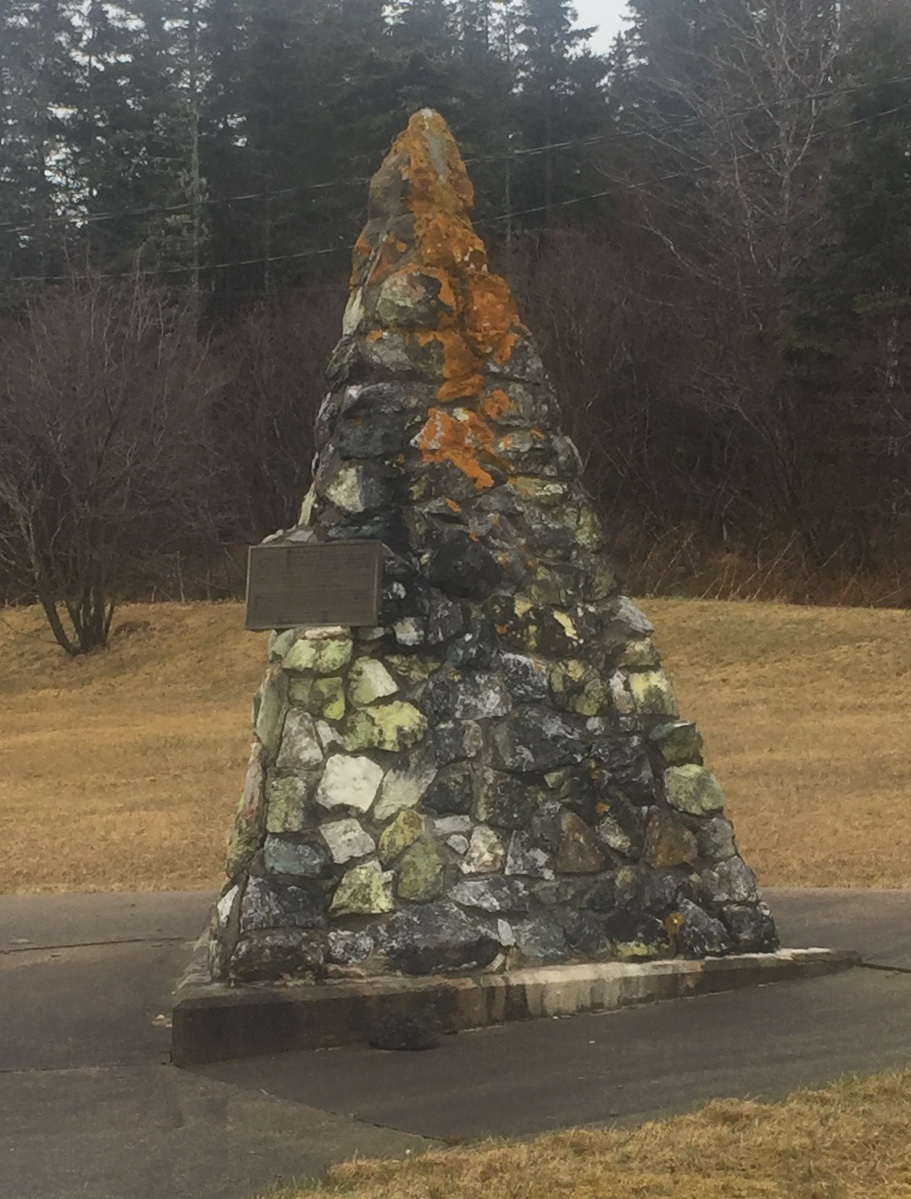
Monument marking location of Laurence Kavanagh's home, St. Peter's, Nova Scotia

After Louisbourg fell on 26 July 1758, French officer Boishébert withdrew, with the British in pursuit. Boishebert brought back a large number of Acadians from the region around Port Toulouse to the security of his post at Beaubears Island on the Miramichi River. (On 13 August 1758 French officer Boishebert left Miramichi, New Brunswick with 400 soldiers, including Acadians from Port Toulouse, for Fort St. George (Thomaston, Maine). His detachment reached there on 9 September but was caught in an ambush and had to withdraw. They then went on to raid Friendship, Maine, where people were killed and others taken prisoner. This was Boishébert's last Acadian expedition. From there, Boishebert and the Acadians went to Quebec and fought in the Battle of Quebec (1759).)

After the war, Britain sponsored settlers and displaced veterans from the Seven Years' War to move into the area of Port Toulouse.

France declared war on Great Britain on 1 February 1793 during the French Revolutionary Wars. In response, Britain built Fort Dorchester on the summit of Mount Granville, a hill overlooking the isthmus.

The village of St. Peter's was founded early in the 1800s. Local residents rehabilitated Denys's old "haulover road", laying wood skids for portaging small sailing ships across the isthmus. The route through Bras d'Or Lake was considered a much shorter and safer voyage to Sydney than travelling around the exposed southern coast of Cape Breton Island. In 1825 a feasibility study into building a canal was undertaken. Construction of the St. Peters Canal began in 1854 and took 15 years of digging, blasting and drilling through a solid granite hill 20 m (66 ft) high to build a channel 800 m (2,600 ft) long with an average width of 30 m (100 ft). The canal opened in 1869 at the dawn of the industrial age on Cape Breton Island. There can be a tidal difference of up to 1.4 m (4.5 ft), thus a double-lock system was designed to regulate water levels. The lock is the only one of its kind in North America.

=== World wars ===
The walls of the canal were lined with timber planking and locks were installed at each end. Modifications to the canal and lock continued until 1917 and the canal saw moderate to heavy use by small coastal steamships and barges, particularly during the First and Second World Wars when coal from the Sydney Coal Field was transported on this sheltered inland route to avoid U-boats. A marble quarry on the western shore of Bras d'Or Lake at Marble Mountain also generated some shipping traffic.

The canal was designated a National Historic Site in 1929 and the federal government took over its operation. Parks Canada is the government agency responsible for its maintenance and operation and undertook a major project to restore both entrances to the canal in 1985. During the post-war, commercial shipping has largely avoided traveling through Bras d'Or Lake and the canal is almost exclusively used by pleasure boats, particularly sailboats with the increased popularity of cruising Bras d'Or Lake in recent decades.

Parks Canada operates the canal from May to October each year. Vessels transiting the canal are limited by the size of the lock, which measures 91.44 m (300.0 ft) long, 14.45 m (47.4 ft) wide, and 4.88 m (16.0 ft) draught. The ruins of Nicholas Denys's Fort Saint-Pierre are located on the grounds of the lockmaster's house (c. 1876), and the ruins of Fort Dorchester are located on Mount Granville, which overlooks the Atlantic approach to the canal.

=== Heritage designations ===
St. Peters contains two National Historic Sites:

1. St. Peters National Historic Site, covering the archaeological remains of Fort Saint-Pierre and Port-Toulouse; and
2. St. Peters Canal National Historic Site

The 1876 Lockmaster's House beside the canal is a Recognized Federal Heritage Building, while the circa 1870 MacAskill House, the birthplace of photographer Wallace MacAskill, is a Provincially Registered Property. The Fort Toulouse Archaeological Site is protected under the provincial Special Places Protection Act.

== See also ==
- Bras d'Or Lake
- St. Peters Canal
