= Jean Berger (painter) =

Jean Berger (c. 1681 – after 1709), was a soldier from France who is known to have been in Lower Canada from about 1700 to 1709. He seems to have spent a significant portion of that time dealing with problems with the law.

His importance to Canadian history lies in his painting career. It is certain that he produced important Religious painting: a 1706 painted altar frontal for the church of La Sainte-Famille on Île d’Orléans. A number of important portraits are generally ascribed to him. Two are in the McCord Museum of Canadian History at McGill University including one of Jean-Baptiste Hertel de Rouville.
