= Barthélemy Vimont =

French Jesuit missionary (1594–1667)

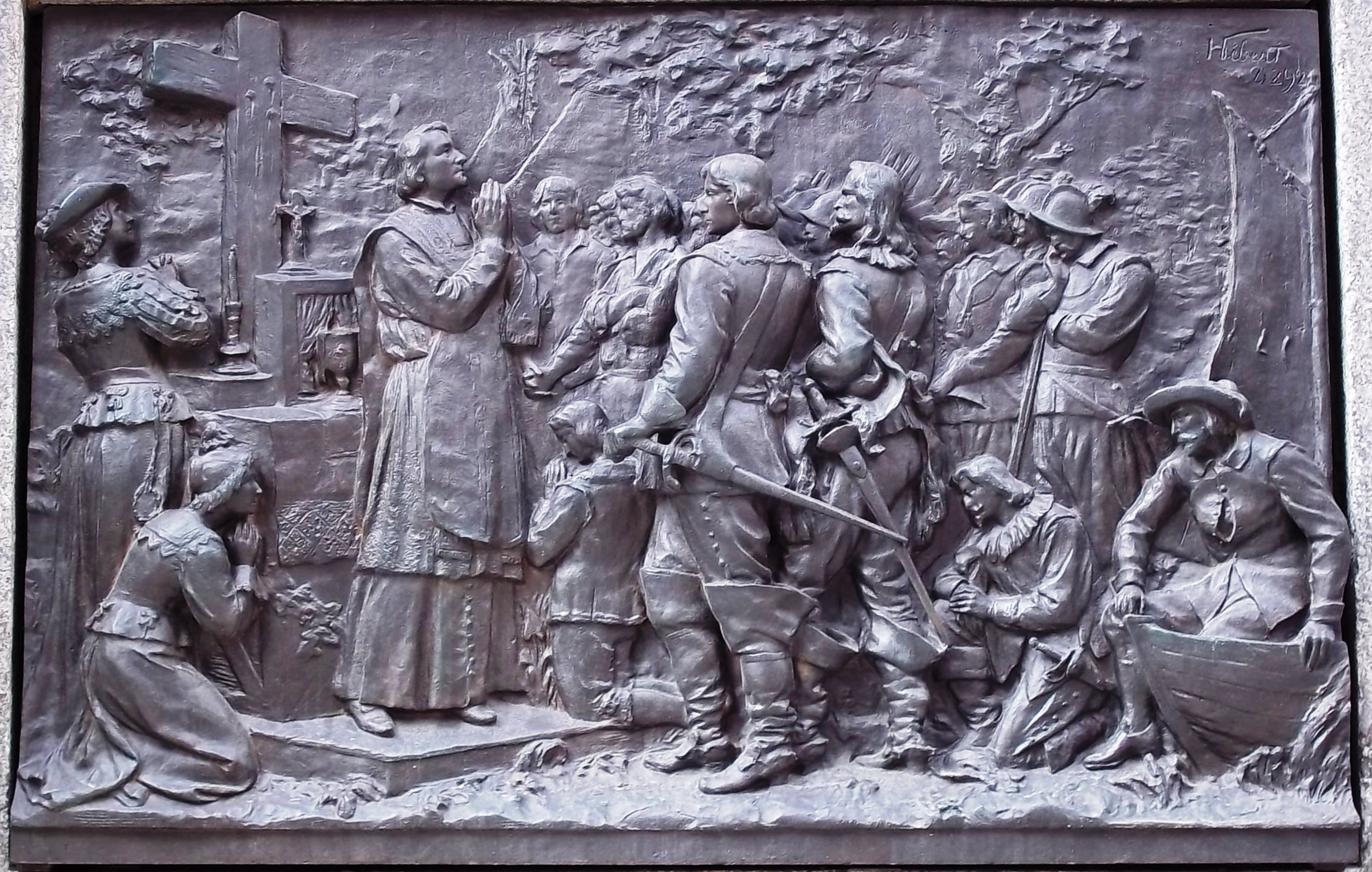
- Maisonneuve Monument: Vimont says first Mass in Ville Marie on May 18, 1642
- Born: January 1, 1594; Lisieux
- Died: July 13, 1667 (aged 73); Vannes
- Education: Collège at La Flèche (1615–18); Collège de Clermont, in Paris

Barthélemy Vimont (January 1, 1594 – July 13, 1667) was a French Jesuit missionary in New France, North America.

== Biography ==
Born at Lisieux, he entered the Society of Jesus at Rouen in 1613. After his novitiate, he studied philosophy at the Collège at La Flèche where he was a student of Énemond Massé, a Jesuit missionary newly returned from New France.

Father Vimont first arrived in North America as part of a flotilla of four ships and a bark commanded by Charles Daniel in August 1629. Caught in a storm off the Newfoundland Banks, the ships were scattered with one ship carrying Vimont and the Captain making it to Cape Breton Island. Fort Sainte Anne was established and Vimont began his missionary work but was recalled to France the following year.

In 1639, Father Vimont returned to the New World, this time to Quebec to become third superior of the Jesuit Mission in Canada, succeeding Father Paul Le Jeune. He functioned in that capacity in New France until 1645.

Vimont, a friend and admirer of Jean Nicolet, wrote the only contemporary account of Nicolet's 1634 voyage to the interior of North America (published in Paris in 1642). He had also arrived in New France with Marie-Madeline de Chauvigny de la Peltrie who was the secular foundress of the Ursulines of Quebec and Marie de l'Incarnation who was the Ursuline foundress.

He died at Vannes in 1667.
