= Angus MacAskill =

Strongman champion (1825–1863)

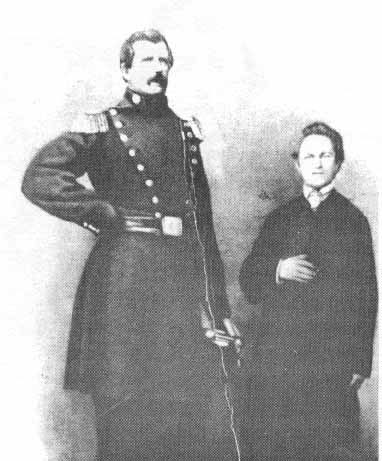
- Disputed photograph claimed by some sources to be of MacAskill
- Born: 1825; Berneray, North Uist, Scotland
- Died: 8 August 1863 (aged 37–38); St. Anns, Nova Scotia
- Cause of death: Brain fever
- Known for: Alleged feats of strength and height
- Height: 7 ft 9 in (2.36 m)

Angus MacAskill (1825 – 8 August 1863) was a Scottish giant. In its 1981 edition, the Guinness Book of World Records stated he was the strongest man, the tallest non-pathological giant and the largest true giant in recorded history at 7 feet 9 inches (2.36 m). If this claim is true, he would now be equal largest after Olivier Rioux matched his height in 2024. He was also claimed to have had the largest chest measurements of any non-obese man at 80 inches (203 cm).

== Early life ==
MacAskill was born in the hamlet of Sheabie on the island of Berneray, Uist in the Sound of Harris, Scotland. His father was Norman MacAskill, who was 5 feet 9 inches (1.75 m) tall, and his mother was Christina Campbell. He had twelve siblings, several of whom died young, and he was an ordinary-sized baby. After several years in Stornoway, Outer Hebrides, the family settled in the fishing community of Englishtown, Cape Breton Island, around 1831.

Young MacAskill was said to be of normal stature, but in entering his adolescence he began to grow rapidly and by his 20th year had attained 7 ft 4 in (2.24 m), eventually reaching 7 ft 9 in (2.36 m) within another year or two. His early adult weight was 425 pounds (193 kg). His shoulders were 44 inches (112 cm) wide, and the palm of his hand 8 inches (20.3 cm) wide and 12 inches (30.5 cm) long; his wrists were 13.5 inches (34.3 cm) in circumference; his ankles measured 18 inches (45.7 cm) in circumference; by 1863 he was wearing boots 17.5 inches (44.4 cm) long. His feet were probably around 16 inches (40.6 cm) long and 8 inches (20.3 cm) wide. He had "deep-set blue eyes and a musical, if somewhat hollow voice"; and "a mild and gentle manner." Despite his size, he was well proportioned.

He was known in his home community of St. Anns as "Gille Mòr" (translated to "Big Boy"). He was also known to many as the "Cape Breton Giant" or simply "Giant MacAskill".

When MacAskill was approximately 14 years old, he travelled on a fishing schooner from St. Anns to North Sydney, where the crew took him along to a dance. An altercation with a dancer led to MacAskill striking his tormentor's jaw with his fist. The man landed in the middle of the floor and was unconscious for so long the other dancers thought he was dead. When the captain returned to his schooner, he found MacAskill on his knees praying that he had not killed the man.

== Adult career ==
MacAskill has no verified feats of strength and many stories regarding this are subject to exaggeration and added speculation over time, some stories can't even agree where the event took place.

There are various accounts of an incident with an anchor that may have taken place in New York or New Orleans. French sailors apparently taunted MacAskill to lift an anchor lying on the wharf, which was estimated to weigh 2,200–2,700 pounds (998–1,220 kg). MacAskill easily did so and walked down the wharf with it, but one of the anchor's flukes caught in one of his shoulders, crippling him. However, this was not the cause of his death, as he lived for many years thereafter. MacAskill was rumoured to be able to carry barrels weighing over 350 pounds (160 kg) apiece under each arm or reputedly able to lift a hundredweight, i.e. 112 pounds (50.8 kg), with two fingers and hold it at arm's length for ten minutes.

In 1849, he entered show business and went to work for P. T. Barnum's circus, appearing next to General Tom Thumb. In 1853, he toured the West Indies and Cuba. Queen Victoria heard stories about MacAskill's great strength and invited him to appear before her to give a demonstration at Windsor Castle, after which she proclaimed him to be "the tallest, stoutest and strongest man to ever enter the palace", and presented him with two gold rings in appreciation.

The fishermen of St. Anns envied MacAskill's strength. While they laboriously bailed their boats, MacAskill set his weight under his two-ton boat, tipped it on its beam ends and reportedly emptied the bilge water. He reportedly single-handedly set a 40-foot (12.2 m) mast into a schooner. He was also said to have been able to lift a fully grown horse over a four-foot fence.

After a show business career demonstrating his size and strength in Europe and North America, he returned to his home community of Englishtown and purchased a gristmill, a general store and several other properties.

== Death ==
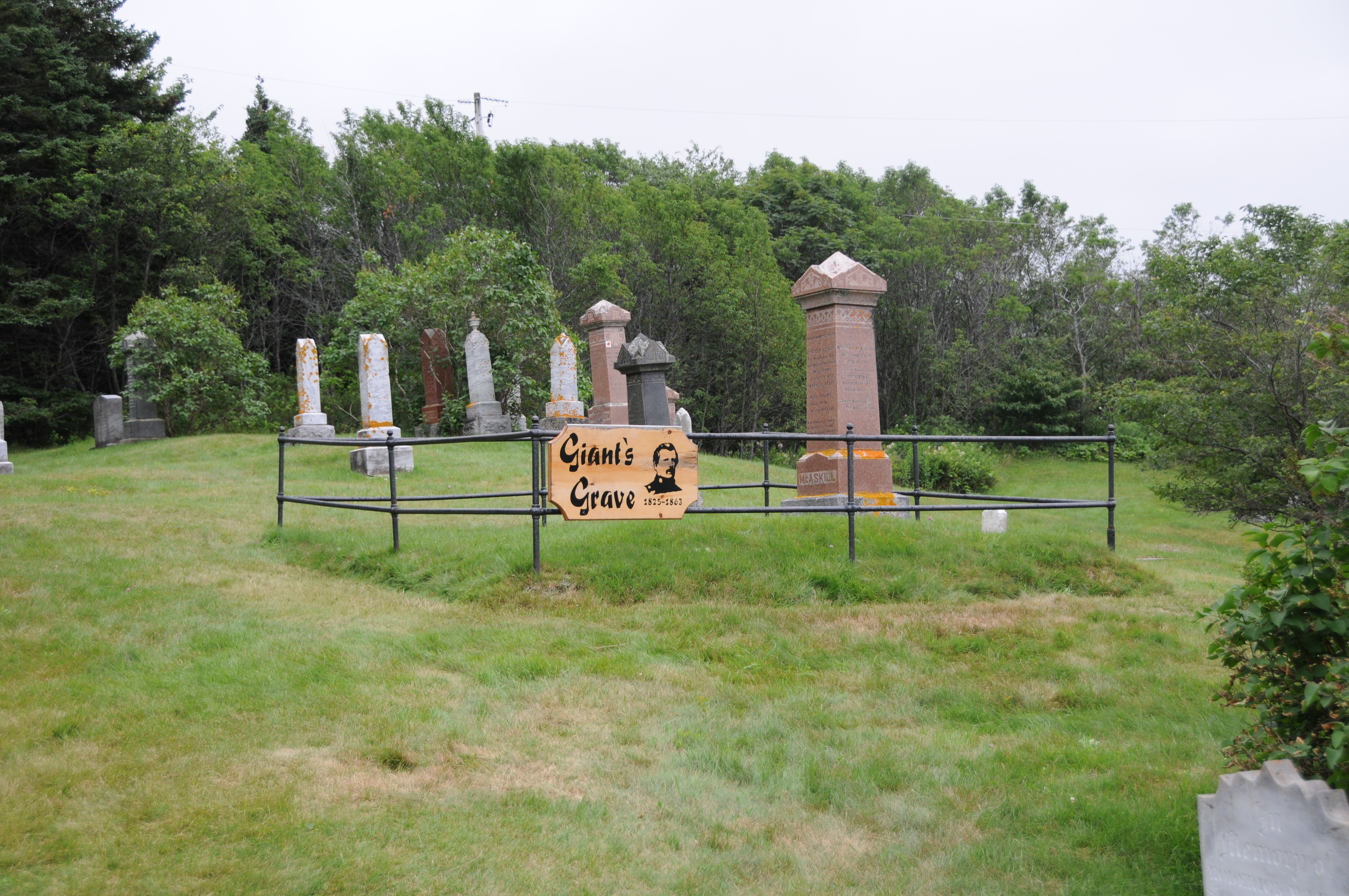
Angus MacAskill's grave on Cape Breton Island, Nova Scotia

In the summer of 1863, MacAskill undertook a trip to the colonial capital at Halifax, where he had been planning to sell produce and purchase stock for his store that he would need for the winter season from the city's wholesalers. During the trip, he suddenly became seriously ill and was returned to St. Anns, where his family moved him back to his parents' home. His original childhood bed was hastily lengthened and put up in their living room to provide for his care. The doctor's diagnosis was brain fever. After a week's illness, MacAskill died peacefully in his sleep on August 8, 1863, the Presbyterian minister the Rev. Abraham McIntosh and many neighbours being in attendance in the house.

The Halifax Acadian Recorder of August 15, 1863, reported that "the well-known giant... was by far the tallest man in Nova Scotia, perhaps in British America" and that "his mild and gentle manner endeared him to all who had the pleasure of his acquaintance". The whole county mourned and he was buried in the Englishtown Cemetery alongside his parents, who were of average size; the size of MacAskill's burial mound dwarfs those of his mother and father.

== Museum and legacy ==
MacAskill's presence lived on in Englishtown for many years as his timber-frame house sat on the edge of Kelly's Mountain, overlooking St. Anns Harbour. The structure, with its massive door frames, still stood, albeit in ruins, as late as the 1950s and the foundation was visible into the 1980s.

Around 1900, the Government of Nova Scotia replaced the family's original grave marker with a new one after the original had fallen into disrepair. Some of MacAskill's original personal effects from his house, including a bed frame, clothes and chair were removed for preservation and displayed for many years during the mid-20th century at the nearby Gaelic College of Celtic Arts and Crafts. These artifacts were moved back to Englishtown after the "Giant MacAskill Museum" was established in the late 1980s on a road-front portion of MacAskill's former property by the "Giant MacAskill Heirs Association". In addition to this collection, the Englishtown museum houses a more expanded collection of artifacts that had been maintained by family members.

The "Giant MacAskill Museum" was also established in 1989 at Dunvegan on the Isle of Skye and is operated there by a community group, this museum having several replicated artifacts from the Englishtown museum. It is managed by Peter MacAskill, father of the street trials cycle rider Danny MacAskill.

In 1977, the new vessel on the Englishtown Ferry, a cable ferry running across the 700-foot-wide (213 m) entrance to St. Anns Harbour between Englishtown and Jersey Cove, was christened as the Angus MacAskill. Despite the relatively short crossing, it became the busiest ferry service in Nova Scotia, carrying hundreds of thousands of vacationers and residents every year until its replacement in 2008 by the newly built vessel Torquil MacLean.

== See also ==
- Angus Graham (strongman)
- Donald Dinnie
- Stone put
- Western Isles Strongest man
