= St. Peters Canal =

Canal in Nova Scotia, Canada

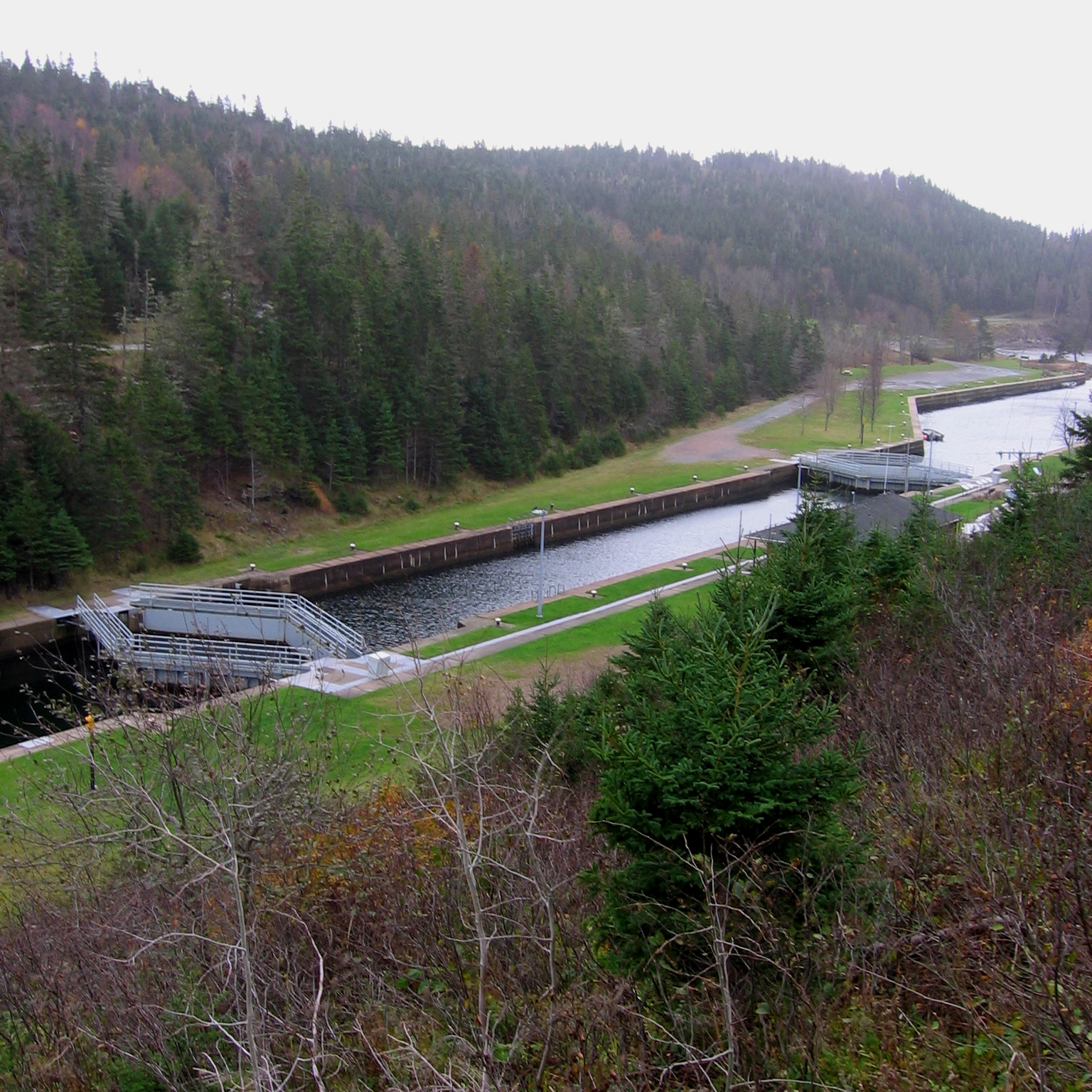
- The single lock in the canal features an unusual double-gate system used because each end of the canal (Atlantic Ocean and Bras d'Or Lake) has a different tidal regime.

- St. Peters Canal in Nova Scotia
- Country: Canada
- Coordinates: 45°39′19.5″N 60°52′6.85″W

Specifications
- Maximum boat length: 301 ft 0 in (91.74 m) (Regularly limited to 91.44 metres (300.0 ft))
- Maximum boat beam: 47 ft 0 in (14.3 m)
- Maximum boat draft: 16 feet (4.9 m)
- Maximum boat air draft: 105 feet (32 m)
- Locks: 1
- Status: Open
- Navigation authority: Parks Canada

History
- Construction began: 1854
- Date completed: 1869

Geography
- Start point: St. Peters Inlet of Bras d'Or Lake
- End point: St. Peters Bay of the Atlantic Ocean to the south

The St. Peters Canal is a small shipping canal located in eastern Canada on Cape Breton Island. It crosses an isthmus in the village of St. Peter's, Nova Scotia which connects St. Peters Inlet of Bras d'Or Lake to the north with St. Peters Bay of the Atlantic Ocean to the south.

In the vast majority of canals the flow of water is unidirectional. That is, the "high" side of the canal is always the same. St. Peter's Canal is unusual in that, due to the difference in the timing of the tides between Bras d'Or Lake and the ocean, during part of the tide cycle the Atlantic side is the higher, in other parts of the tide cycle it is the lake side. As a result, the canal requires special "double" gates, the only ones of their kind in North America. The usual canal lock has a gate at each end, each gate consisting of two swinging doors that when closed form a shallow 'V' shape, with the point of the 'V' pointing upstream. At the St. Peter's Canal lock each gate consists of four swinging doors which form a diamond shape when closed. In actual use the pair of doors which form the upstream pointing 'V' are used. No matter which side has the higher water level, either one pair or the other will be appropriate.

Vessels transiting the canal are limited by the size of the lock, which measures 91.44 m (300 ft) long, 14.45 m (47.4 ft) wide, 4.88 m (16 ft) draught and air draught of 32 m (105 ft). A swing bridge over the canal has 6 m (19.69 ft) of clearance when closed and is operated from the bridge house on Grenville Street.

St. Peters Canal is the only working canal of national historic significance in Atlantic Canada and an important historic landmark for the Village of St. Peter's and for Cape Breton Island. St. Peters Canal is part of a nationwide family of over 900 national historic sites, including 9 operating canals.

== History ==
The area had long been travelled by the Mi'kmaq people who portaged their canoes across the isthmus. A "haulover road" across the isthmus established by French fur trader Nicholas Denys in 1650 predated the canal.

A feasibility study was conducted in 1825 into the possibility of building a canal. Construction began in 1854 and was completed in 1869, resulting in a channel measuring 800 m (2,600 ft) long and an average of 30 m (100 ft) wide. The canal passes through a 20 m (66 ft) high hill composed of solid granite, accounting for the 15 years for its construction. There can be a tidal difference of up to 1.4 m (4.5 ft) between Bras d'Or Lake and the Atlantic Ocean, thus a lock was designed to regulate water levels. The original works were designed to take vessels of 4 m (13 ft) draft but were deepened to 5.5 m (18 ft) between 1875 and 1881.

The St. Peters Canal saw relatively heavy use by commercial shipping in the 19th century and early 20th century, during an era of industrial expansion on Cape Breton Island. Additions and renovations, widening the channel and lengthening the locks, continued until 1917. The canal eventually became too small for modern ships and has been used primarily by pleasure boats since the end of the Second World War. The canal continues to serve both pleasure craft and commercial vessels travelling to and from the Bras d’Or Lakes, with about 1,000 lockages recorded for the years 2003 and 2004. The canal was designated a National Historic Site of Canada in 1929 and was under the jurisdiction of the Federal Department of Railways and Canals and its successor, Transport Canada, up to 1972, when administration of the canal and associated property was transferred to Parks Canada, who continue to operate and maintain the site today. The Lockmaster's house built in 1876 is a "recognized" heritage building according to the Federal Heritage Building Review Office (FHBRO).

Parks Canada undertook a major project to restore both entrances to the canal in 1985. The St. Peters Canal is operational from May to October each year. The current swing bridge, installed in its present location in 2017, is the fifth bridge to span the canal; previous ones were installed in 1869, 1876, 1919 and 1931.

== Hours of operation ==
Prior to 2013, the canal operated from November 1 to mid-May, weather permitting, on a 24 hours' advance notice requirement. It operated seven days a week, from mid-May to mid-October each year, continuing with five-day-a-week operation (Monday to Friday) from mid-October to October 31. Through the early peak season (mid-June to mid-August) the canal was open for navigation from 8:00 am to 8:30 pm each day. The remainder of the peak season (mid-August to Labour Day) the hours were 8:00 am to 7:30 pm.

In 2013 season Parks Canada reduced service to three days a week from May 17 to Jun 23, expanding to seven days a week operation from June 24 to September 8 and two days a week operation from September 9 to 22 (extended to October 14, 2013). The daily hours of operation were also cut back, with closure at 6:00 pm each day until August 11 when the closing time fell back to 4:00 pm. St. Peter's Canal handles about 1,000 transits a year. By its own estimate, Parks Canada believed 15 per cent of those boaters would be affected by the reduced hours of operation. In December 2015 seven-day-a-week operation was restored to the May 10 to June 26, 2016 operation period.

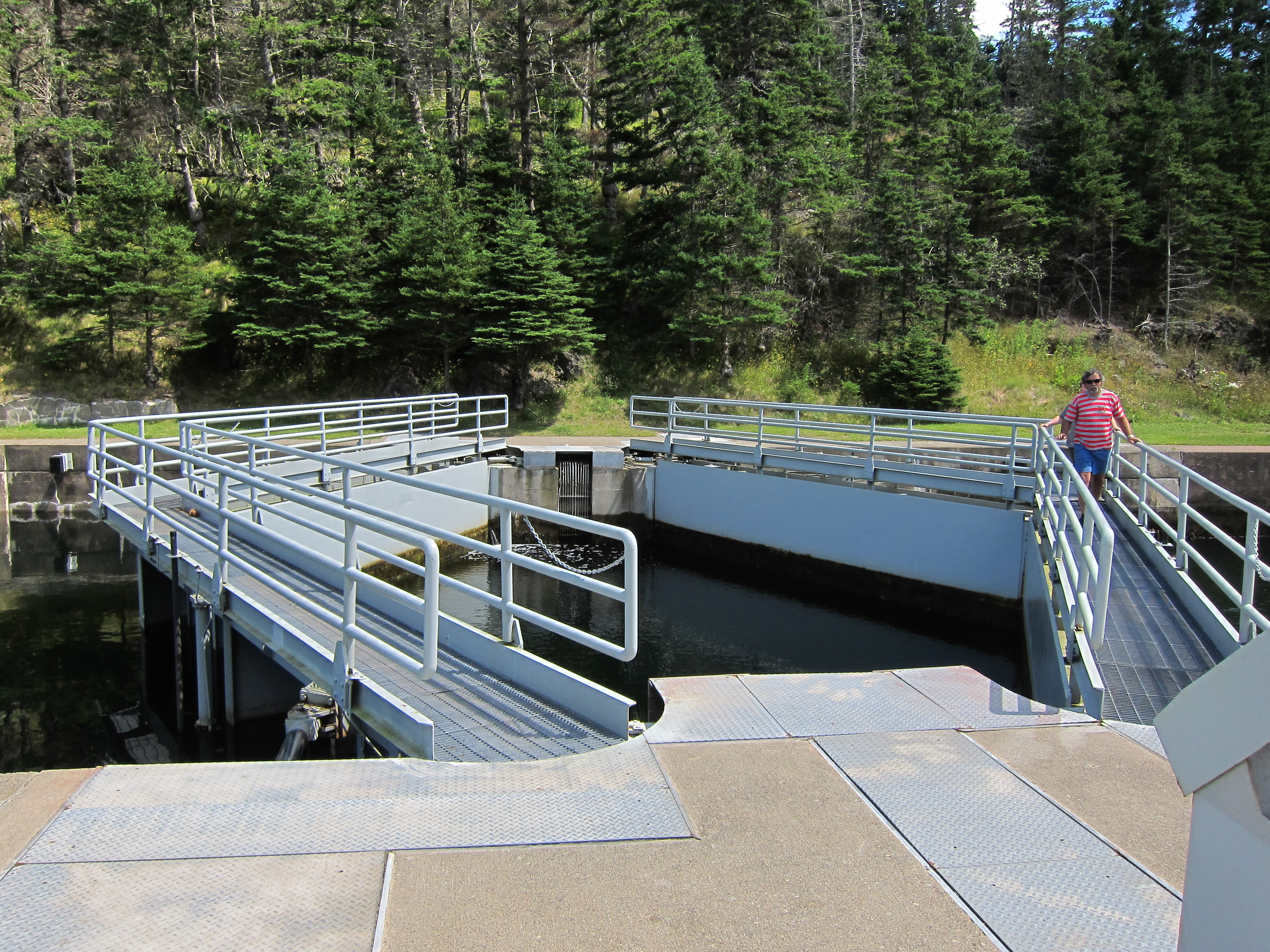
At the St. Peter's Canal lock each lock gate consists of four swinging doors which form a diamond shape when closed. In actual use the pair of doors which form the upstream pointing 'V' are used. No matter which side has the higher water level, either one pair or the other will be appropriate.

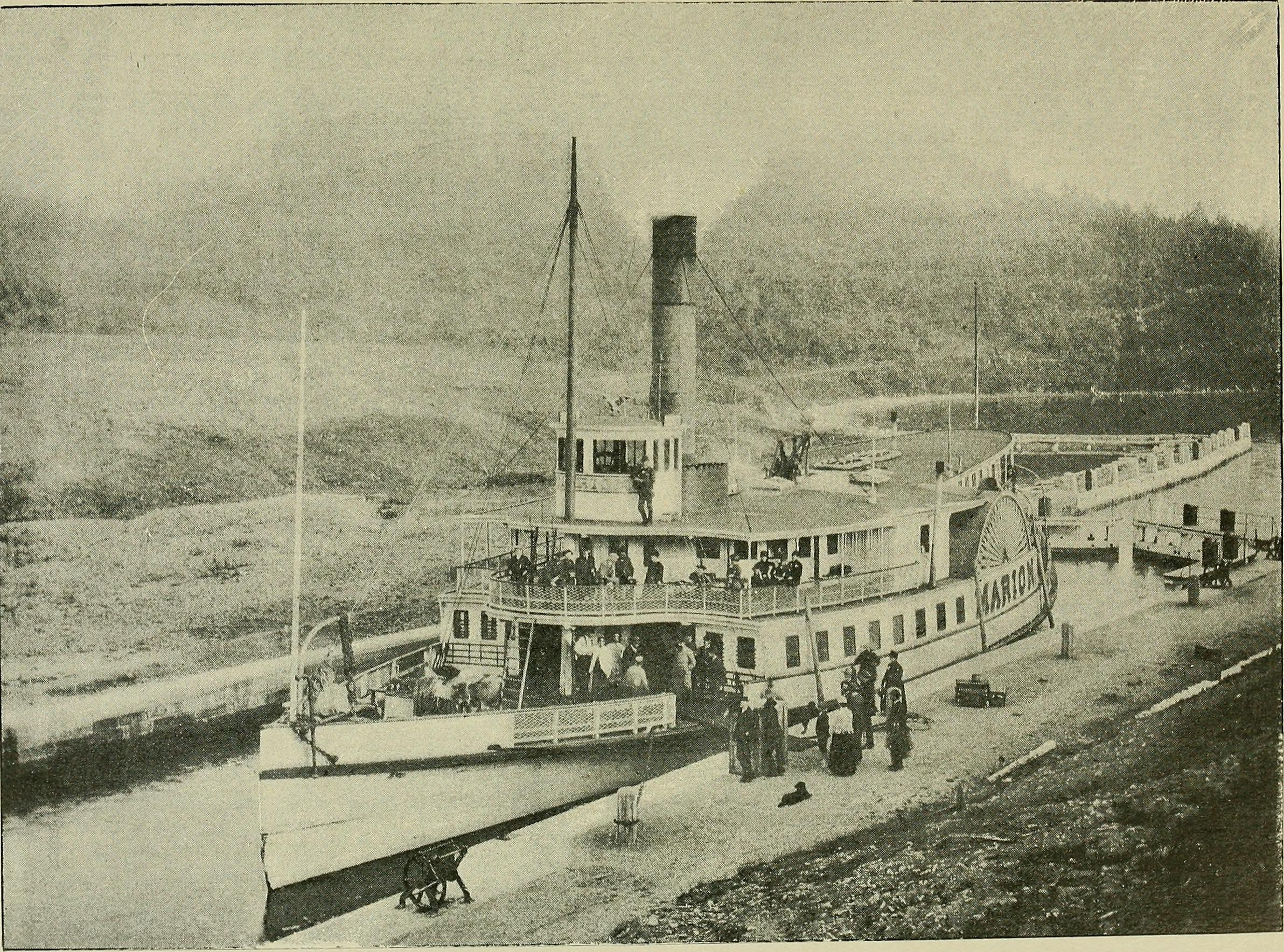
Steamer "Marion" Entering the First Locks on St. Peter's Canal, cir.1890

== Swing bridge replacement ==
The old one-lane swing bridge was constructed in 1936. The bridge was almost 80 years old and was nearing the end of its lifecycle. Routine inspections identified the bridge as needing some upgrades to meet current standards. Parks Canada considered continuing to perform repairs, but a full bridge replacement was deemed to be more cost effective. The old bridge still met all safety requirements and underwent regular bridge inspections to ensure public safety until it was replaced.

In August 2014 Public Works and Government Services Canada (PWGSC) issued a Notice of Preferred Procurement (NPP) for the design phase of a new swing bridge for the St. Peters Canal. According to Parks Canada external relations officer Maria O'Hearn, this step was the first in a three-year process that saw construction of a new two-lane swing bridge begin in 2016, with the new structure replacing the former one-lane bridge a year later. On 20 November 2014 this tender was awarded to Parsons Inc. of Gloucester, Ontario.

The project was estimated to cost $10 million (final cost closer to $16 million) and was overseen by Parks Canada, as the bridge is part of a national historic site. The new two-lane bridge was built adjacent to the existing one-lane structure. Contracts for the construction went out during the winter of 2016-2017 with the work beginning in March 2017. The new two-lane bridge opened slightly behind schedule to boat and vehicular traffic in mid-June 2017, with landscaping work to be completed during the summer that year. An official re-opening ceremony, with representatives of the Government of Canada, along with community members from St. Peter's and Potlotek First Nation, was held on November 16, 2017.

== Swim The Canal ==
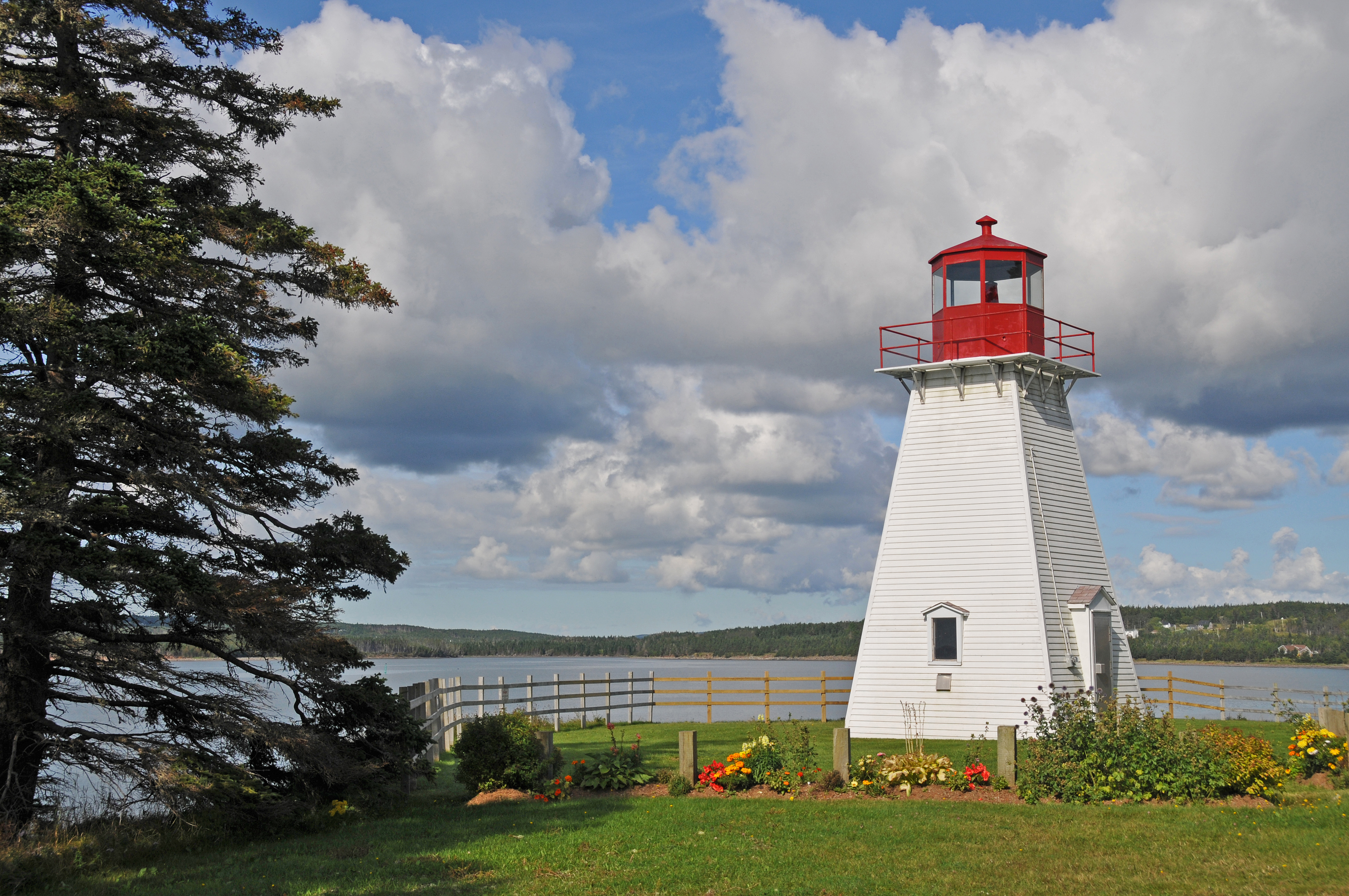
Jerome Point Lighthouse

The Swim The Canal event, part of the region’s Nicolas Denys Days, was launched in 2014.

The event has continued each year since 2014, only interrupted in 2020 and 2021 due to the COVID-19 pandemic, and is a fundraiser to support the volunteer activities of the Village on the Canal Association.

In 2018, 260 participants made their way down the 800-metre channel that connects the Bras d'Or Lake and the Atlantic Ocean.

The 2025 event saw 400 swimmers take part, reaching a goal and cap set by the organisers to ensure the safety of the participants.

It wasn’t just locals who swam. Marc Champagne and Annie-Claude Letendre, both from Whitehorse, Yukon, sought out the event as part of some time added ahead of a business trip.

“I have meetings in Halifax next week, and so we decided to tack on a few extra days and make a holiday of it,” Champagne said. “We’re both avid swimmers, and we were looking around for things we could do in the water, and we stumbled on this event. “It’s just awesome to see so many people out and enjoying the water, having a fun time swimming together.”
