= Nicolas Denys =

Governor of Acadia

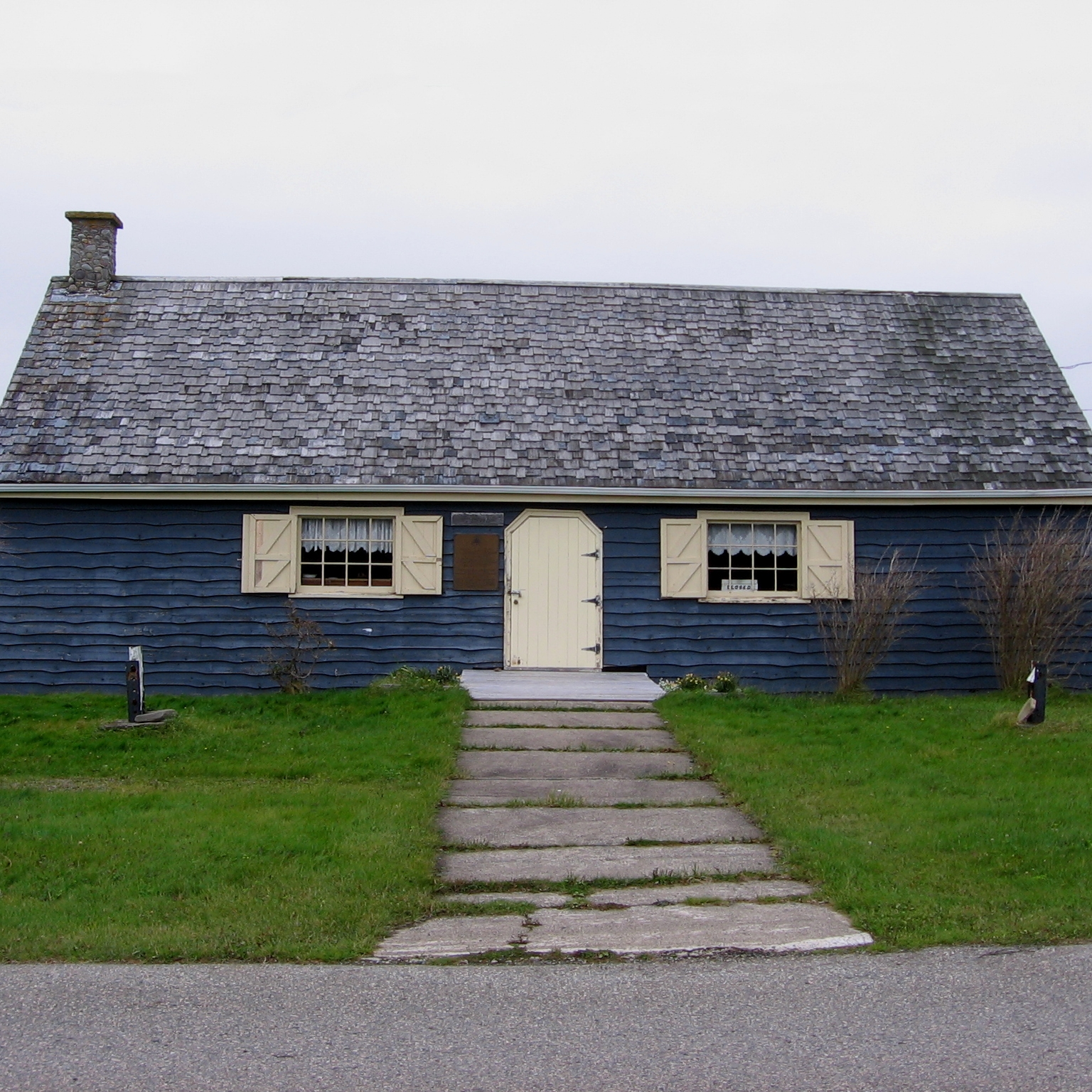
The Nicolas Denys Museum in St. Peters, Nova Scotia commemorates the life of the seventeenth century French merchant, governor, settler, and author. Designed to resemble Denys' sixteenth century dwelling and trading post, the structure was erected in 1967.

Nicolas Denys (1598? – 1688) was a French-born merchant, governor, writer, and settler in New France. He founded settlements at St. Pierre (now St. Peter's, Nova Scotia), Ste. Anne (Englishtown, Nova Scotia) and Nepisiquit (Bathurst, New Brunswick).

Denys' writings about the lands and peoples of Acadia were published in two volumes in 1672. The work, entitled The Description and Natural History of the Coasts of North America, remains the leading authority regarding the conditions of Acadia for the years 1632 through 1670.

== Life ==
=== Early years in France ===
Nicolas Denys was born in Tours, Indre-et-Loire, France, about 1598, (Note: See blupete.com among others, although porttoulouse.com isn’t as confident of this date.) the son of Jacques Denys, a captain in King Henri IV's Royal Guard and equerry to the king. His mother was Marie Cosnier. He was baptized in 1603.

=== Early years in Acadia ===
When Cardinal Richelieu authorized a stronger French presence in the New World, he commissioned Isaac de Razilly to be lieutenant-general of Acadia and Nicolas Denys accompanied the expedition as one of de Razilly's lieutenants. The expedition set sail in 1632 with 300 hand-picked men, supplies, six Franciscan missionaries, and Simon Denys (Denis) de La Trinité (1599–1678), brother of Nicolas Denys. Simon Denys was a future seigneurial attorney and receiver general for the Compagnie des Cent-Associés, who was appointed to the ruling Sovereign Council of New France in 1664, then ennobled by Louis XIV, in 1668.

They founded a colony at the LaHave River where Denys engaged in inshore fishing, lumbering and fur trading. French administrators, including nearby Port Royal's lord, the Sieur Charles de Menou d'Aulnay, thought little of the colonists’ reclaiming tidal marshlands. Denys was very impressed with the “great extent of meadows which the sea used to cover and which the Sieur d'Aulnay has drained”. It was this extensive system of dikes and drainage sluices (called aboiteaux) that set his colony apart from any others. It allowed the colonists to reclaim land that the Mi'kmaq nation had no use for. This greatly aided peaceful co-existence with their neighbors, and Mi’kmaq trade, friendship and intermarriage was and is an immensely important part of the Acadian identity and heritage.

When Denys arrived in 1632 the aboriginal community was already using iron kettles, axes, knives, and arrowheads, but few had firearms. Before the use of kettles the Mi’kmaq used hollowed out tree trunks in which to boil their unsalted food, dropping in hot stones to heat the water. Possessing kettles, they were free to move anywhere and became more mobile, changing their habitations often. Denys remarked on excessive hunting in his diaries. Moose, formerly in great numbers on Cape Breton Island, had been exterminated by hunting with muskets. There were no longer any moose on Prince Edward Island and the caribou were in reduced number. Alcohol, however, not over-hunting, was a major cause of Mi’kmaq decline.

When de Razilly died in December 1635 the colony broke up and Nicolas Denys returned temporarily to France. In 1636, Denys was granted a seignory by the French crown, apparently the third grant in the colony of Acadie, and in 1642 he married Marguerite de Lafitte in France, (Note: See blupete.com for the marriage and return voyage, but porttoulouse.com is more authoritative about the number and names of children resultant from the marriage.) but soon took his new family across to his adopted lands of Acadia.

Denys was a witness to one of the most unfortunate chapters of early Acadia's history: the rivalry between the Lords d’Aulnay and Charles de Saint-Étienne de la Tour, as it dissipated efforts to grow the colony. La Tour had claimed royal permission to ply the fur trade in the American Northeast. His rival outposts were in often-open hostility with the budding d’Aulnay colony, competing for resources and markets. Decades of sparring led to bloodshed. In the Spring of 1643 La Tour led a party of English mercenaries against the Acadian colony at Port Royal. His 270 Puritan and Huguenot troops killed three Acadians, burned a mill, slaughtered cattle and seized 18,000 livres' worth of furs. D'Aulnay retaliated in 1645 by seizing all of La Tour's possessions and outposts while La Tour was drumming up more support for his cause in the English colonial port of Boston. Denys’ letters and journals give vivid descriptions of the drama.

=== Governor ===
Once he secured rights to his own lands in Acadia through the Company of New France, Denys continued to seek his fortunes now as the Governor of Canso and Isle Royale (present-day Cape Breton Island). Denys founded settlements at St. Pierre (now St. Peter's, Nova Scotia, site of the Nicholas Denys Museum), Ste. Anne (Englishtown, Nova Scotia) and Nepisiquit (Bathurst, New Brunswick).

His 'fortunes' had some reversals, however. Sieur Emmanuel le Borgne, a rival with holdings at Port Royal, seized his properties by armed force in 1654 while Denys was at Ste. Anne. Later that year, King Louis XIV recognized Denys’ claims to the property lost to le Borgne, and Le Borgne was commanded to restore them to Denys.

The Denys family, including his wife and son Richard Denys, made their home in St. Pierre, and dwelt there in relative calm until the Winter of 1669, when Nicolas’ home and business were consumed in a fire. Denys relocated his family to Nepisiquit, on Baie Chaleur, just south of the Gaspé Peninsula, and there he turned his efforts to writing. Leaving his son Richard in charge of his holdings, he travelled to Paris to publish his Description Géographique et Historique des Costes de l’Amérique Septentrionale: avec l’Histoire Naturelle du Païs. Released in 1672, it was not a success. He remained in Paris for several years, returning impoverished to Nepisiguit a few years before his death.

== Legacy ==
Denys died in 1688 at Nepisiquit, a town of his own creation. During his tenure in the New World, he appears to have offered more stability of governance than those other royal appointees around him. Denys is well known through his writings about the lands and peoples of Acadia, especially his Description, published in two volumes in 1672. This work was edited and translated into English by Professor William Francis Ganong and published in 1908 as part of the Champlain Society's General Series. Ganong was a distant cousin of Denys.

Nicolas Denys and his work, translated as Description and Natural History of the Coasts of North America, remains the leading authority regarding the conditions of Acadia for the years 1632 through 1670.

== Falsified genealogies ==
There are numerous published genealogies on the Denys history that are unreliable. Noted genealogist Yves Drolet, in The Aryan Order of America and the College of Arms of Canada 1880 - 1937, discredited genealogies linking Nicolas Denys to Frederick Gilman Forsaith alias Frédéric Gregory Forsyth de Fronsac' alias Forsyth de Fronsac alias Viscount de Fronsac. Fraudulent lineages written by Forsaith (posing as Forsyth) and others have been widely distributed and used as reference in several books. One example includes the following fraudulent misinformation deleted from this article on July 10, 2017:

"Denys' daughter, Marguerite, married her cousin, James Forsyth, who was a captain in naval and land expeditions. Marguerite and James had their own daughter, Margaret, who in turn married another cousin, Walter Forsyth, a regent of the University of Glasgow and titular Baron of Dykes. Their children inherited from their mother's family the shipping and private armed vessels which were their part in the Forsyth and Denys enterprises on the seas, the same extending even to the French and British Americas and Indies. The Forsyths were in alliance with the Normans of France, favoring the Stuart cause in Scotland, and opposed to English control."

Marguerite, the daughter of Nicolas Denys and Marguerite Lafitte, died in 1654, unwed, at the innocent age of eight. As Forsyth, he also crafted a false descendancy from John Erskine, Earl of Mar. Other Forsyth publications by Forsaith containing false genealogies include:

- Memorial of the family of Forsyth de Fronsac
- A genealogical record : Forsyth of Nydie
- Rise of the United Empire Loyalists: A Sketch of American History

Another author, once a widely respected professional genealogist, Charles Henry Browning, also perpetuated Forsaith's false Denys relationship, as well as other false lineages. Browning was a member of the Aryan Order of America (1880–1937), which was founded by Forsaith, under his alias, Forsyth. Some of Browning's false lineages are included in Americans of Royal Descent.
