= Angus Graham (strongman) =

British strongman

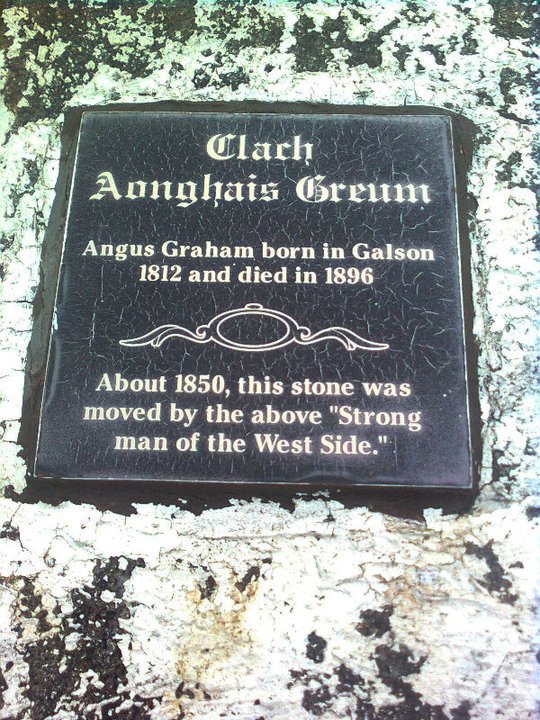
Strongman Angus Graham Memorial Plaque

Angus Graham (Aonghas Greumach) (c. 1812 – 1896) was a strongman born on the Isle of Lewis, Scotland, and died at Habost in the Port of Ness. Throughout life Angus achieved a name for himself as a man of outstanding physical strength. He was widely reported to be the strongest man on Lewis and possibly Britain. His incredible feats of strength have become folklore on the island, one being the rolling of a large boulder which is still to be seen on the Barvas moor in Lewis. The large boulder, possibly weighing more than a ton, was moved by Angus when he was around 40 years old. In recent times, the boulder has been painted white, by someone wishing to ensure that the stone was not forgotten. This stone is marked by a commemorative plaque which was unveiled by Kenneth John Mackay, chairman of the Angus Graham Stone Committee, celebrating the strength of Angus Graham.

Many anecdotes still in circulation are based on his reputation as the strongest man in Lewis, sometimes getting confused with the feats of the other famous Hebridean strongman Angus MacAskill (who also lived in the Western Isles, upon the Isle of Berneray).

== See also ==
- Angus MacAskill
- Donald Dinnie
- Stone put
- Hammer toss
- Weight for Distance
- Weight for Height
- Sheaf toss
- Western Isles Strongest man
