= Antoine Daniel =

French Jesuit missionary and martyr (1601-1648)

Saint Antoine Daniel SJ
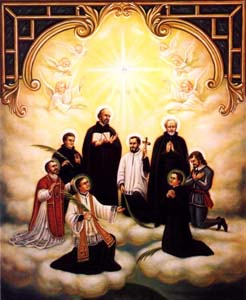
- North American Martyrs holy card, c. 1930

Missionary, Martyr
- Born: 27 May 1601; Dieppe, Normandy, France
- Died: 4 July 1648 (aged 47); Teanaustaye, Pays d'en Haut, Canada, New France
- Canonized: 29 June 1930 by Pope Pius XI
- Feast: 19 October (outside Canada); 26 September (Canada)

Antoine Daniel (French pronunciation: [ɑ̃twan danjɛl]; 27 May 1601 – 4 July 1648) was a French Jesuit missionary in North America, at Sainte-Marie among the Hurons, and one of the eight Canadian Martyrs.

== Life ==
Daniel was born at Dieppe, in Normandy, on 27 May 1601. After two years' study of philosophy and one year of law, Daniel entered the Society of Jesus in Rouen on 1 October 1621. He was a teacher of junior classes at the Collège in Rouen from 1623 to 1627. In 1627 he was sent to the College of Clermont in Paris to study theology. In 1630, Daniel was ordained to the priesthood. He then taught at the College at Eu.

In 1632, Daniel and Ambroise Davost set sail for New France. Daniel's brother Charles was a sea-captain in the employ of the De Caen Company of France, representing Protestant-Huguenot interests. Captain Daniel had a French fort on Cape Breton Island in 1629. They arrived at St. Anne's Bay, Cape Breton, where the two Jesuits remained for a year ministering to the French who had settled there.

In the spring of 1633, Daniel and Davost joined Captain Morieult on his way to Quebec, and arrived there on 24 June. Davost stopped at Tadoussac on the way, a French trading settlement at the confluence of the Taddoussac and St. Lawrence rivers.

In 1634 Daniel travelled to Wendake with Jean de Brébeuf and Daoust. Daniel studied the Wendat (Huron) language and made rapid progress. He translated the Lord's Prayer, the Creed and other prayers into the Wendat native tongue and set them to music. For two years, in what is now Quebec, he had charge of a school for Indian boys. He returned to Wendake in 1638 to relieve Brébeuf at the new mission.

He returned to Teanaostaye, the chief town of the Wendat, in July 1648. Shortly thereafter on 4 July, the Haudenosaunee made a sudden attack on the mission while most of the Wendat men were away in Quebec trading. The priest rallied the defenders. Before the palisades had been scaled, he hurried to the chapel where the women, children, and old men were gathered. He gave them general absolution and, immersing his handkerchief in a bowl of water, he shook it over them, baptizing the catechumens by aspersion.

Daniel, still in his vestments, took up a cross and walked toward the advancing Haudenosaunee. The Haudenosaunee halted for a moment, then fired on him. They put Daniel's body into the chapel, which they had set on fire. Many of the Wendat escaped during this incident.

Daniel was the first martyr of the missionaries to the Wendat. Father Ragueneau, his superior, wrote of him in a letter to the Superior General of the Jesuits as "a truly remarkable man, humble, obedient, united with God, of never failing patience and indomitable courage in adversity."

== Veneration ==
Daniel and seven other martyrs were canonized by Pope Pius XI on 29 June 1930. The liturgical celebration of the Holy Martyrs of Canada takes place on 26 September in Canada and 19 October in the universal Church.

St. Anthony Daniel Roman Catholic church and parish, Kitchener, Ontario, is named for him. Elementary schools in Victoria Harbour, Ontario and Willowdale, Ontario are also named after the saint.

== See also ==
- Canadian Martyrs
- Jesuit missions in North America

== Sources ==
- Attwater, Donald and Catherine Rachel John. The Penguin Dictionary of Saints. 3rd edition. New York: Penguin Books, 1993. ISBN 0-14-051312-4.
