= Fort Sainte Anne (Nova Scotia) =

Fort on Cape Breton Island, Nova Scotia

Coordinates: 46°17′14″N 60°32′25″W

Fort Ste. Anne in Nova Scotia

Fort Ste. Anne is a former French military fort located at present-day Englishtown, Nova Scotia, on the Island of Cape Breton, Nova Scotia, Canada.

The fort was built by Captain Charles Daniel (1629) after he raided Baleine. The fort was occupied from 1639 to 1641.

Fort Saint Anne is a National Historic Site.

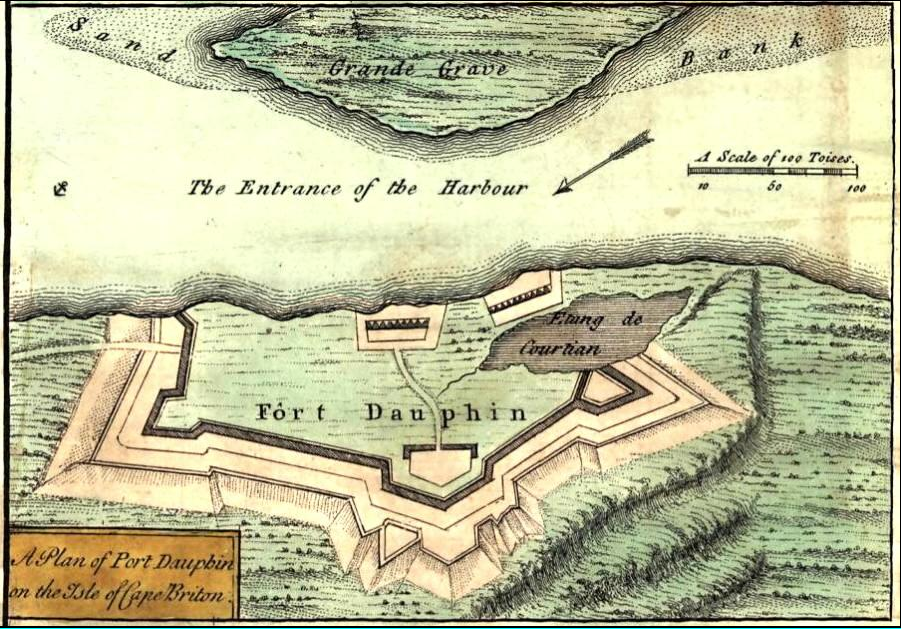
Fort Dauphin, 1755

== Associated Forts ==
Two other military forts were eventually built adjacent to the fort: Simon Denys Fort (1650-1659) and Fort Dauphin (1713-1758).

=== Fort Dauphin ===
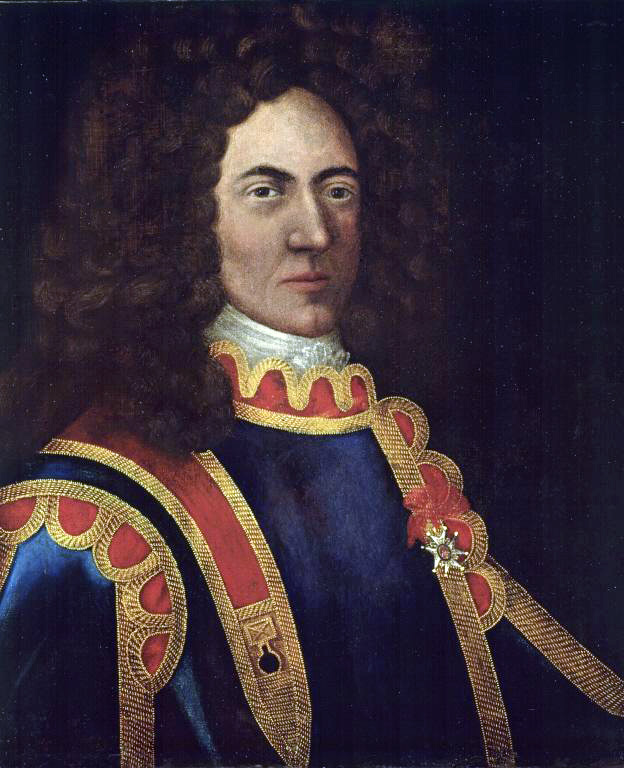
Jean-Baptiste Hertel de Rouville - established Fort Dauphin - buried at Fort, 1722

After Queen Anne's War, French officer Jean-Baptiste Hertel de Rouville and others established Fort Dauphin in 1713 as the capital of Ile Royale, prior to the establishment of Louisbourg. De Rouville played a role in the early settlement of both present-day Englishtown (1719-1722) and St. Peter's (1713-1718).

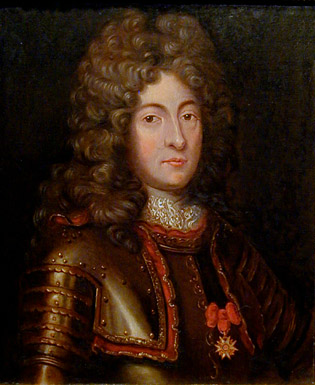
Philippe de Pastour de Costebelle - died at Fort Dauphin, 1717

As commodore of the fleet, Edward Tyng led 13 armed vessels and about 90 transports in the successful Siege of Louisbourg (1745). He participated in the Capture of the Vigilant and the destruction of Port Dauphin (Englishtown) in June 1745, burning 40 houses and an equal number of vessels.
