= Emmanuel Le Borgne =

Governor of Acadia and Seigneur of Port Royal

Emmanuel Le Borgne de Belle-Isle (1610 – 5 August 1675) was the governor of Acadia in 1657–67 and was the claimant to the estate of Charles de Menou d'Aulnay who had governed Acadia until his death.

Le Borgne was a highly successful merchant in France and had financed d’Aulnay in his Acadian trade. When d’Aulnay died by drowning, Le Borgne laid formal claim to the estate. He then sent an expedition to Acadia the next year to attempt a monopoly of the trade and secure the money owed to him. His youngest son, Alexandre Le Borgne de Belle-Isle, acted as governor temporarily, ahead of his father's arrival to Acadia.

His competition was Charles de Saint-Étienne de la Tour at Saint John (whose daughter, Marie, was, in 1668, wed to his son, Alexandre) and another former governor of Acadia, Nicolas Denys, at Cape Breton.

In 1653, along with raiding Pentagouet (Castine, Maine), LaHave, Nova Scotia, and Nipisguit (Bathurst, New Brunswick), Emmanuel Le Borgne, with 100 men, also raided Saint-Pierre. Denys was taken prisoner and returned to France.
