= Englishtown, Nova Scotia =

Community in Nova Scotia, Canada

Englishtown in Nova Scotia

Englishtown is an unincorporated area in the Municipality of the County of Victoria, Nova Scotia, Canada. It is the site of the Englishtown Ferry cable ferry that carries Nova Scotia Route 312 across St. Anns Harbour.

The area was known as Mohagadecek by the Miꞌkmaq. It is one of the oldest colonial settlements in North America, having been established as a French fishing port in 1597. In 1629, Charles Daniel constructed Fort Sainte Anne, the first French fortification in Île-Royale. It was the site of the first Jesuit mission in North America. Along with St. Peter's, Nova Scotia, it was the only settlement on Ile Royale prior to Louisbourg. The French also knew it as Grand Cibou, and Port Dauphin. It was called Baile nan Gall (Town of the English) in Scottish Gaelic. After 1669 there were no (European) inhabitants in the area for the next 50 years.

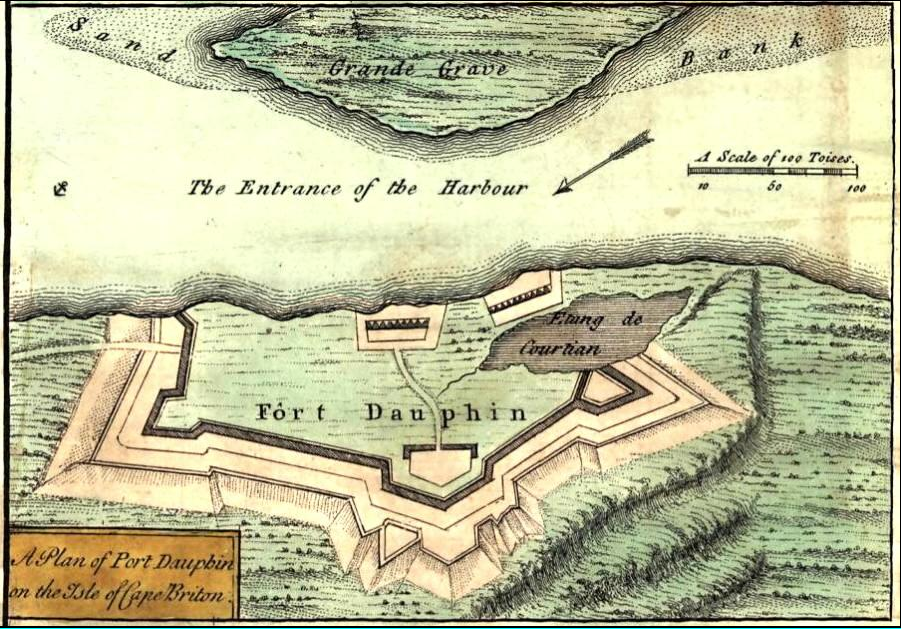
Fort Dauphin, 1755

Settlers arrive in the late 1700s. Little is known about them since their immediate descendants emigrated in search of better conditions.

A well-known resident from the 1800s was giant Angus McAskill.

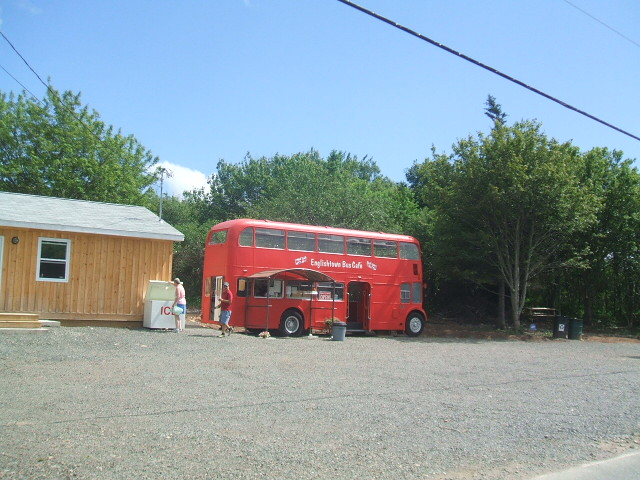
An Englishtown take-out, converted from a double-decker bus
