= Englishtown Ferry =

Ferry in Nova Scotia, Canada

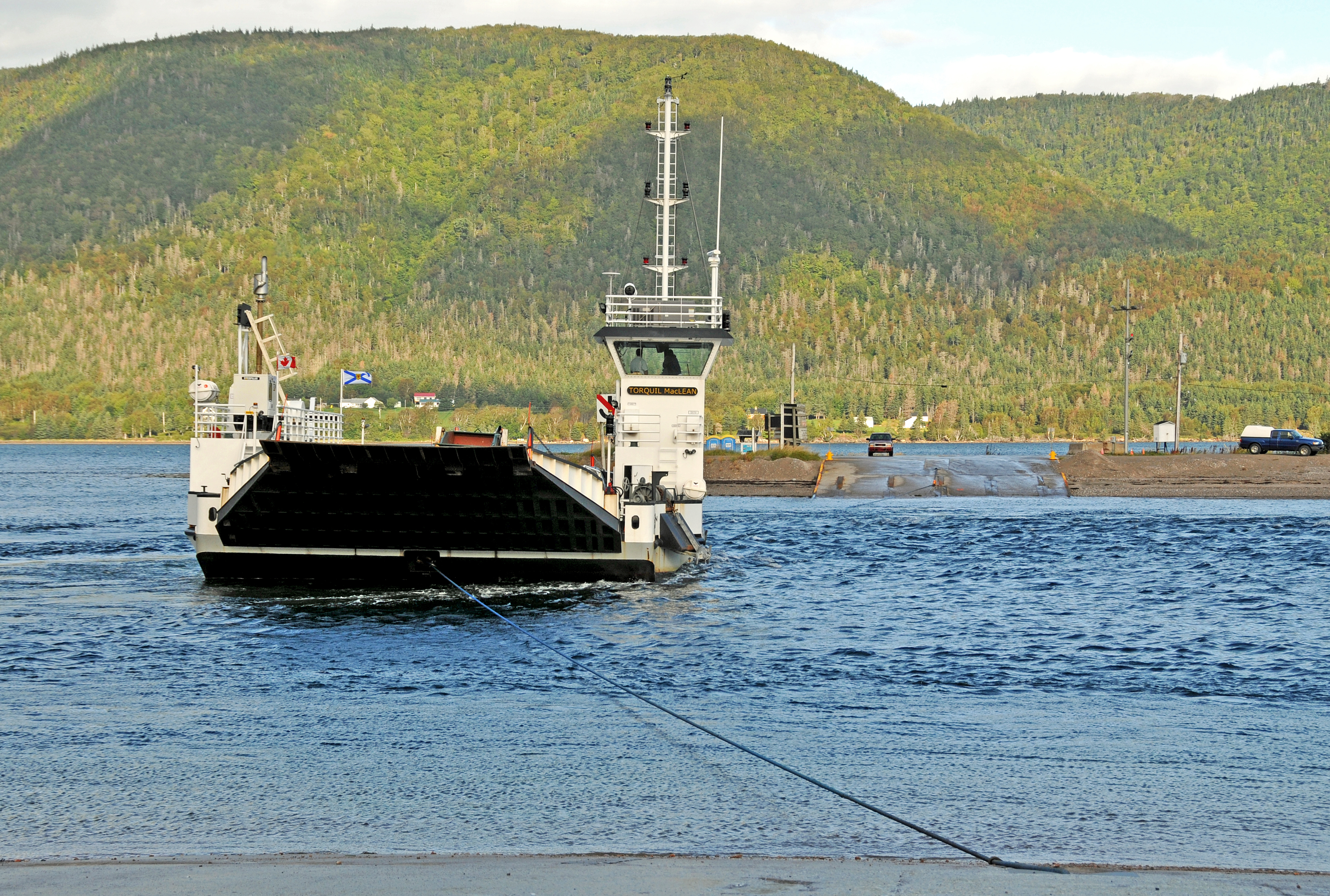
- The Torquil MacLean (Englishtown Ferry), approaching Englishtown, with the Jersey Cove terminal in the background.
- Locale: Englishtown, Nova Scotia
- Waterway: St. Ann's Bay
- Transit type: Diesel / Hydraulic Cable Ferry
- Route: Nova Scotia Route 312
- Carries: Motor vehicles, bicycles, pedestrians
- Terminals: 2
- Operator: Department of Transportation and Infrastructure Renewal (Nova Scotia)
- Travel time: ~3 minutes
- Frequency: 50/50
- No. of vessels: 1 (Torquil MacLean)
- Daily vehicles: up to 600

The Englishtown Ferry is a cable ferry carrying Nova Scotia Route 312 across the mouth of St. Ann's Bay. The ferry route runs 24 hours a day, on demand, and takes only a few minutes to cross the 125-metre-wide (410 ft) channel. On 25 March 2013, an 81-year-old man was killed after driving his car off the end of the ferry during boarding and plunging into the cold, swiftly-moving waters.

In 2014, the province of Nova Scotia, operator of the ferry, announced that it was investigating the economic implications of replacing the ferry with a bridge.
