= Jean-Baptiste Hertel de Rouville =

French colonial military officer

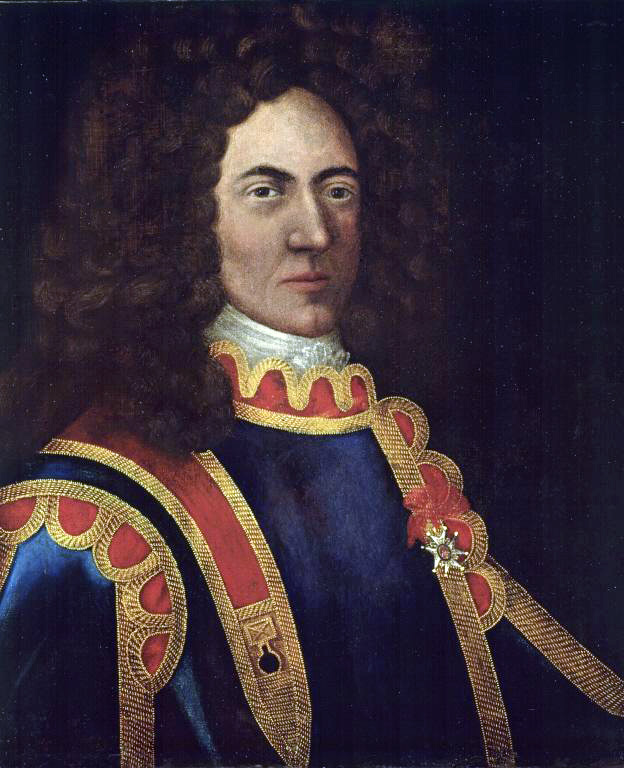
- Born: 26 October 1668; Trois-Rivières, New France
- Died: 30 June 1722 (aged 53); Fort Dauphin, Île-Royale (New France)
- Military career
- Allegiance: Kingdom of France
- Service years: 1676–1722
- Rank: Ensign 1694; Brevet Lieutenant 1696; Lieutenant 1706; Captain 1712; Commandant of Fort Dauphin 1719
- Conflicts: King William's War; Raid on Salmon Falls; Battle of Quebec; Queen Anne's War; Raid on Deerfield; Siege of St. John's; Raid on Haverhill
- Awards: Order of Saint Louis

Jean-Baptiste Hertel de Rouville (26 October 1668 – 30 June 1722) was a colonial military officer of New France in the French Marines in Canada. He is best known in North America for leading the raid on Deerfield, in the western Province of Massachusetts Bay, against English settlers on 29 February 1704 during Queen Anne's War.

A dedicated soldier, he was widely reviled by the settlers of New England for his tactics of raiding poorly defended frontier settlements. During the years of this war, he also participated in military operations against the English in Newfoundland. He played a role in the early settlement of Île-Royale (present-day Cape Breton Island), after that war.

== King William's War ==
Hertel de Rouville was born in 1668 into a military family in Trois-Rivières, in the colony of Canada, New France. He was the third son of Joseph-François Hertel de la Fresnière (1642—1722), also born in Trois-Rivières, and his wife. Active in the French Marines in Canada from an early age, Hertel served with his father during a 1687 French military operation against the Seneca tribe, which occupied much of present-day western New York. The attack was led by Governor of New France Jacques-René de Brisay de Denonville, Marquis de Denonville.

During King William's War, Hertel was among the defenders against English colonists and their Indian allies during the 1690 Battle of Quebec. He was granted the seigneury of Rouville at Mont-Saint-Hilaire in 1694.

== Queen Anne's War ==
During Queen Anne's War, also conducted against the English, Hertel led his first significant independent expedition, the Raid on Deerfield (1704). At the head of a force composed mainly of Abenaki, Huron (Wyandot), and Mohawk (Iroquois) warriors, but also a company of Canadian militia, he took the men south in late February to the English Province of Massachusetts Bay and descended on the lightly defended frontier town of Deerfield in the western part of the colony. The raiders achieved surprise, killing 54 settlers and taking more than 100 prisoners. The prisoners, including women and children, were taken on the long overland trek to Quebec, where many were adopted by Catholic Mohawk at Kahnawake, a mission village south of Montreal.

Later in 1704 Hertel de Rouville was sent to Newfoundland, where he participated in offensive operations against St. John's and other English communities. In 1708 he was at the head of an expedition with ambitious goals, but because he was unable to attract Indian allies, he completed only a single raid on Haverhill, Massachusetts. For the rest of Queen Anne's War, he continued to lead similar raiding operations. One of his English opponents described him as "an officer of great courage, but pre-eminently cruel and vindictive."

== Île-Royale ==
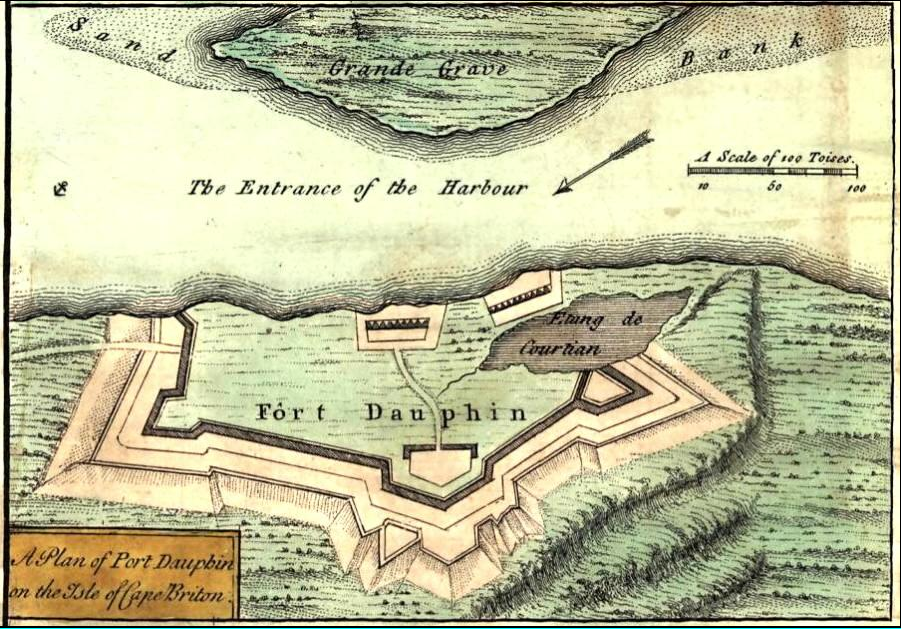
Fort Dauphin

After Queen Anne's War ended in 1713, Hertel de Rouville was sent to Île-Royale (present-day Cape Breton Island) to scout sites for new French settlements. Based on his recommendations, Fort Dauphin (present-day Englishtown, Nova Scotia) was selected for an initial settlement, and Hertel de Rouville supervised its construction. He was awarded the Order of Saint Louis in 1721. He died the following year on Île-Royale while serving as commandant of Fort Dauphin.

He was twice married. He had two sons who distinguished themselves in military service to New France.
