= Charles Daniel (sea captain) =

Charles Daniel (died 1661) was a merchant from Dieppe, and an early contributor to the advancement of the settlement of New France. One of his documented accomplishments was the founding of Fort Sainte Anne on Cape Breton Island. This took place in 1629 after the captain's ship had been involved in a gale which separated this ship from three others in the flotilla. One passenger, Father Barthélemy Vimont was the chaplain and an early Jesuit missionary to the region.

He was a member of Samuel de Champlain's Compagnie des Cent-Associés, which was a business enterprise created at a time when all territories explored by the French and seized as a part of the French colonial empire were the property of the King of France. The King, in turn, granted rights to individuals who would settle and otherwise solidify the possession for France. Daniel dropped out of this company in 1632 and joined another which was developing Cape Breton.

He was active in the area for only about ten years since he was almost constantly on official naval service for France.

The town of Port-Daniel–Gascons is named after him.

== See also ==
- Antoine Daniel - brother of Charles and Canadian martyr
