= Nova Scotia Route 223 =

Highway in Nova Scotia, Canada

Route 223

Route information
- Maintained by Nova Scotia Department of Transportation and Infrastructure Renewal
- Length: 72 km (45 mi)

Major junctions
- West end: Hwy 105 (TCH) in North Side Whycocomagh Bay
- Route 216 in Christmas Island; Hwy 125 in Leitches Creek Station
- East end: Route 305 in Leitches Creek Station

Location
- Country: Canada
- Province: Nova Scotia
- Counties: Cape Breton Regional Municipality

Highway system
- Provincial highways in Nova Scotia; 100-series
← Route 221	→ Route 224

Route 223 is a collector road in the Canadian province of Nova Scotia.

It is located on Cape Breton Island and runs from Leitches Creek Station at Route 305 to North Side Whycocomagh Bay at Highway 105.

The highway crosses Bras d'Or Lake twice, first at the Barra Strait where the Barra Strait Bridge links Iona and Grand Narrows (until 1993 this was served by a ferry), and then at St. Patrick's Channel using the Little Narrows cable ferry.

== Communities ==
- North Side Whycocomagh Bay
- Little Narrows
- Ottawa Brook
- Jamesville
- Iona
- Grand Narrows
- Christmas Island
- Big Brook
- Big Beach
- Shunacadie
- Glasgow
- Cross Point
- Beaver Cove
- Boisdale
- Ironville
- Leitches Creek
- Leitches Creek Station

== Parks ==
- MacCormack Provincial Park
- Barachois Provincial Park

== History ==
The entirety Collector Highway 223 was once designated as Trunk Highway 23.

== See also ==
- List of Nova Scotia provincial highways
