= Big Beach, Nova Scotia =

Community on Cape Breton Island, Canada

Coordinates: 46°0′24.26″N 60°40′49.47″W

Big Beach in Nova Scotia

Big Beach (Tràigh Mhòr in Gaelic, pronounced "try vohr") is a community located on the north side of the Boisdale Hills on the east side of the Great Bras D'Or Lake on Provincial Route 223, which runs from Leitches Creek to Little Narrows, through Central Cape Breton Island in the Canadian province of Nova Scotia. Located on the "Bras D'Or Lakes Scenic Drive" it is part of the Cape Breton Regional Municipality in Central Cape Breton Island.

At the time comprising the three small communities of Big Beach, Glasgow, and Big Brook, Big Beach was populated during the first half of the 19th century by Scots from the Outer Hebrides islands, specifically the Isle of Barra, as well as Benbecula and other islands in that chain, which are located off the Atlantic coast of Scotland.

The Canadian National Railway came through Central Cape Breton and Big Beach in the latter part of the 19th century, bringing a connection to the rest of North America. The railroad is still in operation, run by the Cape Breton and Central Nova Scotia Railway. "Section Men" were hired to maintain sections of the track. It was a coveted job. Many men cut timber for rail ties to subsidize their income.

There was a rail spur to the beach at one time when a company from Belgium gathered sand to make porcelain china.
