= Grand Narrows Bridge =

Canadian railway bridge

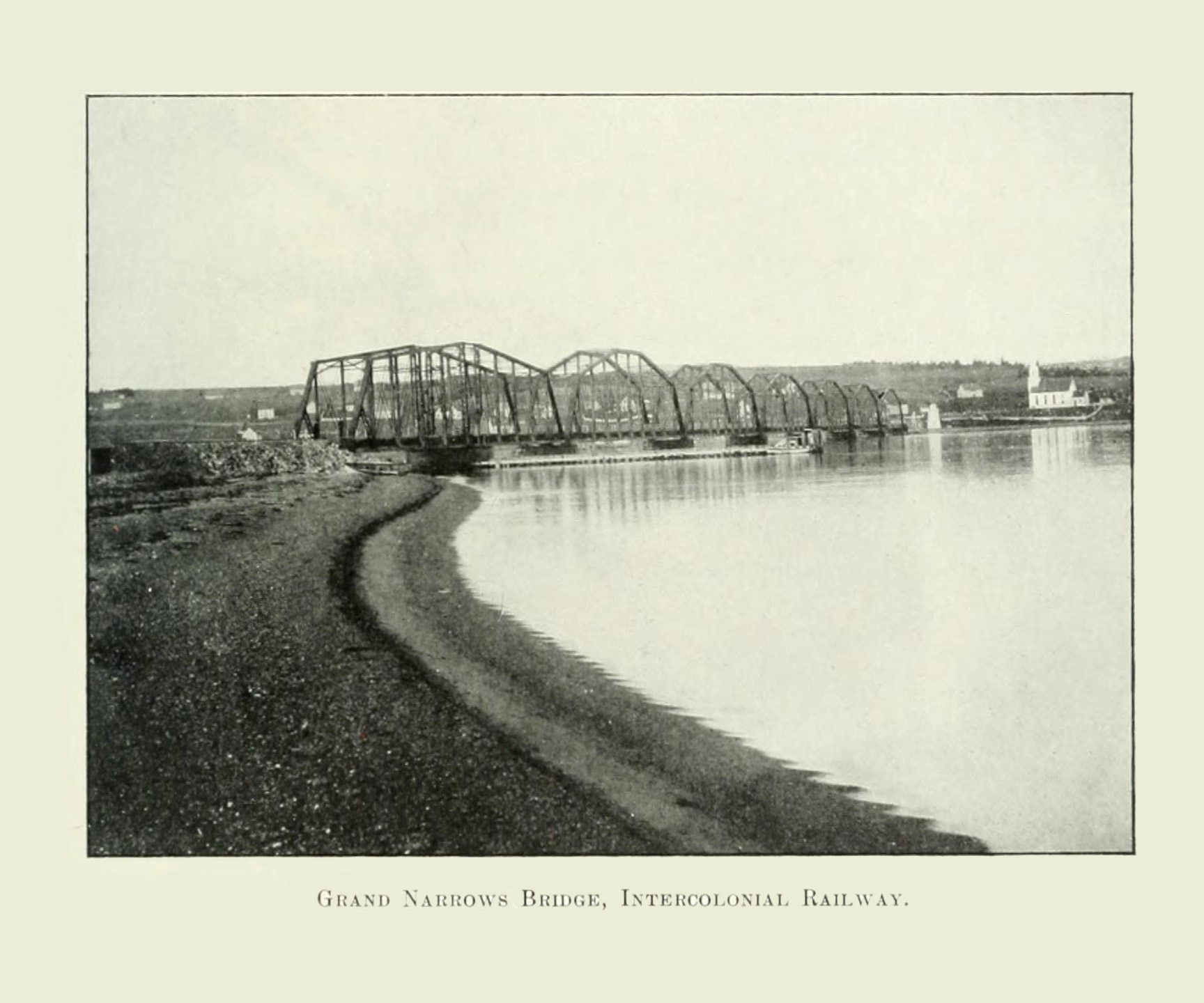
- Grand Narrows Bridge in 1900
- Coordinates: 45°57′35.75″N 60°48′1.03″W
- Carries: 1 rail line (Cape Breton and Central Nova Scotia Railway)
- Crosses: Bras d'Or Lake at the Barra Strait
- Locale: Cape Breton Island (Iona, Victoria County, Nova Scotia – Grand Narrows, Cape Breton Regional Municipality)
- Official name: Grand Narrows Bridge
- Other name: Barra Strait Railway Bridge
- Maintained by: Cape Breton and Central Nova Scotia Railway

Characteristics
- Design: Truss bridge
- Material: Steel
- Pier construction: Stone
- Total length: 516.33 m (1,694 ft)
- Width: 1 rail line
- Longest span: 73.76 m (242.0 ft)
- No. of spans: 7
- Piers in water: 6

History
- Constructed by: Isbester and Reid
- Fabrication by: Dominion Bridge Company
- Construction start: 1887
- Construction cost: $530,000
- Opened: 18 October 1890

Location
- Interactive map of Grand Narrows Bridge

The Grand Narrows Bridge is a Canadian railway bridge crossing between Victoria County, Nova Scotia, and Cape Breton County. At 516.33 m (1,694 ft), it is the longest railroad bridge in the province. The bridge incorporates a swing span at its eastern end to permit the continued passage of marine traffic through the strait.

It is an arch truss design, consisting of seven riveted steel trusses, each 73.76 metres (242 ft) long, set on cut stone piers. The Grand Narrows Bridge crosses the Barra Strait of Bras d'Or Lake, carrying the Sydney Subdivision of the Cape Breton and Central Nova Scotia Railway (CBNS) between Iona, Victoria County, on the West side, and Grand Narrows, Cape Breton County (Cape Breton Regional Municipality) on the east side.

In 1993, a double leaf bascule bridge, the Barra Strait Bridge, carrying Route 223, was constructed just 70 m (230 ft) to the northeast of the Grand Narrows Bridge. The Government of Nova Scotia had operated a small ferry service for motor vehicles across the strait, starting in 1847, and continued for the next 146 years, which was replaced in October 1993 by the opening of the Barra Strait Bridge.

== Construction ==
In 1887 the firm of Isbester and Reid contracted to build the foundations of a bridge at Grand Narrows, Cape Breton, and a 46-mile stretch of the Intercolonial Railway between the narrows and Point Tupper, near Port Hawkesbury.

Work was under way by 1889 when one of the principals of the firm, Robert Gillespie Reid, arrived on site and spent some three weeks testing sea bed sediments and measuring the currents running through the Barra Strait. This was necessary as the strait is deep, over 50 metres (164 ft) deep at its southern end and still over 28 metres (92 ft) deep at the site chosen for the new bridge at the northern limit of the strait between Uniacke Point to the west and Kelly Point to the east. Other complicating factors in the construction of the bridge were the very strong, erratic tidal currents in the strait, overburden on the bedrock, and the presence of ice during the winter and spring breakup.

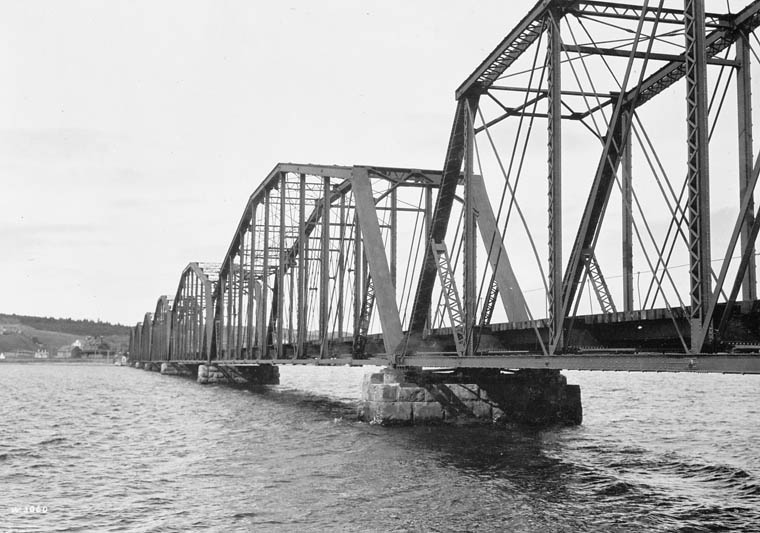
I.C.R. Bridge, Grand Narrows Cape Breton, N.S. circa 1909

While the actual length of this structure was not extraordinary, at around seventeen hundred feet, the actual process of laying the masonry foundation was.

Cofferdams, made of timber, were built on shore, ballasted, and floated out into the channel. These were then sunk in the locations where the bridge piers were to be built and sections were added to the tops until the dams reached from the surface to the bottom of the channel, resting on the floor of the strait. The dams were heavily ballasted around their outer walls, then pumped dry so excavation of the overburden could begin. Once bedrock was reached a flat area was quarried out and long anchor bolts were sunk into the rock below.

The seven cut stone bridge piers were then constructed inside the cofferdams, starting from bedrock, building up to a level about 4 or 5 feet above the surface of the water in the strait.

The bridge trusses had been prefabricated in Montreal by the Dominion Bridge Company, and were shipped to Grand Narrows. An iron forge was set up on the site for the express purpose of producing rivets, and assembly of the trusses was started, first onshore, and then completed on scows floating in the water. These completed trusses were then floated out into the strait, jacked up and lowered into their positions on the bridge piers.

R.G. Reid built the Grand Narrows Bridge for the Intercolonial Railway for $530,000.

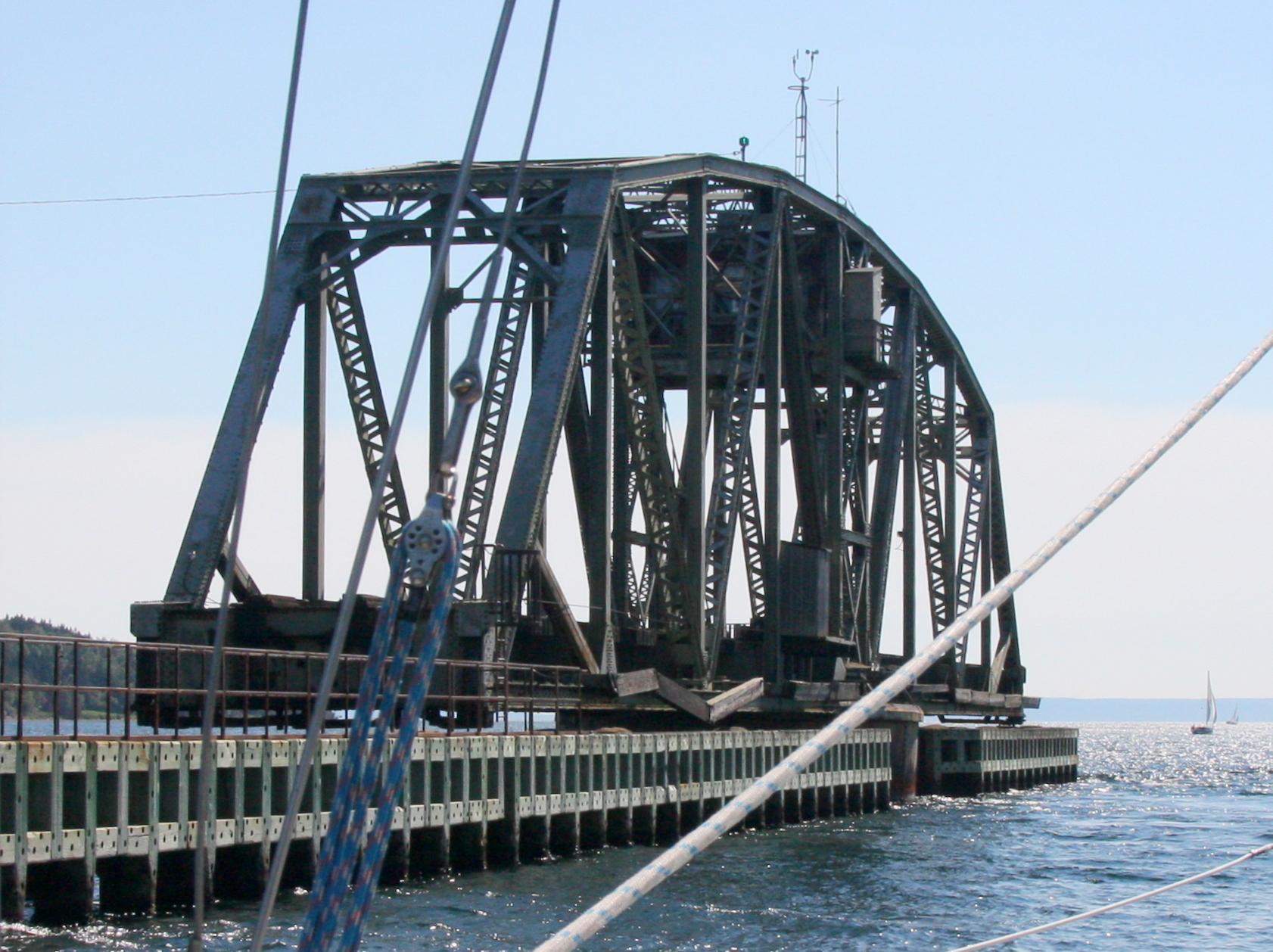
Swing Span at the east end of the Grand Narrows Bridge open to permit the passage of marine traffic. The bridge operator's cabin is visible in the top of the bridge arch.

== Official opening ==
At midnight on 18 October 1890, the five-car special train of Governor General Lord Stanley left Halifax, and arrived at Mulgrave in the early morning. The five cars were ferried across the Strait of Canso, and reassembled into a train at Point Tupper, with the Intercolonial Railway Company's locomotive #166 in front. At Iona, Lord Stanley (best remembered as the donor of hockey's Stanley Cup) formally declared the railway to Sydney open for traffic, and then himself drove the train across the Grand Narrows bridge. The official train reached Sydney at 7:10 pm, touching off celebrations that lasted well into the night.

== 1915 Truss upgrade ==
By the time of the first World War, as rolling stock on the Sydney Subdivision had continually been getting heavier, it was determined the bridge needed to be upgraded to handle the loads. In 1915 A contract was issued and the spans were replaced, again by Isbester and Reid, with heavier, stronger ones using a method similar to the original placements. Rail traffic was not interrupted for more than 8 hours at a time during the changeover.

== Marine traffic ==
Marine traffic through the Barra Strait has been logged since 1991, and has consistently ranged between 1700 and 2100 boats passing through the swing and bascule bridges each year, with a peak of 2100 passages recorded for 2002. Of these movements, an estimated 2% are commercial activity, 8% are government and 90% are recreational.

When the swing span is opened for marine traffic the resulting channel is 31.7 m (104 ft) wide and 7.6 m (25 ft) deep. While the Barra Strait is considerably deeper at the bridges, channel depth is limited to 7.6 m (25 ft) by the presence of the wreck of the Zealandia which rests on the bottom of the strait, lying directly across the channel passage through the bridges. The Zealandia was originally built as a 3 masted, full-rigged clipper with an iron hull by C. Connell and Co. in Glasgow in 1869. She was later converted to a barge and used to carry dolomite to the Dominion Iron and Steel Company steel plant in Sydney. In July 1916 the Zealandia broke her tow during a gale and sank after crashing into the Barra Strait railway bridge. The wreck is 220 ft long by 40 ft wide and at the stern, it rises 30 ft off the bottom.

On 30 December 2014 Genesee & Wyoming, the operators of the Cape Breton and Central Nova Scotia Railway (CBNS), ceased rail service on Sydney Subdivision of the line. At that time the Grand Narrows Bridge was swung into the open position and has remained open ever since.

== Uncertain future ==
The subdivision of the railway carried by the Grand Narrows Bridge ceased operations at the end of 2014 and it is uncertain if the bridge will ever carry rail traffic in the future. A study conducted for the Port of Sydney Development Corporation, carried out by Hatch Ltd, concluded that at minimum, $12,400,000 worth of work was required to put the bridge back in service at a minimum Class 1 standard, limiting rail traffic crossing the bridge to a maximum of only 16 km/h (10 mph). Part of the expected work required would include a complete refit of the bridge's electrical and mechanical systems. Bringing the bridge back up to a Class 3 standard (65 km/h (40 mph)) would cost considerably more.

== See also ==
- List of bridges in Canada
