= Barra Strait =

- Grand Narrows
- Taawitk (Mi'kmaq)
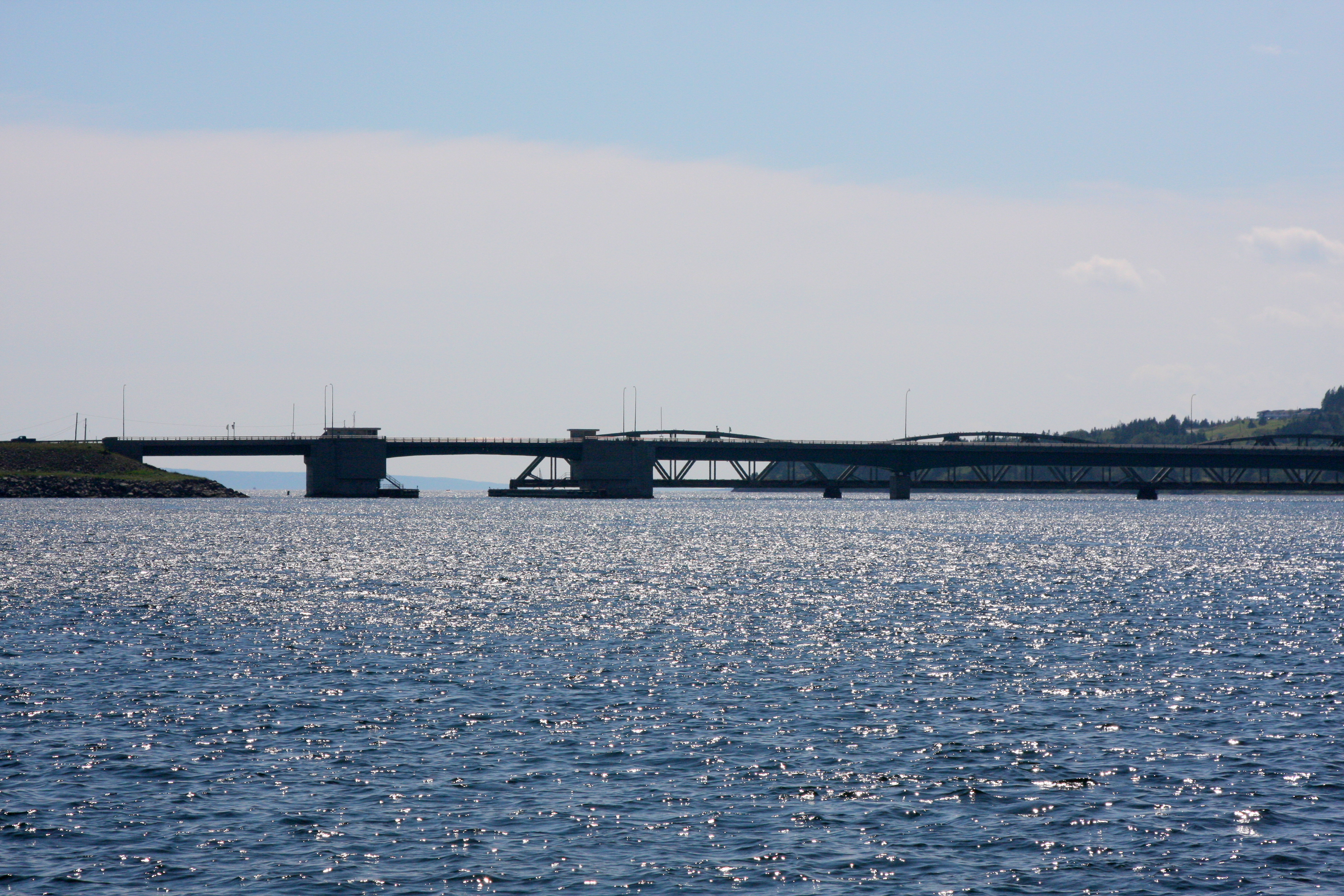
- Barra Strait and Bridges from the North

- Barra Strait in Nova Scotia Barra Strait (Canada)
- Location: Cape Breton Island, Nova Scotia
- Coordinates: 45°57′09″N 60°48′15″W
- Type: Channel
- Part of: Bras d'Or Lake
- Ocean/sea sources: Gulf of Saint Lawrence, Atlantic Ocean
- Basin countries: Canada
- Max. length: 1.2 nautical miles (2.2 km; 1.4 mi)
- Max. width: 0.66 nautical miles (1.22 km; 0.76 mi)
- Max. depth: 50 metres (160 ft)
- Settlements: Grand Narrows & Iona
- References: Geographical Names of Canada - Barra Strait

The Barra Strait is a 1.22 km (0.76 mi) wide channel located in the Canadian province of Nova Scotia. It connects the northern and southern basins of Bras d'Or Lake, an inland saltwater body that dominates the centre of Cape Breton Island. The border between two of Cape Breton Island's counties runs through the strait; the community of Grand Narrows, in Cape Breton County, is situated on the eastern shore while the community of Iona, in Victoria County is situated on the western shore.

== Grand Narrows ==
The Mi'kmaq name for the strait was Taawitk, "where the water flows out." An early descriptive name for the strait, Grand Narrows, has persisted as the name of the neighbouring community on the east bank and as the name of the railroad bridge over the Strait. "Grand" to distinguish it from the "Little Narrows," on the same Bras d'Or Lake. The Grand Narrows was also known, as far as the Strait is concerned, as the "Barra Strait." This after the Sound of Barra on the Isle of Barra in the Scottish Hebrides, where most of the settlers in this neighbourhood came from about the year 1802. The name, "Barra Strait" was approved November 2, 1950.

== Transportation ==
The opening of the St. Peters Canal in 1869 saw the Barra Strait become part of a sheltered coastal shipping route between Sydney and the Strait of Canso for sailing and steam powered vessels. Vessels transiting this route are only limited by the size of the lock in the St. Peters Canal, which measures 91.44 metres (300.0 ft) long, 14.45 metres (47.4 ft) wide, and 4.88 metres (16.0 ft) draught.

Boat traffic through the Barra Strait has been logged since 1991, and has consistently ranged between 1700 and 2100 boats passing through the swing and bascule bridges each year, with a peak of 2100 passages recorded for 2002. Of these movements, an estimated 2% are commercial activity, 8% are government and 90% are recreational.

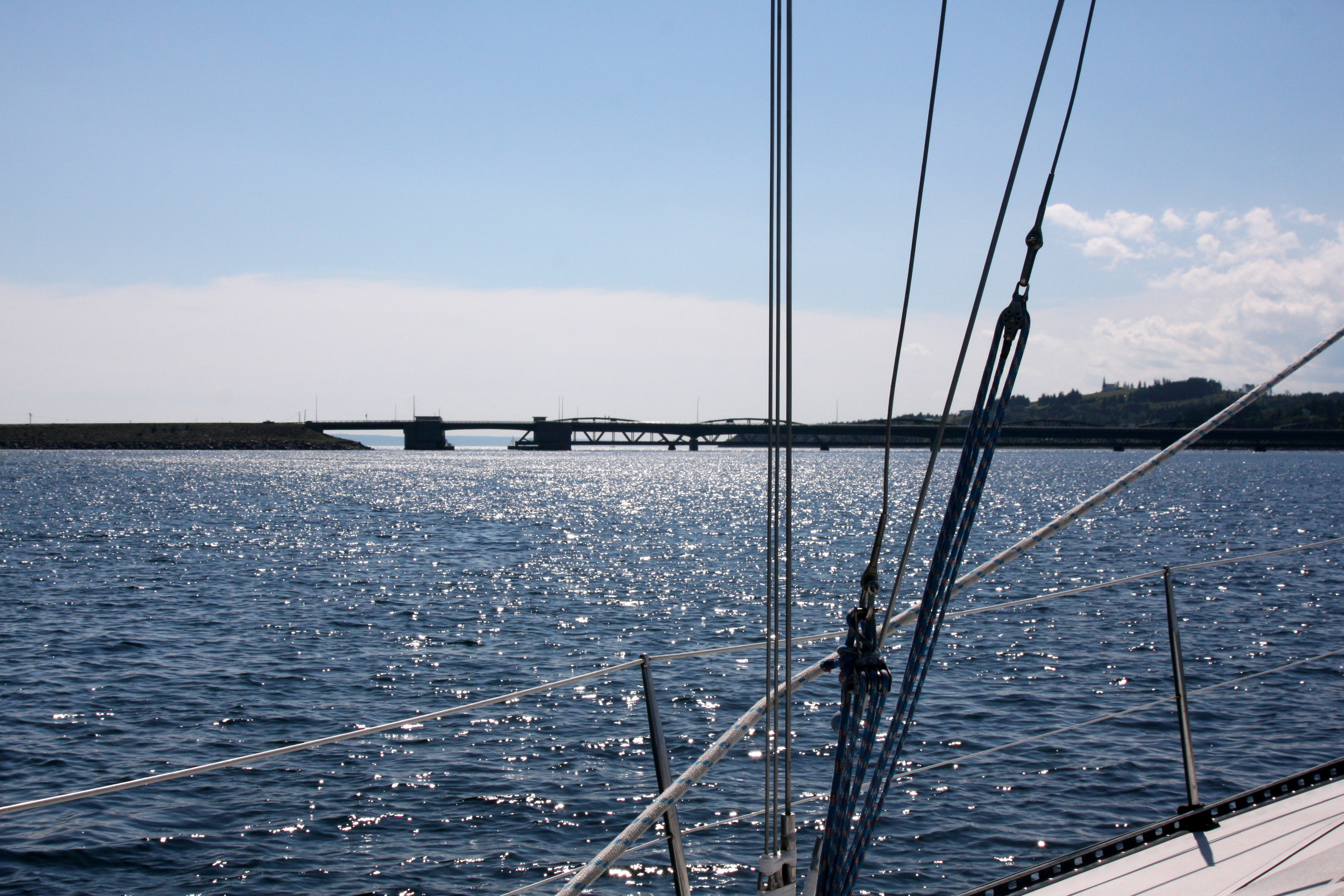
Approaching the Barra Strait and its bridges from the north. In the foreground is Barra Strait Bridge. Behind it (with the arched spans) is the Grand Narrows Bridge.

== The bridges ==
In the late 1880s the Intercolonial Railway of Canada bridged the strait with the Grand Narrows Bridge (also known as the Barra Strait Railway Bridge), the longest railway bridge in the province, crossing between Uniacke Point to the west and Kelly Point to the east. This railway bridge incorporates a swing span to permit the continued passage of marine traffic through the strait. The Government of Nova Scotia operated a small ferry service for motor vehicles across the strait for much of the 20th century. It was replaced in October 1993 with a double leaf bascule bridge, the Barra Strait Bridge, carrying Route 223.

== Bathymetry ==
The Barra Strait is over 50 metres (160 ft) deep at its southern entrance between Hectors Point to the west and Derby Point to the east. The strait continues 2.2 km (1.4 mi) to the north-east where it narrows to slightly more than 500 metres (1,600 ft) between Uniacke and Kelly Points. The bottom rises to a maximum depth of 22.8 metres (75 ft) between these points. There is 8 metres (26 ft) draught in the navigation channel through the bridge openings. The tidal stream through the Barra Strait runs the strongest at mid-flood and mid-ebb, and attain a rate of 3 knots. The tidal streams set 010°/190° through the strait, except in the vicinity of the swing bridge span where they are deflected NW and SW by Kelly Point.
