= Boisdale =

Boisdale may refer to:

- Boisdale, Victoria, Australia
- Boisdale, Nova Scotia, Canada
- Boisdale, South Uist, Scotland (See Lochboisdale)
