= St Patrick's Channel =

St Patrick's Channel may refer to:

- North Channel (Great Britain and Ireland), formerly also called St Patrick's Channel
- St. Patricks Channel an arm of Bras d'Or Lake, Cape Breton Island, Canada
