= Baddeck River =

Coordinates: 46°5′47.9″N 60°50′32″W

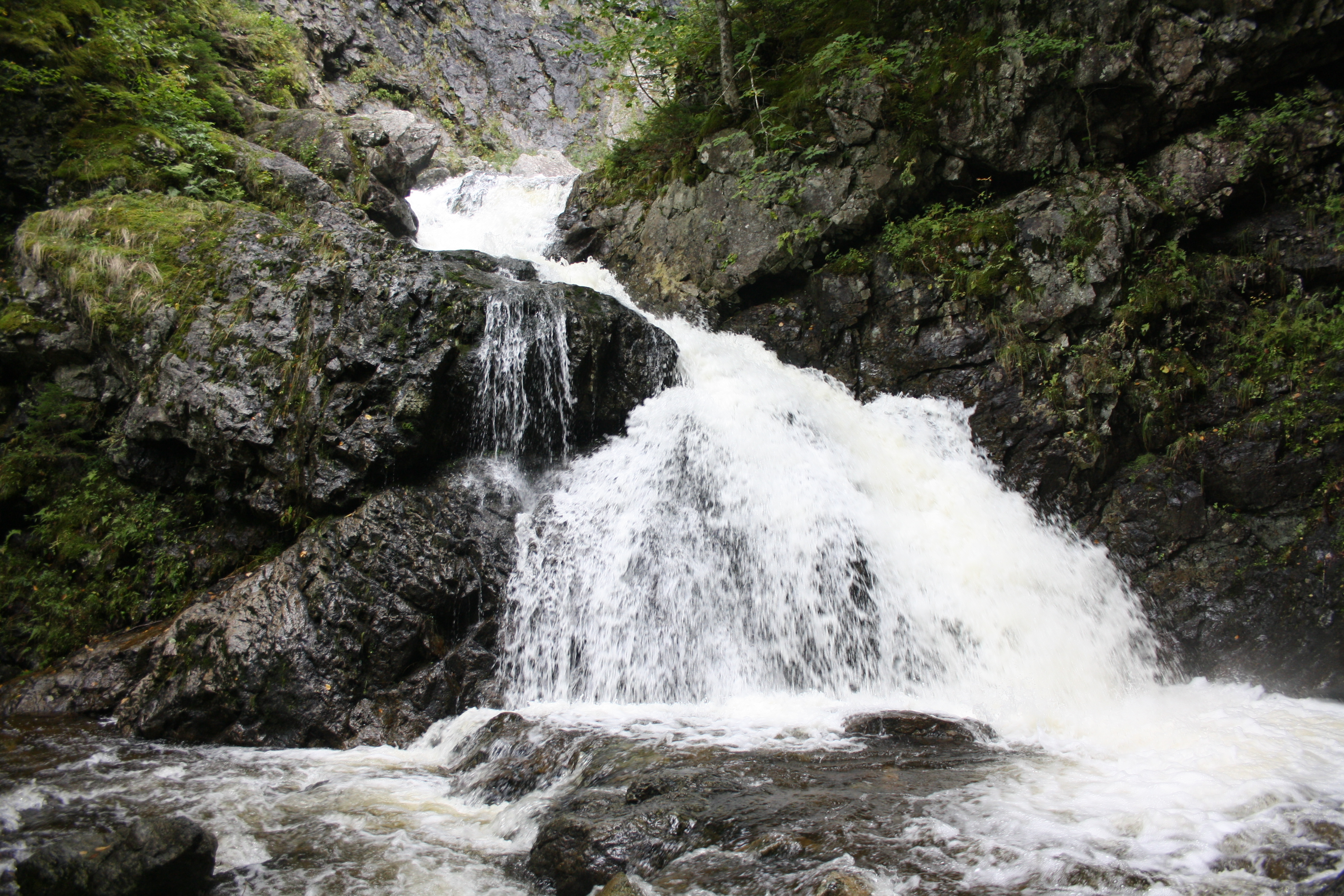
- Uisge Ban Falls, North Branch Baddeck River

Location
- Country: Canada
- Province: Nova Scotia

Physical characteristics
- Mouth
  - location: Bras d'Or Lake
  - elevation: 0 m (0 ft)
- Length: 35 km (22 mi)

The Baddeck River is a minor river on Cape Breton Island, Nova Scotia, Canada. It empties into the Bras d'Or Lake several kilometres west of the village of Baddeck.

The Baddeck River flows south from the Cape Breton Highlands. It offers excellent trout fishing and bird watching. The Uisge Ban Falls are a popular feature of the river.

== See also ==
- Baddeck, Nova Scotia
- Bras d'Or Lake
- List of rivers of Nova Scotia
