= Barra Strait Bridge =

Canadian bascule road bridge

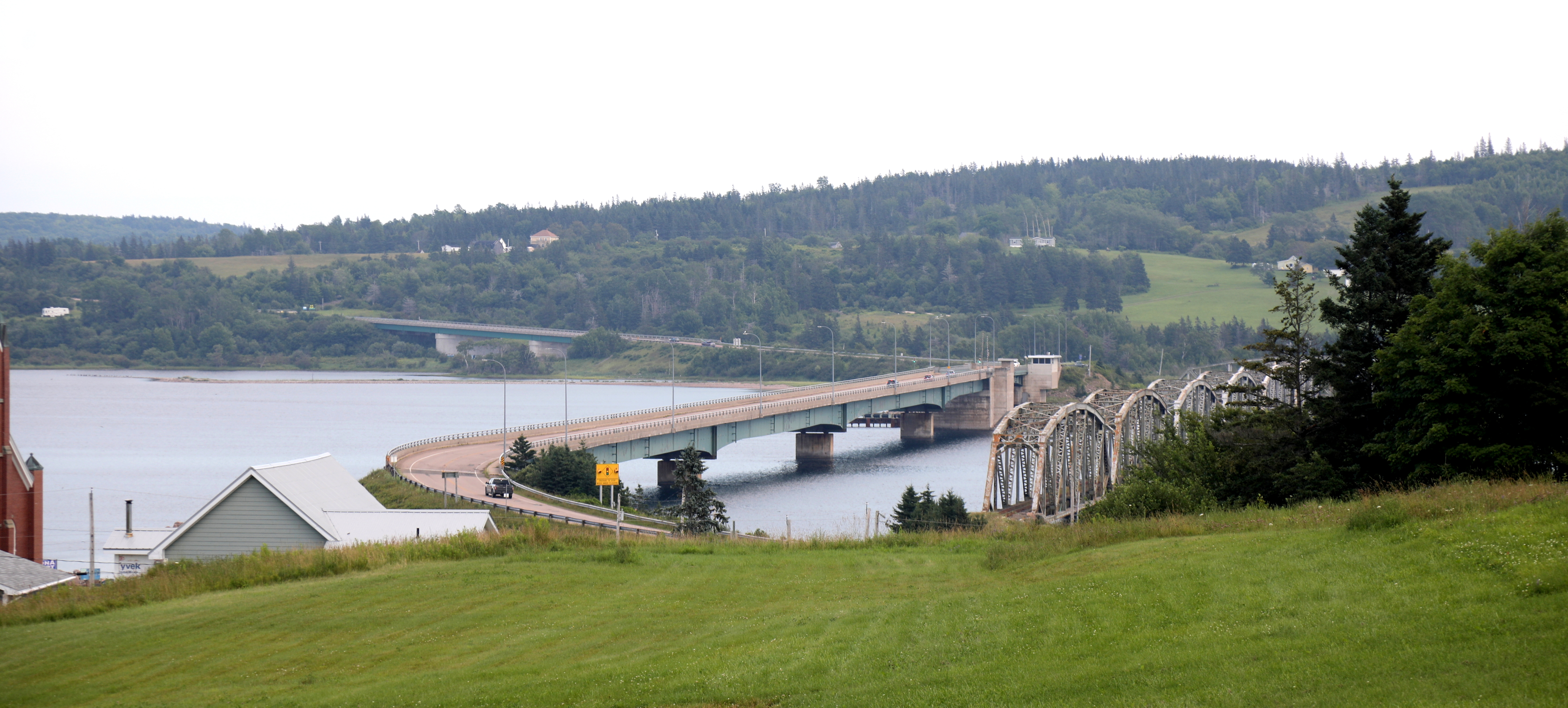
- The Barra Strait Bridge. To its right (with arched spans) is the Grand Narrows Bridge. In the distance is the overpass over the railroad tracks, part of the same Barra Strait Crossing project.
- Coordinates: 45°57′36.59″N 60°47′55.72″W
- Carries: Nova Scotia Route 223
- Crosses: Bras d'Or Lake at the Barra Strait
- Locale: Cape Breton Island (Iona, Victoria County, Nova Scotia – Grand Narrows, Cape Breton Regional Municipality)
- Official name: Barra Strait Crossing
- Other name: Barra Strait Lift Bridge
- Owner: Government of Nova Scotia
- Maintained by: Department of Transportation and Infrastructure Renewal (Nova Scotia)
- Preceded by: Grand Narrows Bridge
- Followed by: Seal Island Bridge, Little Bras d'Or Bridge

Characteristics
- Design: Girder bridge with a bascule lift span
- Material: Reinforced concrete deck
- Trough construction: Steel
- Pier construction: Reinforced concrete
- Total length: 541.25 m (1,776 ft)
- Longest span: 110 m (360 ft)
- No. of spans: 7
- Piers in water: 6
- Clearance above: Unlimited vertical clearance
- Clearance below: 9 m (30 ft) (when closed), Unlimited vertical clearance when open
- No. of lanes: 2

History
- Designer: Fenco Engineers (designed 1983–85)
- Constructed by: Phase two – VanZutphen Brothers Construction Ltd. Phase three – Maritime Steel and Foundries Ltd. of New Glasgow
- Fabrication by: Maritime Steel and Foundries Ltd.
- Construction start: 1987
- Construction end: 1993
- Construction cost: $34,800,000
- Opened: 23 October 1993
- Replaces: Barra Strait ferry service

Location
- Interactive map of Barra Strait Bridge

The Barra Strait Bridge is a Canadian road bridge crossing the Barra Strait of Bras d'Or Lake, carrying Nova Scotia Route 223 between Iona, Victoria County, on the West side, and Grand Narrows, Cape Breton County (Cape Breton Regional Municipality) on the east side. The bridge incorporates a double leaf bascule section at its eastern end to permit the continued passage of marine traffic through the strait.

== History ==
=== Ferry service ===
A ferry service operated across the Barra Strait, between Grand Narrows and Iona, starting in 1847, and continued for the next 146 years.

In the late 1880s the Intercolonial Railway of Canada bridged the strait with the Grand Narrows Bridge (also known as the Barra Strait Railway Bridge), which is still the longest railway bridge in the province, crossing between Uniacke Point to the west and Kelly Point to the east.

The Nova Scotia Department of Highways took over the Barra Strait motor vehicles ferry service in 1927 and continued the service between Grand Narrows and Iona. By the late 1980s the ferry service was carrying over 90,000 vehicles a year across the Barra Strait.

The C. Monty MacMillan was the last ferry used for the Grand Narrows–Iona crossing, in service from 1971 to 1993.

=== Permanent crossing announced ===
On 21 April 1979, in a public meeting held in Iona, the then Premier of Nova Scotia, John Buchanan announced that a permanent crossing over the Barra Strait would be built, to be completed within four years. Both a high level bridge and a causeway with an opening span were to be considered, with the high span estimated to cost $20 million, and the causeway and swing bridge option, $15 million.

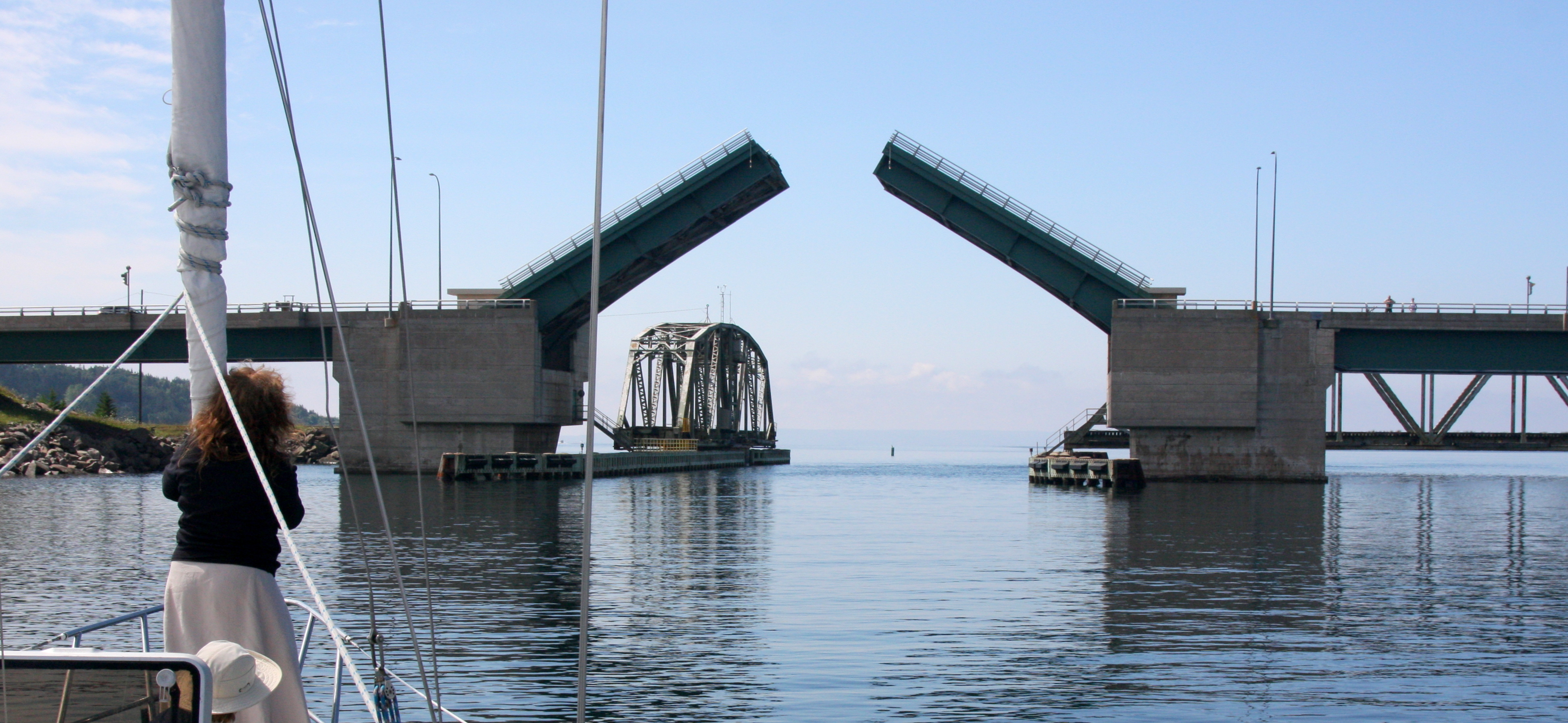
The Barra Strait Bridge opening to allow passage of a sailboat. Behind it (with the arched spans) is the Grand Narrows Bridge, with its swing span also open.

== Bridge design ==
Planning for the new Barra Strait Crossing was carried out during 1983–85 by Fenco Engineers who had the contract for the bridge design. The structure was designed by the structural engineering department at Fenco (Fenco was later bought out by Lavalin which eventually merged with Surveyer, Nenniger & Chenevert Consulting Engineers (SNC) to become SNC-Lavalin).

The Barra Strait Bridge is a girder bridge design, consisting of steel girders with a reinforced concrete deck, supported on reinforced concrete piers. The bridge incorporates a double leaf bascule section at its eastern end to permit the continued passage of marine traffic through the strait. Fenco Engineers also designed the mechanical equipment for operating the lift mechanism for the two leaves of the bridge, and for the leaf locks at the toe of the bridge leaves.

The Barra Strait Bridge was constructed just 70 m (230 ft) to the northeast of the existing Grand Narrows Bridge.

== Construction ==
The first work done for the new bridge was excavation and road work to create road approaches to the new bridge location. The approaches on the Grand Narrows side were completed by October 1983 with work on the approaches on the Iona side completed by 1985.

The bridge itself was built in phases, spread out over a number of years:

=== Phase one 1987 ===
The first phase included the bridge abutments and four of the bridge piers sunk to the bottom of the strait, over 90 feet (27 m) below.

=== Phase two 1989 ===
The second phase of construction of the bridge included the double leaf bascule, the Grand Narrows approach span, and the fendering system to guide shipping between the existing rail bridge and the new highway bridge. It was carried out through the summer of 1989 by VanZutphen Brothers Construction Ltd. Construction began on the bascule in April of that year. The first 12 feet (3.7 m) of the foundations for the bascule were built on a barge and the remaining 48 feet (15 m) were built in the water. The mechanical and electrical work for the bascule were completed that summer.

=== Phase three 1992–1993 ===
The third and final phase of the bridge construction included the installation of the girders for the five remaining spans, the bridge deck and superstructure. The waterproofing and paving of the deck, gravelling and paving of the connector roads were completed along with the proper signs.

==== Contract Lawsuit ====
There was a controversy in awarding the third phase tender which ended up at the Nova Scotia Supreme Court. Originally the tenders were limited to prestressed concrete but this was amended to include tenders on a steel alternative. To be acceptable the steel alternative had to show a substantial savings over the concrete design, inclusive of the future painting costs of a steel design. J. Anderson of the Nova Scotia Supreme Court noted in his decision:

…the steel industry lobbied the Department to permit them to bid on the final phase of the construction and eventually it was agreed that parties be permitted to tender on a steel alternative. In the tender documents were special provisions: Barra Strait Crossing, Phase III, Contract 91-001, which indicates “Bidders on this contract are hereby advised that they will be permitted to submit an alternate bid based on a structural steel type of superstructure if they so desire”. The last portion of that information to bidders states: “To be acceptable a structural steel alternative must show a substantial saving over the precast, prestressed concrete design.”

In the opinion of the engineer advising the Deputy Minister, the $151,000 savings of the structural steel bid over the best concrete bid would not result in a substantial savings as it did not include future painting costs. Against staff advice, who were opposed to a change from prestressed concrete, the contract was awarded to Maritime Steel who submitted a $7.3 million bid for a structural steel alternative. The court concluded that the contract was improperly awarded and that the Province did not realize a substantial savings.

==== Review of girder design ====
Part way through the construction of phase three a complete review of the girder design became necessary because of modifications to the original deck design which resulted in the use of additional concrete. Maritime Steel and Foundry had to have the girder design reviewed by Whitman Benn & Associates as well as two other independent consultants.

Maritime Steel also had the strengthening measures, designed by Whitman Ben, checked by another independent consultant before submitting them to the Department or Transportation for its review and approval.

The placement of concrete in the deck started in September 1992 and was completed in November 1992. During the placement of the deck the top elevation of steel box girders appeared to be too high in the area of Pier One in Span 2.

Whitmen Benn reviewed the screed elevations and provided solutions to remedy the problems, to the Transportation Department.

They recommended raising the deck by building up the concrete haunches of the box girders. The remaining deck was completed with larger haunches in the fall of 1992. The extra weight of concrete in the haunches raised concern regarding the effect on the steel structure from the additional load.

In December 1992 Whitman Benn undertook the task of reviewing the design of the superstructure with the added weight of this concrete and outlined their findings and recommendations for strengthening the structure in a report to Maritime Steel.

All the costs of the review, design and the strengthening process were born by the contractor, Maritime Steel.

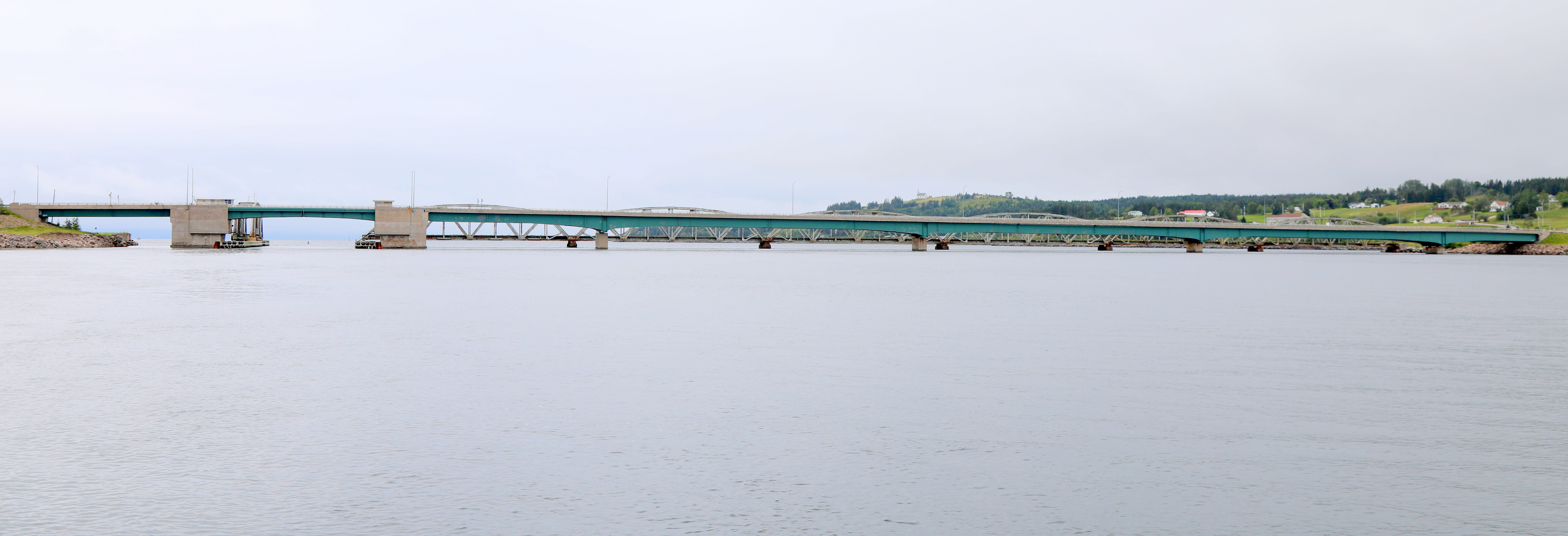
Barra Strait with the Grand Narrows and Barra Strait Bridges 04

=== Official opening ===
The Barra Strait bridge was opened in a ceremony on 23 October 1993, at 2:00 pm.

Thousands of people waited for hours in bumper to bumper traffic to share in the excitement of the opening of the Barra Strait Bridge. They have been waiting for this moment for 15 years.

The C. Monty MacMillan made its last crossing at 1:40 pm on 23 October 1993. The new Barra Strait Bridge opened 20 minutes later, at 2:00 pm, 23 October 1993.

=== Final cost ===
The final cost of the bridge was CA$34.8 million, which included the two approaches, the superstructure, an overpass over the rail lines, and paving.

== Operating cost ==
The annual operating cost of the moveable span structure at the Barra Strait is $115,000. This value accounts for the operator salaries and for typical annual maintenance.

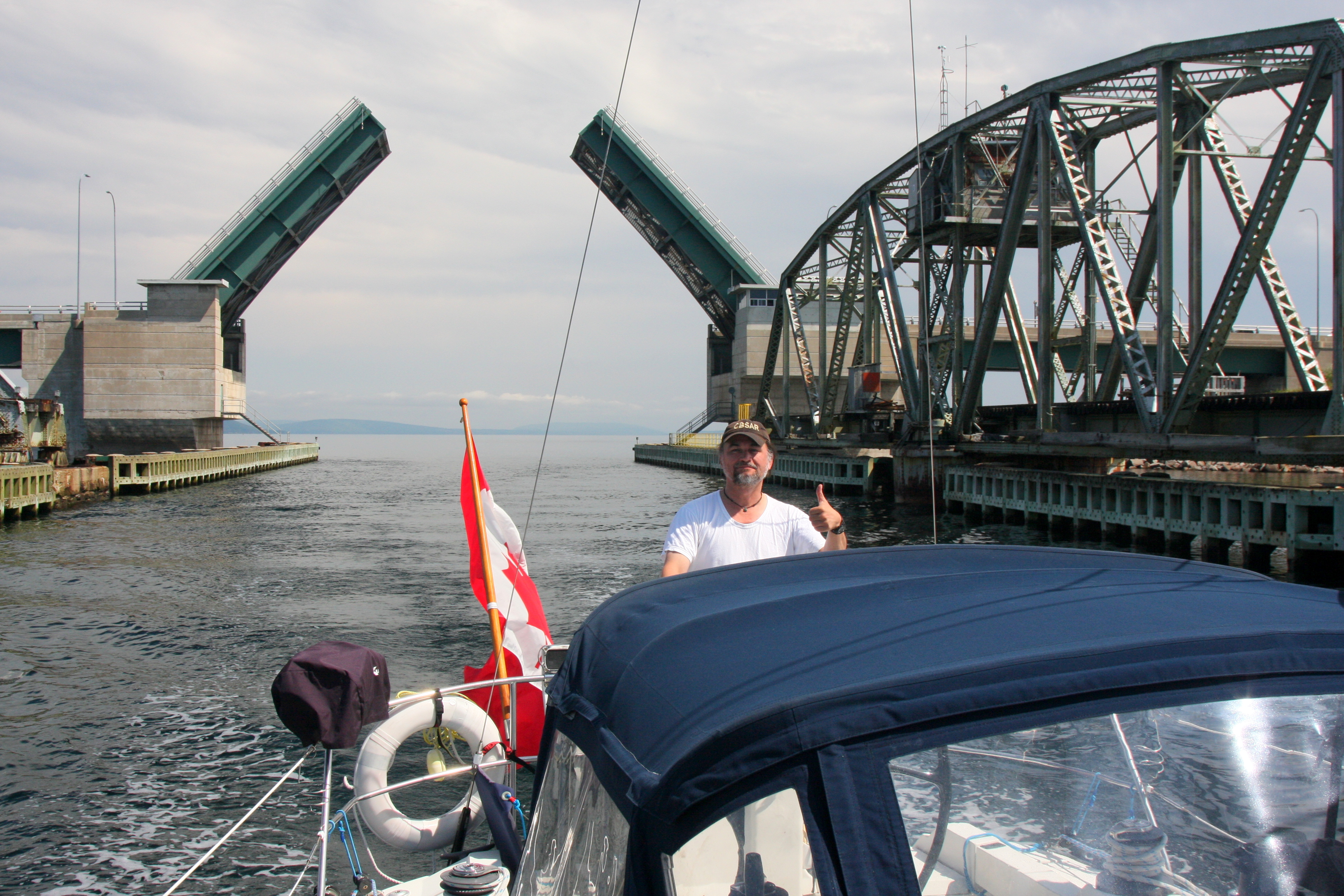
Barra Strait and Grand Narrows Bridges both open to allow marine traffic to pass.

== Marine traffic ==
Boat traffic through the Barra Strait has been logged since 1991, and has consistently ranged between 1700 and 2100 boats passing through the swing and bascule bridges each year, with a peak of 2100 passages recorded for 2002. Of these movements, an estimated 2% are commercial activity, 8% are government and 90% are recreational.

When the bascule span is opened for marine traffic the resulting channel is 31.7 m (104 ft) wide and 7.6 m (25 ft) deep. While the Barra Strait is considerably deeper at the bridges, channel depth is limited to 7.6 m (25 ft) by the presence of the wreck of the Zealandia which rests on the bottom of the strait, lying directly across the channel passage through the bridges. The Zealandia was originally built as a 3 masted, full-rigged clipper with an iron hull by C. Connell and Co. in Glasgow in 1869. She was later converted to a barge and used to carry dolomite to the Dominion Iron and Steel Company steel plant in Sydney. In July 1916 the Zealandia broke her tow during a gale and sank after crashing into the Barra Strait railway bridge. The wreck is 220 ft long by 40 ft wide and at the stern, it rises 30 ft off the bottom.

The navigation season for the Barra Strait Bridge opens on 1 May each year and runs through to the last day of October each year. From 1 May each year the bridge tender is available to open the bridge for marine traffic from 7:00 am to 11:00 pm each day. Hours are extended from the last week of June through to the Labour Day weekend, when the bridge operates 24 hours a day. During operating hours the Barra Strait Bridge can be contacted on VHF channel 16 (156.8 MHz).

== Bridge inoperable, 25 June through to 17 July 2020 ==
In late June 2020 the Nova Scotia Department of Transportation and Infrastructure Renewal announced that due to mechanical problems, the bridge was inoperable for marine traffic. The bridge remained closed to shipping for the next three weeks. As part of the repairs a drive was replaced on the west bascule leaf of the bridge. Other work that had been scheduled to be done in July was carried out at this time, which included replacing an emergency generator.

On 15 July a traffic advisory was posted indicating that the Barra Strait Bridge would undergo testing the next day (16 July) between 7 a.m. and 6 p.m. which could cause delays for motorists. The bridge was reported back in operation for shipping on 17 July 2020.

== See also ==
- List of bridges in Canada
