= Grand Narrows =

Community in Nova Scotia, Canada

Grand Narrows Miꞌkmawiꞌsimk:Taawitk Scottish Gaelic:An Caolas Mór
- Unincorporated community
- Location of Grand Narrows in Nova Scotia Grand Narrows (Canada)
- Coordinates: 45°57′23″N 60°47′36″W
- Country: Canada
- Province: Nova Scotia
- Regional municipality: Cape Breton Regional Municipality
- Time zone: UTC-4 (AST)
  - Summer (DST): UTC-3 (ADT)
- Forward sortation area: B1J
- Area codes: 902 and 782
- NTS Map: 011/F15
- GNBC Code: CAOES
- Website: http://www.grandnarrowswaterfront.com

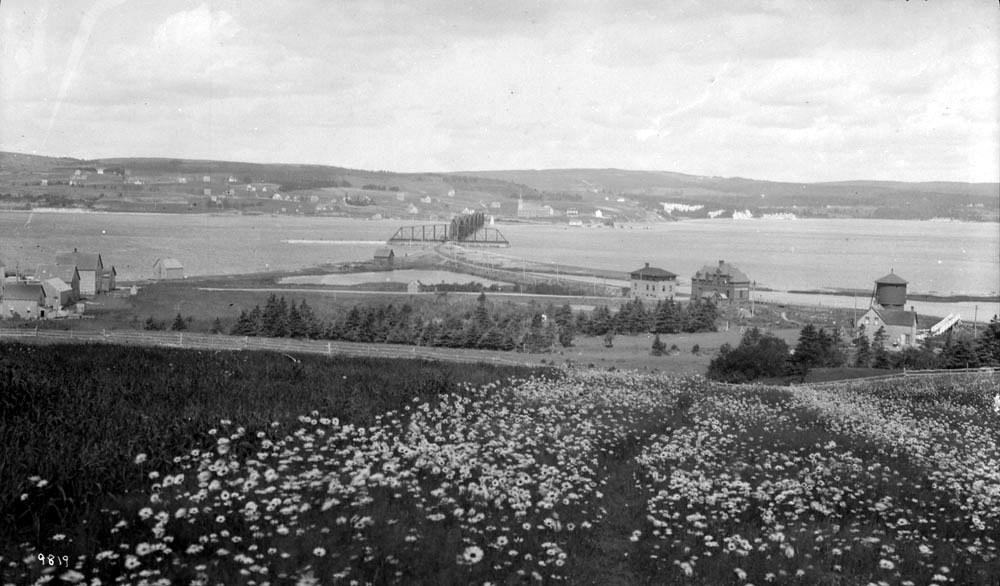
Grand Narrows, looking towards Iona. The Grand Narrows Bridge of the Intercolonial Railway at the centre of the photo, with swing span open to permit shipping to transit the Barra Strait.

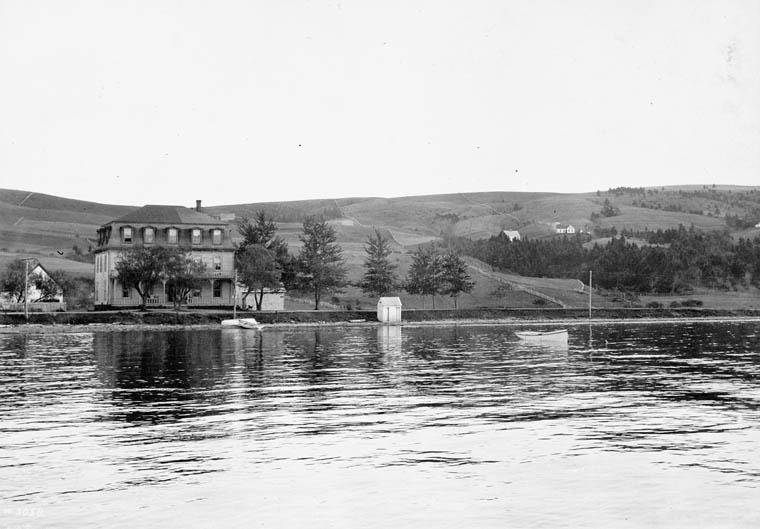
Grand Narrows. The large building is the Grand Narrows Hotel, still standing and appearing much like this and used now as a Bed & Breakfast (in 2018). The Hotel was located here as the Intercolonial Railway crossed the Grand Narrows of the Bras d'Or lake at this location so many passengers transferred between the railway and passenger steamers on the lake here.

Grand Narrows (Mi'kmawi'simk: Taawitk, Scottish Gaelic: An Caolas Mór) (2001 population 15) is an unincorporated community in the Canadian province of Nova Scotia, located in Cape Breton Regional Municipality. The community is the birthplace of the longest serving Premier of Nova Scotia, George Henry Murray. The Barra Strait Marina is here, operated by the Grand Narrows Waterfront Development Society.

== Origin of name ==
The community is named to describe the wide strait or "Grand Narrows" of Bras d'Or Lake, known as the Barra Strait, between it and Iona.

== History ==
Hector McNeil was one of the first to settle here about 1804, followed soon after by others originally from Barra in Scotland. Archibald McDougall was the teacher at the narrows by 1830, and a good school had been provided by 1839. A Postal Way Office was established in 1851.

The community came to prominence during the 1880s after the Intercolonial Railway built its line from the Strait of Canso to Sydney, crossing the Barra Strait between Iona and Grand Narrows with the Grand Narrows Bridge, still in use, which is the longest railway bridge in Nova Scotia. Grand Narrows became a major transshipment point between rail and waterborne passengers and cargo. A hotel was constructed and became a popular resting spot, Canada's first prime minister Sir John A. Macdonald was among its guests.

A passenger and vehicle ferry service was operated by the provincial government across the Barra Strait to Iona until the Barra Strait highway bridge was opened in October 1993. There is but one route of travel through Grand Narrows; a gravel road called "Derby Point" which runs along the shoreline for approximately 3 kilometers. Most of the residences in the tiny community are summer homes for families who are based in industrial Cape Breton.
