= St. Patricks Channel =

- Mi'kmawi'simk: Wetewa'q
- St. Patricks Channel in Nova Scotia St. Patricks Channel (Canada)
- Location: Cape Breton Island, Nova Scotia
- Coordinates: 46°03′50″N 60°51′02″W
- Type: Channel
- Part of: Bras d'Or Lake
- Ocean/sea sources: Gulf of Saint Lawrence, Atlantic Ocean
- Basin countries: Canada
- Max. length: 11.8 nautical miles (21.9 km; 13.6 mi)
- Max. width: 2 nautical miles (3.7 km; 2.3 mi)
- References: Geographical Names of Canada - East Bay

St. Patricks Channel (Mi'kmawi'simk: Wetewa'q) is an arm of the Bras d'Or Lake located on Cape Breton Island, in the Canadian province of Nova Scotia. St. Patricks Channel lies entirely within Victoria County.

== Description ==
St. Patricks Channel runs roughly in a northeast to southwest direction from the village of Baddeck to Little Narrows where it joins Whycocomagh Bay. The channel's shores are generally heavily wooded and consist mainly of bold & rocky shorelines interspersed with distinctive white gypsum outcrops and barrachois (barrier) points and beaches. As the channel is part of the Bras d'Or Lake system and the lake is essentially a fiordal system connected to the North Atlantic via two restricted channels at the Great Bras d'Or Channel north of Boularderie Island and the Little Bras d'Or Channel to south of Boularderie Island, the waters of St. Patricks Channel are brackish, partially fresh/ salt water.

== Geology ==
The Bras d'Or Lakes were occupied by glaciers during the last ice age. When the ice had gone they were freshwater lakes until ca. 6,350 calendar years ago, when rising sea level connected them with the ocean. The rate of sea-level rise at the start of inundation was 79 cm/century, and has declined throughout the past 6000 years. Due to this relatively high rate of inundation by the ocean the lakes contain some of the best-preserved drowned shorelines in Atlantic Canada. These ancient shores lie 25 metres below modern sea level. Submerged river networks occur in St. Patricks Channel and the nearby Denys Basin.

== History ==
By 1829 the shores and rivers of St. Patricks Channel were all settled, chiefly by Scottish emigrants, but not much of the back country was occupied. Timber ships from Great Britain visited the channel, loading wood for export.

== Boating ==
The Cruising Club of America recommends the Washabuck River as one of their favored anchorages for cruising pleasure craft.

== Industry ==
CGC Little Narrows. Operated by Little Narrows Gypsum, a division of United States Gypsum, this surface mine near the settlement of Little Narrows exports raw gypsum and anhydrite and has been producing gypsum since 1935, under two different owners. United States Gypsum (USG) has owned the company since 1954. Today, the mine and plant cover an area of approximately 809 ha. From docking facilities on St. Patricks Channel adjacent to the quarry, Little Narrows Gypsum ships approximately one million tonnes of quarried gypsum yearly by vessel to several destinations in the United States, including Baltimore, Maryland and Florida. As the loading facility is closed from January to March, this amounts to roughly 30 vessels per year from April to December. Little Narrows Gypsum Company's anhydrite quarry produced 71,441 tonnes in 2004. Gypsum production for the same year was 1,105,480 tonnes. The company employs 51 people.

== The name ==
The present day name for the channel, "St. Patricks Channel" (or slight spelling variations), appears in written accounts as early as 1829, and on maps of the area at least as far back as 1855. The present official spelling, "St. Patricks Channel" (without the apostrophe), was officially adopted on August 14, 1962.

The original Mi'kmawi'simk name, Wetewa'q, means "noise heard from afar."
