= Ironville, Nova Scotia =

Community in Nova Scotia, Canada

Coordinates: 46°8′15.86″N 60°27′16.83″W

Ironville in Nova Scotia

Ironville is a community in the Canadian province of Nova Scotia, located in the Cape Breton Regional Municipality on Cape Breton Island. Formerly known as Boisdale Barrachois, the community was renamed when a separate post office was set up within the area in 1878, just east of Boisdale, and a new name to distinguish it from Boisdale and Barrachois was needed. Since iron was discovered here in 1886, the name Ironville was chosen, on August 1, 1907.
