= Leitches Creek Station =

Locality in Nova Scotia, Canada

Coordinates: 46°10′11.23″N 60°18′43.59″W

Leitches Creek Station in Nova Scotia

Leitches Creek Station is a locality in the Canadian province of Nova Scotia, located in the Cape Breton Regional Municipality on Cape Breton Island.
