= Georges River, Nova Scotia =

Community in Nova Scotia, Canada

Coordinates: 46°12′2.47″N 60°20′25.25″W

Georges River in Nova Scotia

Georges River is a community in the Canadian province of Nova Scotia, located in the Cape Breton Regional Municipality on Cape Breton Island.
