= Boisdale, Nova Scotia =

Coordinates: 46°5′56.85″N 60°30′13.57″W

Boisdale Gàidhlig: Bhaghasdail
- Community
- Interactive map of Boisdale
- Country: Canada
- Region: Cape Breton Regional Municipality

Boisdale in Nova Scotia

Boisdale (English: /ˈbɔɪzdeɪl/ Scottish Gaelic: Baghasdail) is a community in the Canadian province of Nova Scotia, located in the Cape Breton Regional Municipality on Cape Breton Island. It was named for Lochboisdale, the main village of the island of South Uist in the Outer Hebrides of Scotland.

== History ==
Neil Campbell was granted land in the area in 1836. In 1821, Thomas Lockman, an Irishman who came to Cape Breton in 1799 and lived at Lloyds Cove, petitioned for land, and got a grant next to Neil Campbell's lot in 1842.

Angus McIntyre got a grant in 1846, and in 1869, land at what was then called Boisdale was granted to Dugald O'Henley. Farming and lumbering were the basic industries. In 1840, a small log church was constructed by Father John Grant on where the present-day church resides. It was replaced by a new building in 1862, which burned down in September 1928. In 1846, Boisdale Parish was officially erected.

A post office was established at Boisdale Chapel in 1854. On October 1, 1873 a new post office was established with Michael McIntyre as office keeper. In 1874, the total population of Boisdale, was that of 500. During this time, the area had 1 store, 3 sawmills, 1 grist mill, and a post office, of which mail was delivered bi-weekly. By 1908, it contained 1 hotel, 2 general stores, 1 saw mill, and 2 gristmills. The population at that time, was 300. In 1915, a newer 40,000 gallon open-wood tank was built replacing an older 40,000 gallon wood tank, for the water services within the area.

Father Alexander F. MacGillivray, whom was the fifth pastor of Boisdale, had installed the bell within St. Andrew's Church in Boisdale, in 1882, and had built the Glebe house there in 1890. A new and larger bell, cast by the Meneely Bell Company of New York, was installed in St. Andrew's Church, by Father MacGillivray, on Nov. 14, 1897.

In 1921, Father Gillis built St. Andrew's Parish Hall, James Johnston of Red Islands, Nova Scotia was the contractor. The formal opening of the hall was held on September 13, 1921. The original St. Andrew's Parish Church was destroyed by fire on Sunday, September 11, 1927. Construction of a new stone church commenced in June 1929, with help from workers from Quebec.

The design style of the church was inspired by the Norman architecture as well as the St Mary the Virgin, Iffley church in England. Link, Weber, and Bowers, architects hailing from Pittsburgh, Pennsylvania, designed the architecture of the church. The approximate cost of the church was $55,000, but the exterior walls had to be repointed during the summer of 1930, which added an extra $7,500 to the total cost. The new church was blessed on Sunday, August 31, 1930, by Bishop James Morrison, assisted by the late Bishop Alexander MacDonald. In 1931, the total population of Boisdale was 449. There was also a train station located on Station Road, in Boisdale during this time. The former Glebe House for St. Andrew's Church was burnt down in 2011, due to a fire.

Dugald Smith was the teacher in 1839, and a school-house had been constructed by that time. A new school-house was completed in 1917. Education within the area dates back to the early 1800s, with the Boisdale Consolidated School closing in 2003. The enrolment for the school, in the 1957–1958 academic year, were 82 students, and 3 teachers. By the 1987 academic year, there were only 21 students, all within grades primary-second, and fourth.

=== Youth summer camp ===
In 1943, within what is now known as Ironville, then known as Boisdale Barrachois until 1907, a youth summer camp was built. The two-week summer camp operated from 1943, until its closure in the 1980s. Efforts were made in 1997 to re-open the camp in the spring of 1998. The camp officially closed in 2010, due to the deterioration of some of the buildings. The property in which the youth camp was on, was sold in 2013. In August 1977, the community of Boisdale, as well as Father Webb, unveiled and held a ceremony for the opening of an indoor stone, ice-skating rink. Father Webb also built a Co-op store (also made of stone), in the 70s. A new hall above the store replaced the old Holyrood Hall, which burned down on December 18, 1975. By 1956, the population of Boisdale was 133. Over the years the population decreased, down to 138 by 1991, and estimated to be 105 by the 2001 Census.

=== Genealogical history book ===
To the Hill of Boisdale, a book on the genealogical history of Boisdale was published in 1986, and later in a revised edition in 2001, by Father Allan MacMillan, then Priest of the Diocese of Antigonish. Highland Gold Maple, a family-owned and operated sugar maple producer, has been operating within the area for over fifteen years. In late April 2018, their operation burned to the ground due to a fire. By March 2019, Highland Gold Maple had rebuilt the Sugar Shack and are back in operation.
