= Bras d'Or Lake =

Lake in Nova Scotia, Canada

Bras d'Or Lake Pitupaq
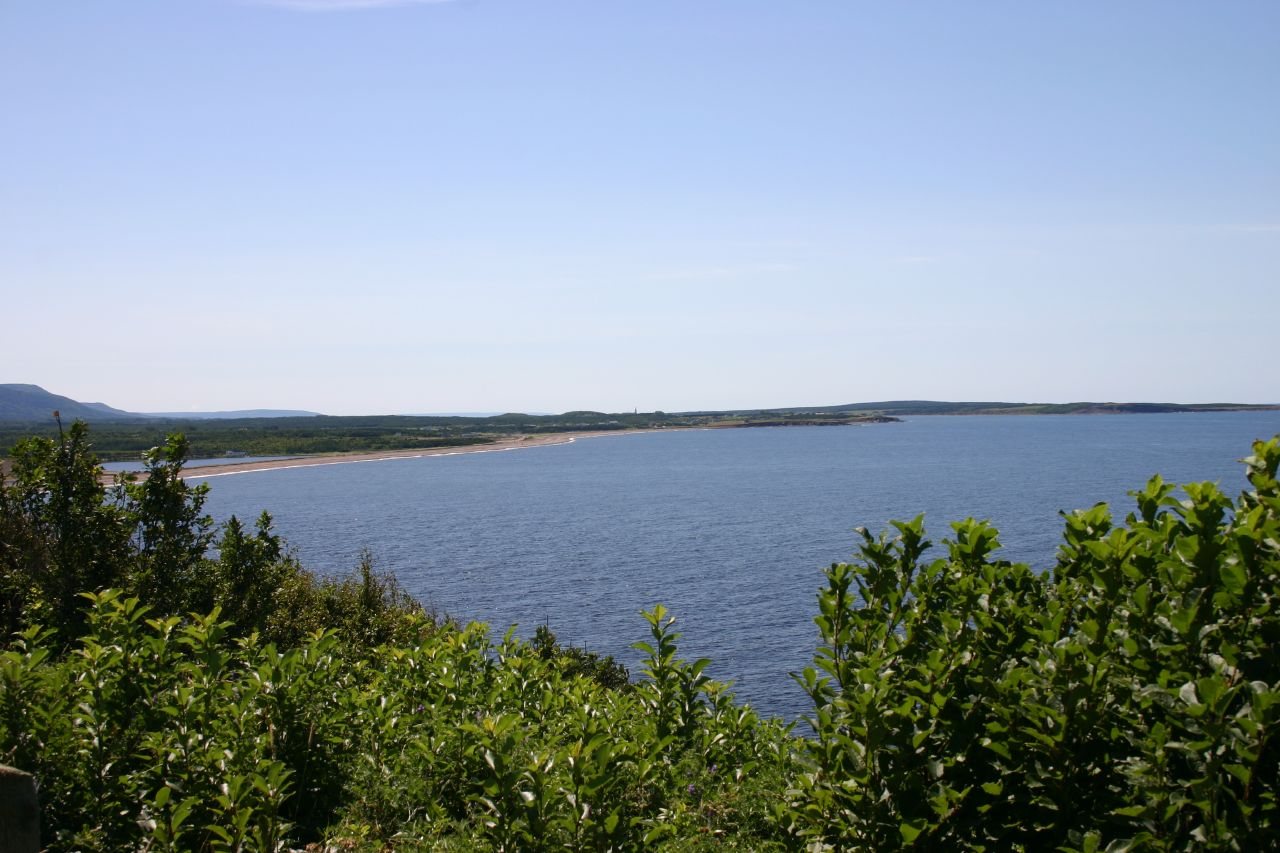

- Location within Nova Scotia
- Location: Cape Breton Island, Nova Scotia
- Coordinates: 45°51′37″N 60°46′44″W
- Type: estuary
- Primary outflows: Gulf of St. Lawrence; Atlantic Ocean
- Basin countries: Canada
- Max. length: 100 km (62 mi)
- Max. width: 50 km (31 mi)
- Surface area: 1,099 km^{2} (424 sq mi)
- Max. depth: 287 m (942 ft)
- Water volume: 32,000,000,000 m^{3} (4.2×10^{10} cu yd)
- Shore length^{1}: 1,000 km (621 mi) (excluding islands)
- Surface elevation: 0 m (0 ft) (sea level)
- ^{1} Shore length is not a well-defined measure.

Bras d'Or Lake (Mi'kmawi'simk: Pitupaq) is an irregular estuary in the centre of Cape Breton Island in Nova Scotia, Canada. It has a connection to the open sea, and is tidal. It also has inflows of fresh water from rivers, making the brackish water a very productive natural habitat. It was designated the Bras d'Or Lake Biosphere Reserve (now Bras d'Or Lake Biosphere Region) by UNESCO in 2011.

== Toponym ==
Pronounced (/brəˈdɔːr/ brə-DOR or /bræˈdɔːr/ brad-OR), maps before 1872 name it Le Lac de Labrador (or more simply Labrador). Labrador was the name given by the Portuguese to much of eastern Canada; the lake's name eventually evolved to resemble the French language Arm of Gold, a homonym. It is also called locally The Bras d'Or Lakes.

In Mi'kmawi'simk, the lake's name, Pitupaq, refers to the brackish waters, meaning "the long salt water."

== Geography ==
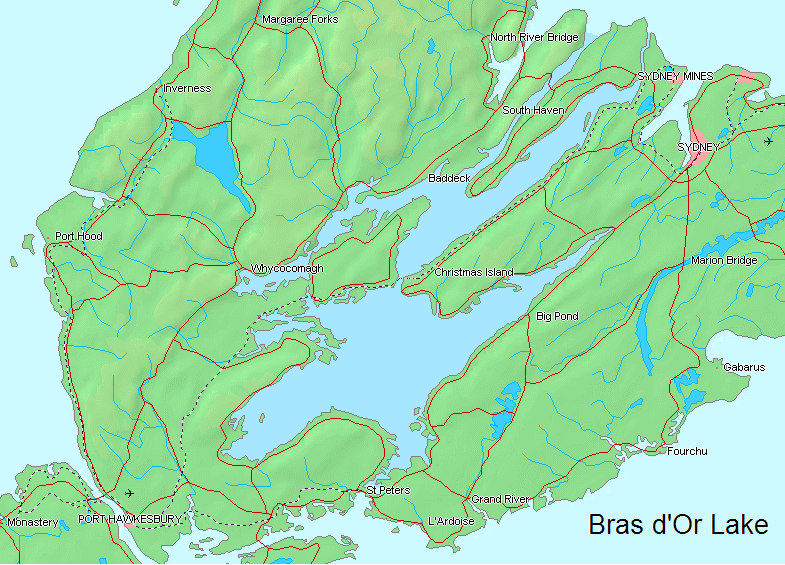
Bras d'Or Lake

The lake has a surface area of 1099 square kilometers. Three arms stretch out to the north east. At the top, the Great Bras d'Or Channel connects to the ocean via a navigable channel. The maximum depth is 287 m (942 ft) in St. Andrews Channel. It sits in a 3,500 square kilometre drainage basin.

The western side is generally shallow, and is part of an extensive drumlin field. Steep hills rise abruptly on the northwestern side, to the Cape Breton Highlands.

The Denys, Middle, Baddeck, and Georges Rivers all empty into the lake. The lake water has lower salinity than the surrounding ocean, and varies from about 20 parts per thousand near river mouths to 29 parts per thousand in deeper areas.

Ice cover has been declining in recent years.

The lake is connected to the North Atlantic by two natural channels; the Great and Little Bras d'Or Channels which pass on either side of Boularderie Island. The southern tip of the lake is connected to the Atlantic Ocean via the St. Peters Canal, built for shipping traffic in the 1860s.

The restricted channels to the ocean cause a reduction in tidal range.

Seaweed populations resemble those found in the Gulf of St. Lawrence. The warm waters are suitable for eastern oyster. Fish species include the blackspotted stickleback, white hake, blueback herring, Greenland cod, and introduced rainbow trout. These feed double-crested cormorants, bald eagles, and great blue herons.

== Human history ==
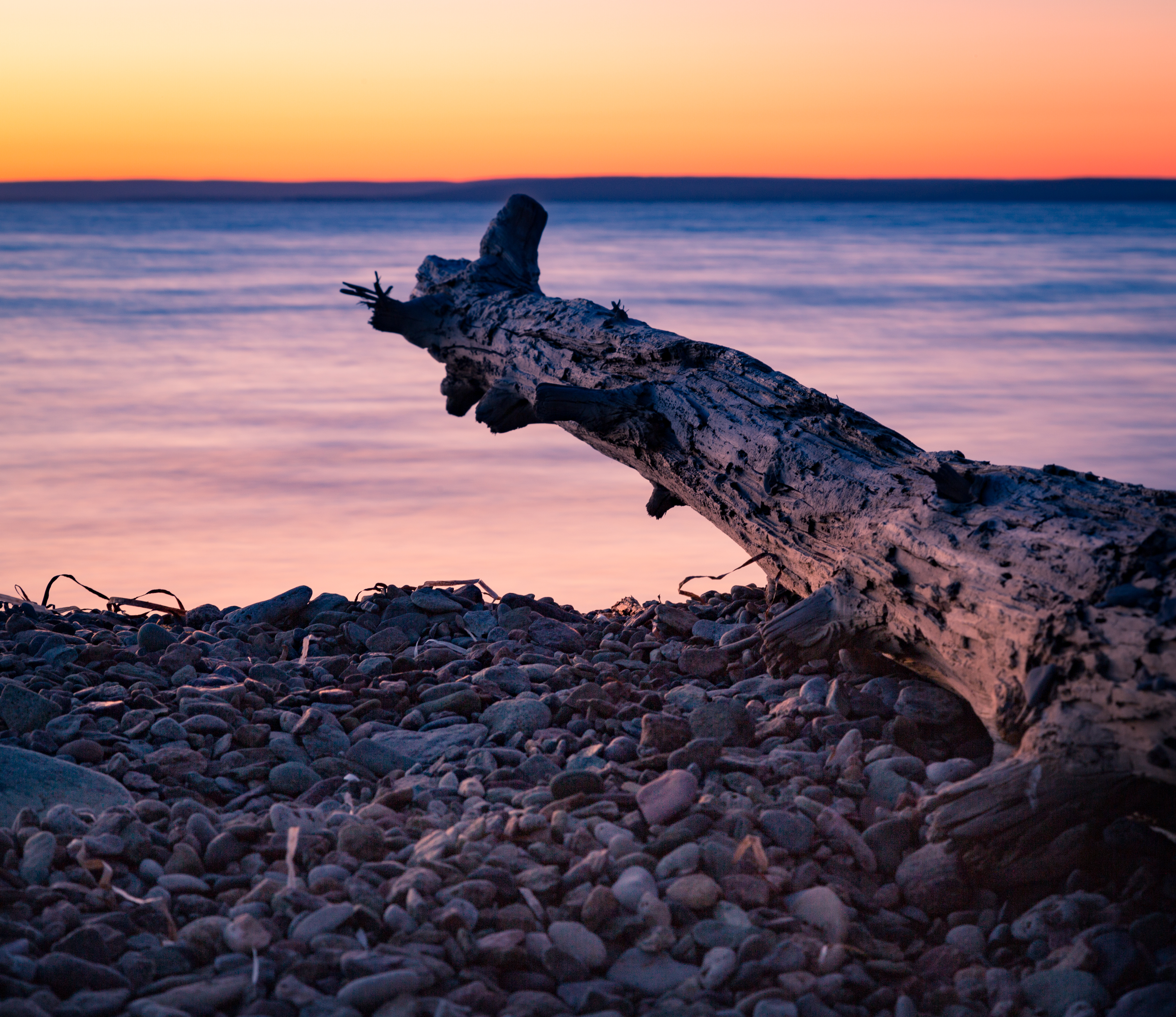
Sunset over Bras d'Or Lake in Irish Cove, Nova Scotia, in September 2015

In southwestern Nova Scotia, there is archaeological evidence that traces traditional land use and resources to at least 4,000 years. Mi'kmaq peoples occupied lands around Bras d'Or Lake when European explorers first arrived. Named Unama'ki in their language, it is the fire (or capital district) of their country, Mi'kma'ki, part of the greater Wabanaki Confederacy of the Dawnland region. The Mi'kmaq call the lake Pitupaq, meaning long salt water. A French trading post was built in 1650. Alexander Graham Bell built an estate Beinn Bhreagh where he established a research laboratory, and used the lake to test man-carrying kites, airplanes and hydrofoil boats.

Most of the shore is undeveloped, but settlements include Baddeck, Eskasoni, Little Bras d'Or, St. Peter's, and Whycocomagh. Shoreline is under the jurisdiction of the Cape Breton Regional Municipality and the county municipalities of Inverness, Victoria, and Richmond.

Sailboat racing is a long tradition in the Bras d'Or, with events hosted by the Bras d'Or Yacht Club

Today most economic activity around the lake is related to the services in the tertiary sector of the economy.

== See also ==
- Bras d'Or Lakes Scenic Drive
- Potlotek First Nation
- Barra Strait: a narrows in the middle of the lake, transversed by the Barra Strait Bridge and the Grand Narrows Bridge.
- St. Patricks Channel: an arm of the lake

== Gallery ==
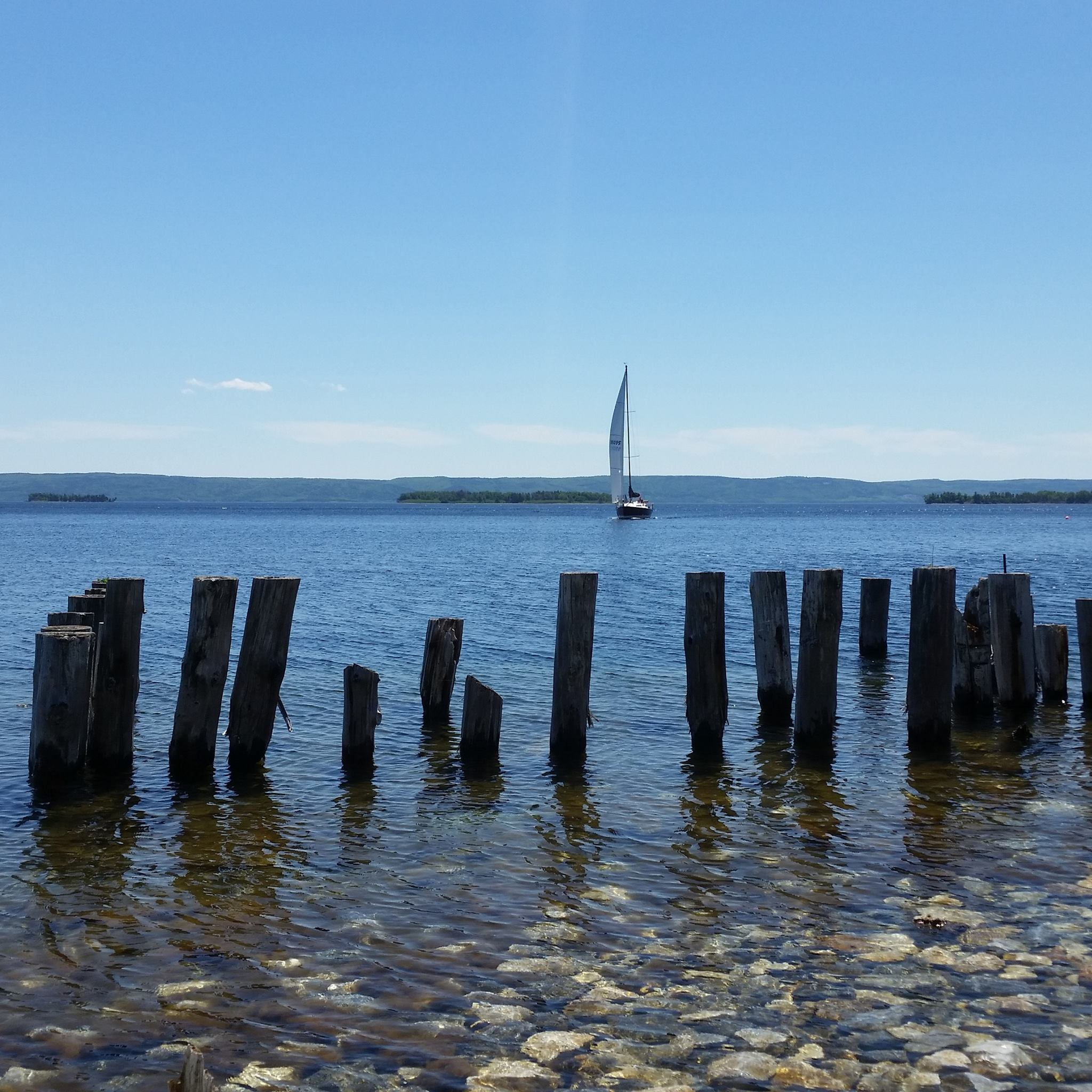
Marble Mountain in early summer

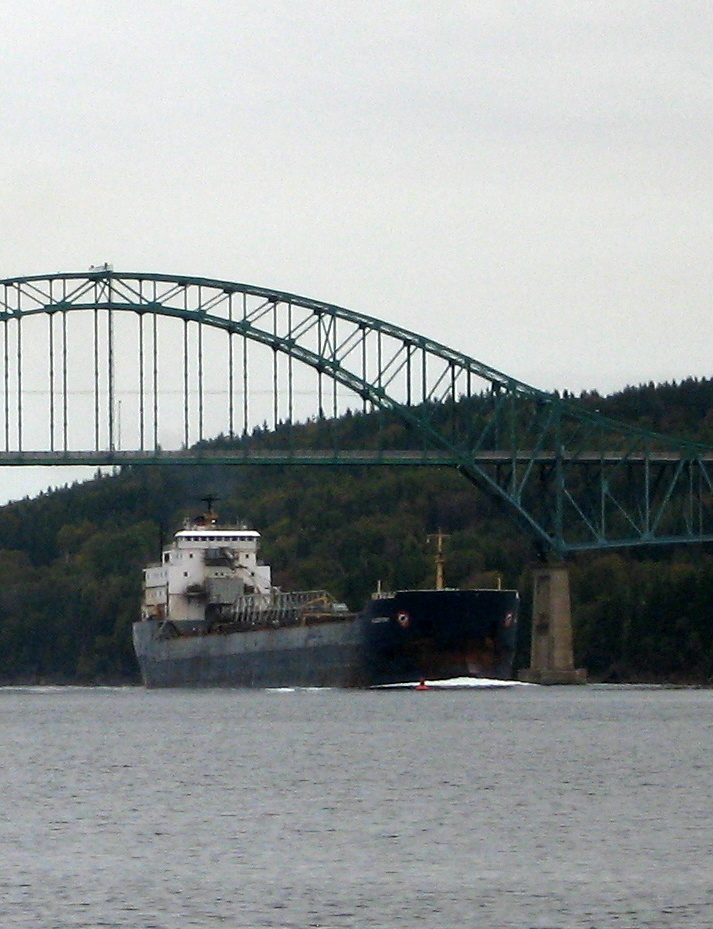
Ocean-going ships enter and exit the Bras d'Or Lake system via Great Bras d'Or, spanned by the Seal Island Bridge

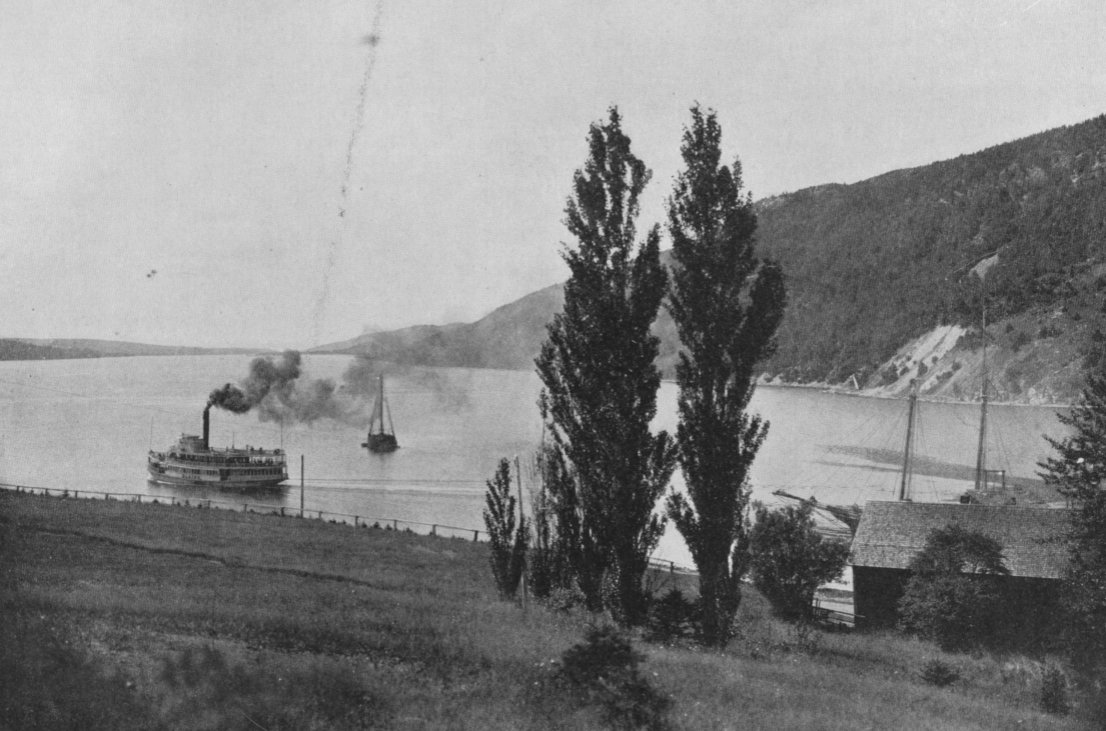
Passenger steamer on Bras d'Or Lake near New Campbellton, ca 1903.

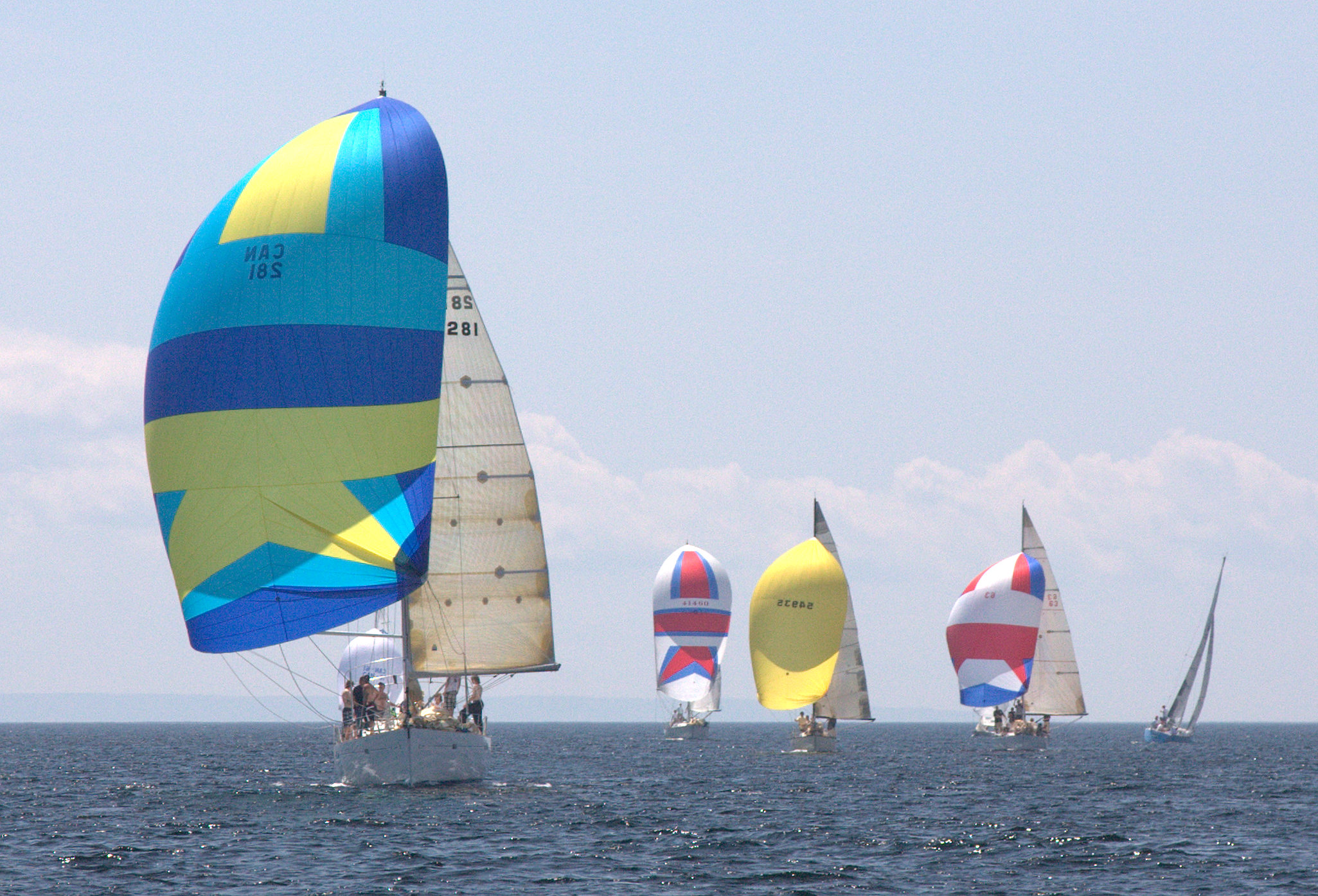
The East Bay Regatta, held the last weekend in July since 1984, features races and other social events. As many as 40 boats participate.
