= Iona, Nova Scotia =

Community in Nova Scotia, Canada

Iona
- Unincorporated community
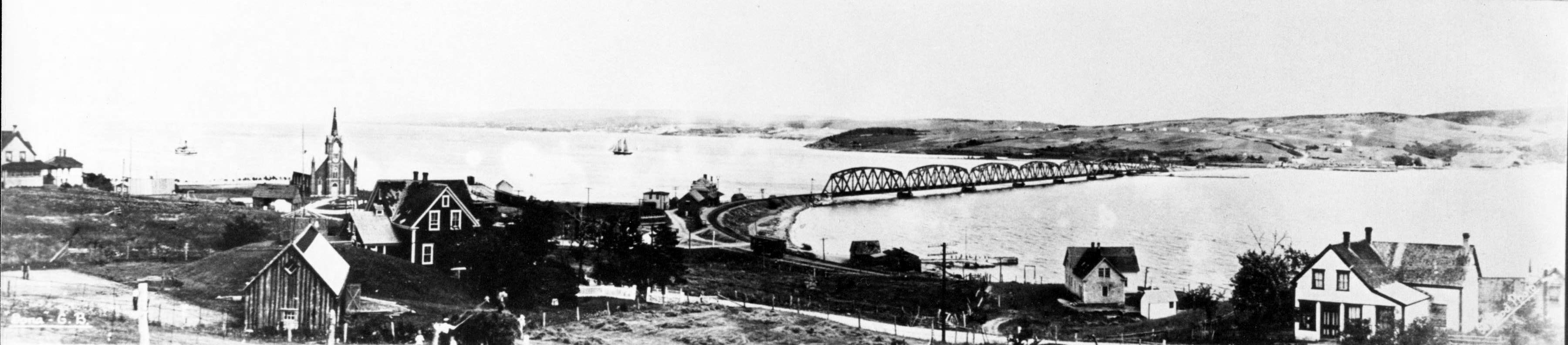
- A view of Iona in the early 1900s. St.Columba Church to the left, the Grand Narrows Bridge over the Barra Strait in the background.

- Location of Iona in Nova Scotia Iona (Canada)
- Coordinates: 45°57′45″N 60°48′17″W
- Country: Canada
- Province: Nova Scotia
- County municipality: Victoria County
- Time zone: UTC-4 (AST)
  - Summer (DST): UTC-3 (ADT)
- Forward sortation area: B2C
- Area codes: 902 and 782
- NTS Map: 011/F15
- GNBC Code: CARNE

Iona (Scottish Gaelic: Sanndraigh) is an unincorporated community in the Canadian province of Nova Scotia, located in the Municipality of the County of Victoria on Cape Breton Island. It is named after Iona in Scotland. It is at the western end of the Barra Strait Bridge, opposite Grand Narrows.

Iona was settled by Gaelic speaking immigrants from the Isle of Barra in 1802. Established St. Columba Roman Catholic Parish in 1873, decicated in enduring honour of Saint Columba and his ancient abbey on the Isle of Iona. It is the site of Highland Village Museum (An Clachan Gàidhealach) and the Rankin School of the Narrows.
