= Little Narrows =

Community in Nova Scotia, Canada

Coordinates: 45°59′32″N 60°59′1″W

Little Narrows in Nova Scotia

Little Narrows is a small community in the Canadian province of Nova Scotia, located in Victoria County on Cape Breton Island. The Mi'kmaq name for this area was "Aksegaguntcetc."
